= Timeline of the COVID-19 pandemic in the United States (2020) =

The following is a timeline of the COVID-19 pandemic in the United States during 2020.

== Background ==
By late November 2019, coronavirus disease 2019 had broken out in Wuhan, China.

As reported in Clinical Infectious Diseases on November 30, 2020, 7,389 blood samples collected between December 13, 2019, and January 17, 2020, by the American Red Cross from normal donors in nine states (California, Connecticut, Iowa, Massachusetts, Michigan, Oregon, Rhode Island, Washington and Wisconsin) included 84 (1.1 percent) that were positive for SARS-CoV-2 antibodies. According to the article, "These findings suggest that SARS-CoV-2 may have been introduced into the United States prior to January 19, 2020."

On December 31, 2019, the U.S. Centers for Disease Control and Prevention (CDC) became aware of cases in China and began developing reports for the Department of Health and Human Services (HHS) on January 1.

== Timeline ==
Cases

Deaths

=== January 1–20, 2020 ===
On January 3, CDC director Robert Redfield was notified by a counterpart in China that a "mysterious respiratory illness was spreading in Wuhan [China]"; he notified HHS Secretary Alex Azar, who shared the report with the National Security Council (NSC). According to The Washington Post, warnings about the virus were included in the President's Daily Brief in early January, an indicator of the emphasis placed on the virus by the intelligence community.

On January 3, Redfield emailed and spoke to George Gao, director of the Chinese CDC, and the following day, January 4, emailed an offer of technical assistance.

On January 5, the World Health Organization (WHO) reported a "pneumonia of unknown cause" in Wuhan. The WHO advised against travel or trade restrictions at the time.

On January 6, the CDC issued a travel notice for the city of Wuhan in Hubei province, China, and CDC Director Redfield offered in a letter to Chinese officials to send a team of CDC scientists to assist China. China did not accept the offer for several weeks, which delayed the U.S. access to the virus, important for developing diagnostic tests and a vaccine. China did release genetic data on the new coronavirus on January 9.

During the week of January 6, officials of the Department of Health and Human Services (HHS) convened an intra-agency task force including Redfield (CDC), Azar (HHS), and Anthony S. Fauci, Director of the National Institute of Allergy and Infectious Diseases.

On January 7, the CDC established a coronavirus incident management system to better share and respond to information about the virus.

On January 8, the CDC issued its first public alert about the coronavirus.

On January 9, the WHO issued a statement naming the disease as a new coronavirus in Wuhan.

On January 10, the WHO issued a comprehensive package of guidance to countries on how to test for potential cases. By this date, the WHO warned of the risk of human-to-human transmission.

On January 11, the CDC updated the January 6 Level 1 travel health notice for Wuhan, China.

On January 14, the WHO held a press briefing stating that the father had died; their information suggested a possibility of limited, but not sustained, human-to-human transmission. The WHO recommended countries to take precautions due to the human-to-human transmission during earlier SARS and MERS outbreaks. The WHO also tweeted that "preliminary investigations conducted by the Chinese authorities have found no clear evidence of human-to-human transmission of the novel #coronavirus (2019-nCoV)". The head of China's National Health Commission, Ma Xiaowei, confidentially provided a "grim" situation assessment to key Chinese health officials. The related memo said "human-to-human transmission is possible." An investigation by AP News indicated that the reporting of a case in Thailand prompted the meeting, as well as the risk of spread with heightened travel during the Chinese New Year and various political considerations. However, the Chinese public is not warned until January 20.

Beginning January 17, the CDC dispatched public health experts to screen incoming airport passengers at John F. Kennedy International Airport in New York City, San Francisco, and Los Angeles, adding monitors at Chicago and Atlanta in late January.

On January 18, HHS Secretary Azar discussed the coronavirus outbreak with President Donald Trump, who, Azar said, criticized him as alarmist.

An animated map showing the first confirmed case (orange) and death (dark red) on the date that it was first announced

=== January 20–28 ===
On January 20, Chinese authorities announced the confirmation that human-to-human transmission of the coronavirus had already occurred.

The first recorded U.S. case of the new virus was also reported on January 20, in a 35-year-old American citizen traveling from Wuhan, China, to his home in Washington state.

By January 20, the CDC developed its own coronavirus test as per protocol and used it to evaluate the first U.S. case. The CDC test was soon found to be defective, with the third probe giving inconclusive results. The CDC directed state health department labs to send all samples to the CDC lab in Atlanta for evaluation, significantly increasing testing turn-around times.

On January 20, Chinese Communist Party general secretary Xi Jinping and State Council premier Li Keqiang issued the first public warning about the coronavirus to Chinese citizens.

On January 20, Fauci announces the National Institutes of Health was already working on the development of a vaccine for the coronavirus.

On January 20, state and local health departments in the United States, in collaboration with teams deployed from the CDC, began identifying and monitoring all persons considered to have had close contact with confirmed COVID-19 patients.

On January 21 the CDC activated its emergency operations center to enhance support for the coronavirus response.

A man who had returned from Wuhan was hospitalized for the virus in Washington state on January 21, 2020. He was released after two weeks of treatment. A few days later, another case was reported in Chicago, by a woman who had also just returned from Wuhan. A third case was confirmed a day later in Orange County, California.

On a January 21 press telebriefing, CDC and Washington State health officials announced the first U.S. case, describing how he had returned to Seattle via an indirect flight from Wuhan two days before the January 17 start of enhanced airport entry screening. After arrival, responding to ongoing passenger education, he recognized he should seek care and was appropriately evaluated locally with overnight confirmation by CDC with the just finalized test (utilizing the genetic data released days earlier from China), with resulting isolation and contact tracing. The press was also advised that the enhanced screening then underway—initially at the 3 locations determined to be receiving the vast majority of direct and connecting flights from Wuhan—had so far processed over 1,200 passengers with negative findings, but that in conjunction with HSA and DOT the CDC was about to operationalize full coverage by a complex funneling of Wuhan passengers from all over the globe into designated airports by reissuing tickets and rerouting through connecting and direct flights. The CDC posture was stated as “being proactive at all levels,” and that they “continue to believe the risk of this novel coronavirus to the American public at large remains low at this time.”

On January 22, Trump received his first public question from a reporter regarding whether he was concerned about the coronavirus. Trump responded: "No, not at all. And we have it totally under control. It's one person coming in from China ... It's going to be just fine." Besides this response during a business-press interview while at Davos, the President told other reporters “we do have a plan and we think it is going to be handled very well. We’ve already handled it very well. The CDC is terrific. Very professional.” The NIH’s Dr. Fauci, interviewed a few days later on an AMA podcast about this case and the immediately subsequent handful of other travel-related cases, advised that “we handled it properly,” and that fortunately so far there were no secondary cases, but cautioned that the next few weeks would be critical as to whether it would become a sustained global outbreak or just "disappear the way SARS did.”

On the same day of the President’s remarks while at Davos, the Emergency Committee of the WHO, meeting in Geneva, could not agree if the events in China warranted a declaration of a Public Health Emergency of International Concern (PHEIC), but considered the situation urgent and to reconvene in a matter of days to examine the matter further. An advisory by the Committee to China included provision that exit screening be conducted at international airports and ports in the affected provinces.

On January 23, Chinese authorities lockdown Wuhan, a city of 11 million, which heightened the urgency for the U.S. response team. The Washington Post reported that Secretary Azar (HHS) instructed his team to establish a surveillance mechanism shortly thereafter, but the money and diagnostic tests "would elude U.S. officials for months". The entire Hubei province, which contains Wuhan, was locked-down January 30.

On January 23, the World Health Organization (WHO) published a statement on the coronavirus, indicating that: "Human-to-human transmission is occurring and a preliminary R0 estimate of 1.4–2.5 was presented. Amplification has occurred in one health care facility. Of confirmed cases, 25% are reported to be severe. The source is still unknown (most likely an animal reservoir) and the extent of human-to-human transmission is still not clear." At the time, the fatality rate was 4% (17 of 557). The WHO recommended that: "[A]ll countries should be prepared for containment, including active surveillance, early detection, isolation and case management, contact tracing and prevention of onward spread of 2019-nCoV infection, and to share full data with [the] WHO."

On January 23 the CDC sought an emergency use authorization (EUA) from the FDA enabling states to use its newly developed coronavirus test.

On January 24, the U.S. Senate was briefed on the coronavirus by key health officials. U.S. Senators Richard M. Burr, Kelly Loeffler, Dianne Feinstein, and James Inhofe allegedly sold stock thereafter, prior to significant declines in the stock market. In Senator Loeffler's case, the sales began the same day as the briefing. All denied any wrongdoing, citing various reasons. Senator Burr faced calls for his resignation.

On January 24, President Trump praised China for its coronavirus efforts in a tweet. Four days later WHO director Tedros met with Chinese President Xi Jinping in Beijing and praised the efforts of the Chinese government in fighting COVID-19.

Two more cases were confirmed on January 26, similarly by two people who had returned from Wuhan. All cases to this point were allowed to self-isolate at home for two weeks, whereafter they were assumed to be no longer infected or contagious.

On January 27, the WHO assessed the risk of the coronavirus to be "high at the global level".

In a January 27 press update the CDC reported that around 2400 travelers from Wuhan/Hubei had been screened so far, and that from all sources of surveillance there was an accumulation of 110 persons under investigation (PUI) from 26 states of which so far five persons had tested positive and 32 negative.

=== January 29–31 ===
On January 29, the U.S. formally announced a White House Coronavirus Task Force, including senior officials such as acting White House Chief of Staff Mick Mulvaney and others at HHS, CDC, and the U.S. State Department. President Trump attended the meeting on January 29, and tweeted related photos. However, the scope was limited initially to the logistics of keeping travelers out of the U.S. from China, and evacuating U.S. citizens. They did not initially focus on testing or supplies in the U.S.

On January 29, the U.S. government evacuated 195 State Department employees from Wuhan along with their families and other U.S. citizens to March Air Reserve Base near Riverside, California, where they were kept under quarantine for 14 days, although none had been infected.

The New York Times reported that President Trump was told "at the time" of a January 29 memo by trade adviser Peter Navarro that the coronavirus could cause as many as half a million deaths and trillions in economic damage. Further, on January 30, HHS Secretary Azar warned President Trump about the "possibility of a pandemic".

On January 29, WHO Health Emergencies program leader Dr. Mike Ryan said in a press briefing: "The whole world needs to be on alert now ... and be ready for any cases that come from the epicenter ..." At the time, 68 cases had been confirmed outside China, affecting persons in 15 countries.

On January 30, the first case of person-to-person transmission was confirmed in Chicago, between a married couple, after the wife returned from China.

On January 30, the WHO named the coronavirus outbreak that originated in Wuhan, China, a Public Health Emergency of International Concern, warning that "all countries should be prepared for containment, including active surveillance, early detection, isolation and case management, contact tracing and prevention of onward spread". The statement also praised the "impressive" Chinese response. The WHO also released a statement that included: "The Committee believes that it is still possible to interrupt virus spread, provided that countries put in place strong measures to detect disease early, isolate and treat cases, trace contacts, and promote social distancing measures commensurate with the risk." However, the federal government and individual states did not direct their populations to practice social distancing (e.g., stay at home except for essential travel) until March 19. Further, as late as April 8, five states had no social distancing rules and three others had rules for only parts of the state.

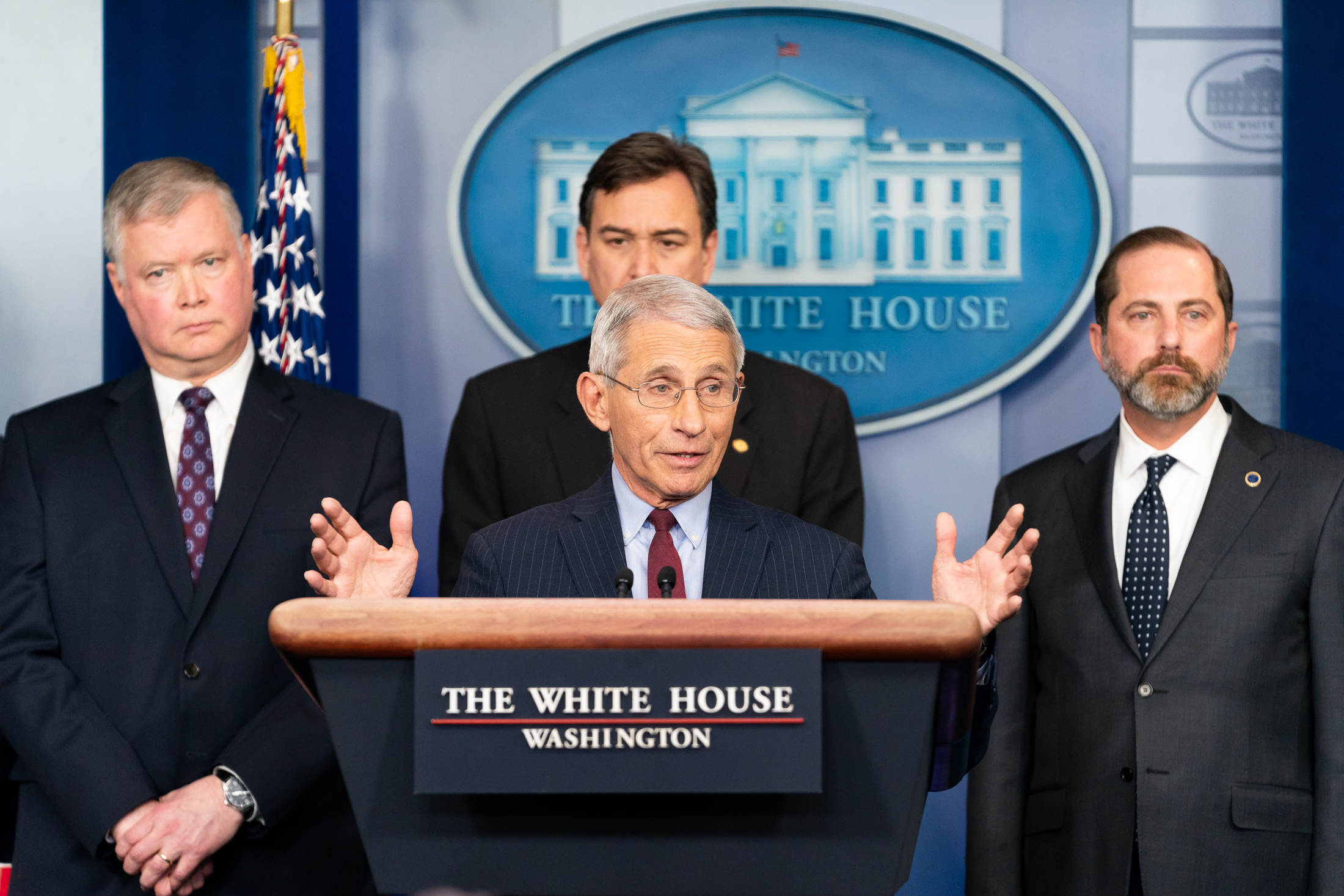
Anthony Fauci at a briefing of the Coronavirus Task Force on January 31

On January 31, another case of a person who returned from Wuhan was confirmed in California, which marked the seventh known case in the U.S.

On January 31, the Trump Administration, through the U.S. Department of Health and Human Services, declared a public health emergency, and imposed a mandatory 14-day quarantine for any U.S. citizens who has visited Hubei Province in China within the preceding two weeks. It also began denying entry of non-U.S. nationals who had traveled to China within the preceding two weeks. This was the first such travel restriction by the U.S. in more than 50 years.

On January 31, the Secretary of the Department of Homeland Security (DHS) in coordination with the CDC directed all flights to the U.S. carrying travelers recently from, or otherwise present within, the People's Republic of China to arrive at designated U.S. airports where public health resources had been focused. Three days later the airport list was expanded.

As of January 31, CDC had responded to clinical inquiries from state and local health departments, health care providers, and airport health screening personnel to assist in evaluating approximately 650 persons thought to be at risk for 2019-nCoV infection from travel, close contact with a 2019-nCov patient or person under investigation (PUI) for 2019-nCoV in the U.S.

President Trump repeatedly claimed credit for acting early with the travel ban. However, The Washington Post reported that 300,000 people traveled to the U.S. from China during the month prior to the ban. [The travel ban was not a ban, but a 14-day waiting period. Also, a month before January 31, not even WHO believed COVID had human-to-human transmission and there were no known cases in the United States until January 21. See January 14th above about WHO's lack of knowledge.] The New York Times reported that more than 40,000 persons traveled from China to the U.S. after the January 31 partial ban, and around 430,000 total between the December 31 disclosure of the outbreak by China and April 4. The Washington Post reported that six other countries had restricted travel from China before January 30, six did so on January 31, and by the time U.S. travel restrictions became effective on February 2, 38 other countries had taken action before or at the same time as the U.S. restrictions. The earliest action was Singapore on January 23. Flights from Europe were not banned until March 11, with hundreds of thousands crossing the Atlantic into the U.S., due to disputes about the impact on the U.S. economy among Trump Administration officials.

=== February ===
A senior DOD official holds a news conference at the Pentagon on February 3.

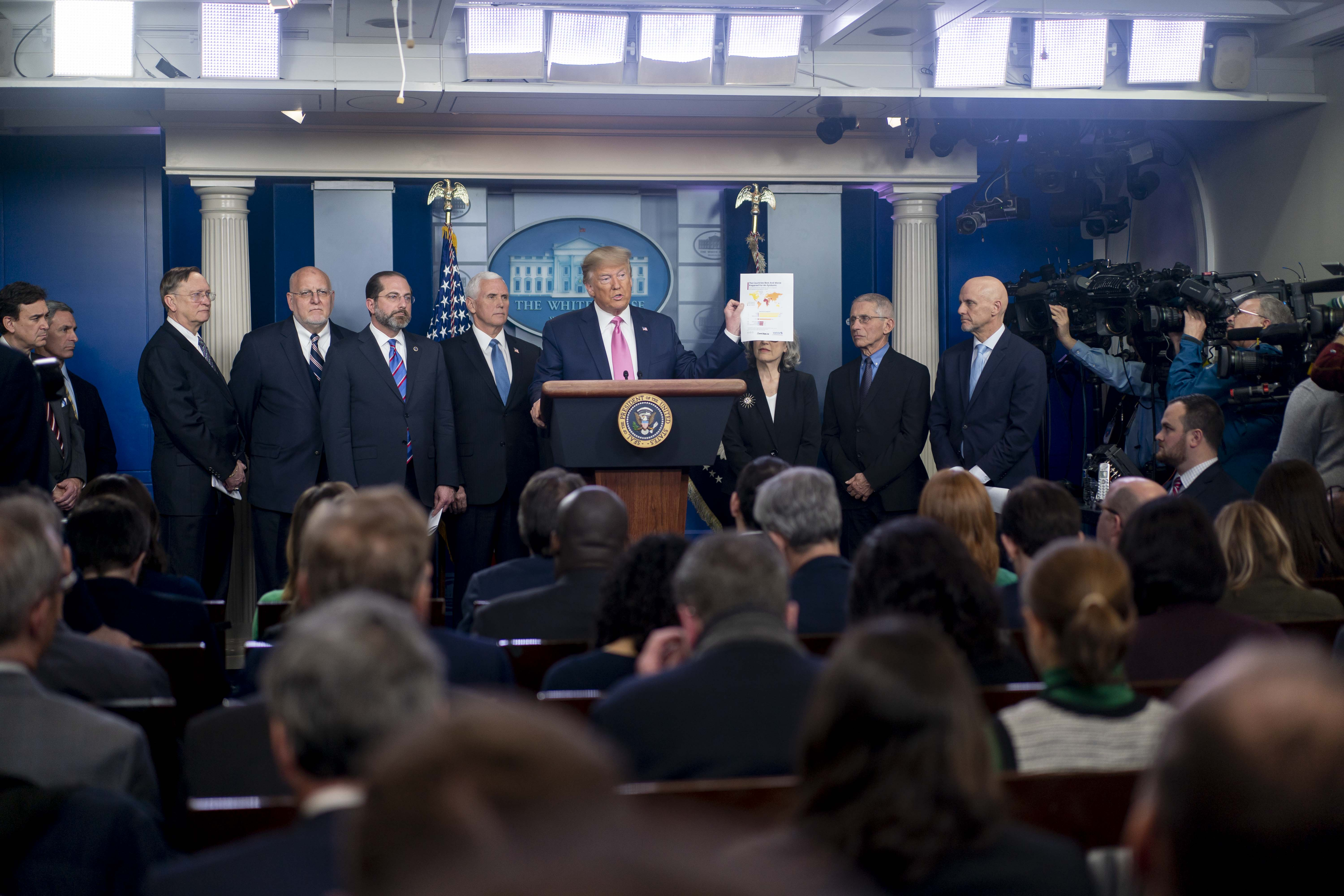
Members of the Coronavirus Task Force hold a press briefing at the White House on February 26.

==== February 1–15 ====
New cases were being reported throughout the country nearly every day. Many are people who have recently returned from China, including a college student from Boston and a woman in California who returned from Wuhan. Two more cases of person-to-person transmission are reported in California.

The Washington Post reported that HHS Secretary Azar, responding to concerns about a "startling" shortage of essential medical supplies (masks, gowns, gloves, etc.), wrote letters in late January and early February asking for additional funding. Since China also needed such supplies, replenishing them could be difficult as much of the manufacturing was in China. He also made a formal request for $4 billion on February 5, which "OMB officials and others at the White House greeted as an outrage". Congress later increased the figure to $8 billion, and Trump signed it into law on March 6 (two days after passage by Congress on March 4), but this delay meant that the U.S. would increasingly compete with other nations for such supplies.

On February 3, 49 members of Congress signed a letter to CDC Director Redfield highlighting the urgency of distributing a rapid diagnostic kit that could be processed locally, rather than centrally at the CDC in Atlanta, which they referred to as an "unsustainable bottleneck" as the number of suspected cases rise.

On February 3, Reuters reported that WHO chief Tedros Adhanom Ghebreyesus said there was no need for measures that "unnecessarily interfere with international travel and trade" to halt the coronavirus. He praised the Chinese response, and referred to the virus's spread as "minimal and slow".

On February 3, it was reported by Reuters from a briefing by Dr. Nancy Messonnier, director of the CDC's National Center for Immunization and Respiratory Diseases, that the CDC had a team waiting and ready to go to China as soon as they are allowed to go in.

On February 4, the FDA issued an emergency use authorization for the CDC diagnostic to test for coronavirus.

On February 5, the twelfth case is discovered: another college student from Wisconsin. That day, the U.S. evacuates 345 citizens from Hubei Province and takes them to two air bases in California to be quarantined for 14 days. Another government evacuation flight takes place on February 6, containing 300 passengers, most of who are taken to bases in Nebraska and Texas. By this time, more than 500 people are quarantined at three air bases.

On February 5, Health and Human Services Secretary Alex Azar and other top officials including Dr Anthony Fauci briefed Congressional lawmakers on the Federal Government's coronavirus response efforts.

On February 6, the Centers for Disease Control began sending 90 of its own viral detection tests to state-run labs which discovered the tests were inadequate and viral samples had to be shipped to the Atlanta CDC lab instead. Also on February 6, the WHO Director-General said: "We have shipped 250,000 tests to more than 70 laboratories around the world, and we're training lab workers to use them." Researchers at Stanford and other laboratories had developed tests following the WHO protocol, but "relatively tight" rules at the Food and Drug Administration discouraged them from using them. These rules were not relaxed until early March.

On February 6, 57-year-old Patricia Dowd of San Jose, California became the first COVID-19 death in the United States (discovered by April 2020). She died at home without any known recent foreign travel, after being unusually sick from flu in late January, then recovering, working from home, and suddenly dying on February 6. A February 7 autopsy was completed in April (after virus tests on tissue samples) and attributed the death to Transmural Myocardial Ischemia (Infarction) with a Minor Component of Myocarditis due to COVID-19 Infection. Her case indicates that community transmission was happening undetected in the US, most likely since December.

In a recorded interview later made public by journalist Bob Woodward, Trump said on February 7 that he knew the novel coronavirus was airborne and that "It's also more deadly than even your strenuous flus." For the next month, however, he would publicly minimize the threat of the virus, and told Woodward in March that "I wanted to always play it down. I still like playing it down, because I don't want to create a panic."

On February 9, The White House Coronavirus Task Force briefed governors from across the nation at the National Governors’ Association Meeting in Washington.

On February 11, WHO Director-General Tedros Adhanom Ghebreyesus said in a briefing: "[A] virus is more powerful in creating political, economic and social upheaval than any terrorist attack ... If the world doesn't want to wake up and consider this enemy virus and Public Enemy Number 1, I don't think we will learn our lessons." Ending six weeks of uncertainty the WHO, at a press conference the same day, announced the official name for the new illness (as abbreviated) -- 'Covid-19.' Concurrently the separate international body charged with classifying and naming viruses named the actual causative coronavirus 'SARS-CoV-2' (since it was considered to be a variant of the virus that in 2002–03 caused severe acute respiratory syndrome), but which name a WHO spokesperson advised Science magazine that WHO would not be using in part out of concern the word 'SARS' could cause "unnecessary fear"—or, as it was put by the BBC -- "extra panic."

On February 11, the Department of Health and Human Services (HHS) expanded a partnership with Janssen Research & Development, a part of Johnson & Johnson, to “expedite the development” of a coronavirus vaccine.

On February 14, the CDC announced it is working with the existing public health department network of community-based influenza surveillance intending to aid in early detection of coronavirus.

From February 12 to 15, three more cases are confirmed, all who travelled from Wuhan, and are similarly quarantined.

Numerous large conventions were held during this time frame and later February in NYC and Boston hotels, with thousands in attendance. One scientific-based convention in Boston seaport was documented to have spread the virus to the western suburbs and noted in the Globe newspaper. The national SCBWI convention in NYC drew thousands, mostly teachers, who attended a standing room only sessions featuring the best selling author James Patterson held in an oversized auditorium. They then returned to classrooms. There followed the extreme outbreak of the virus in the mid-Atlantic area, NYC and NJ in particular. People and presenters exhibited flu-like symptoms at the SCBWI convention.

==== February 15–29 ====
On February 15, the government evacuates 338 U.S. nationals stranded aboard the cruise ship Diamond Princess, which had been held in quarantine in Yokohama, Japan. Fourteen of those repatriated people are infected with the virus. Five more nationals who were also reported as being infected are evacuated from the ship the following week, and are quarantined at an airbase in California. Six more cases are subsequently confirmed among those who were evacuated from the cruise ship.

On February 18, HHS announced it would engage with Sanofi Pasteur in an effort to quickly develop a vaccine and treatments against the novel coronavirus.

The New York Times reported that the Chief Medical Officer of the Department of Homeland Security, Dr. Duane C. Caneva, continued hosting a series of coronavirus e-mail chains begun in January among a group of infectious disease experts from academia and government. The group referred to these chains as the "Red Dawn" e-mails, (a movie reference). On February 17, an e-mail from one participant indicated that the type of social gathering on the Diamond Princess cruise ship wasn't that different from a mall, school, or work environment. Another February 17 e-mail indicated that non-pharmaceutical interventions ("NPI") such as school and business closures would be difficult for local officials to direct without federal action to provide political cover. By the third week of February, the group had "effectively concluded that the United States had already lost the fight to contain the virus, and that it needed to switch to mitigation" such as NPI's. This was based on the "realization that many people in the country were likely infected and capable of spreading the disease, but not showing any symptoms". For instance, by the time of the European travel ban on March 11 (a containment strategy), the group considered such containment steps ineffective. Trump still had not directed NPI's as of March 11. As late as March 13, the CDC was still questioning the benefit of closing schools. Governors began to implement NPI's thereafter, "largely without federal leadership".

On February 20 and 21, two more cases of people who had returned from China are confirmed in California. The first case of community transmission, because it had no known origin, is confirmed in Solano County, California, on February 26. A second case of unknown origin is confirmed two days later, also in California, followed by others in Oregon and Washington state.

On February 22, a U.N. WHO team of international specialists from the U.S., Germany, Japan, Nigeria, Russia, Singapore, and South Korea arrives in Wuhan city.

By Mid-February, the U.S. was testing about a hundred samples per day. Researchers concluded in late February that "the virus had probably been spreading for weeks" person-to-person. The CDC test initially used three genetic sequences or "probes", but sometime after February 24, directed states to use a workaround of using two of the three probes and evaluating them locally.

As of February 23, fourteen COVID-19 cases had been diagnosed from six states: Arizona -1 case, California -8, Illinois -2, and Massachusetts, Washington, and Wisconsin, 1 case each). Twelve of the cases were related to travel to China, and two occurred through person-to-person transmission from close household contacts with confirmed COVID-19. An additional 39 cases were reported among repatriated U.S. citizens, residents, and their families returning from Hubei province China, and from the Diamond Princess cruise ship that was docked in Yokohama, Japan. Airport screening by then totaled 46,016 travelers of which 11 had been referred to a hospital with one testing positive, isolated, and managed medically. Seventeen had been quarantined because of travel from Hubei Province with 4 remaining. (The CDC would later have to conclude after months of further experience involving more than 700,000 screenings that temperature and symptom-based entry screening was ineffective likely due to multiple factors including an overall low COVID-19 prevalence in travelers, the relatively long incubation period, illness presentation with a wide range of severity, afebrile cases, nonspecific symptoms common to other infections, asymptomatic infections, and travelers who might deny symptoms or take steps to avoid detection of illness (e.g., through use of antipyretic or cough suppressant medications).

On February 24, President Trump tweeted: "The Coronavirus is very much under control in the USA ... CDC and World Health [Organization] have been working hard and very smart."

On February 24, Speaker Pelosi, when asked if people should stay away from San Francisco's Chinatown stated: "That’s what we’re trying to do today is to say everything is fine here." Pelosi said. "Come because precautions have been taken. The city is on top of the situation."

On February 25, HHS Secretary Azar testified before the U.S. Senate. National Geographic summarized his testimony, reporting that "the Strategic National Stockpile has just 30 million surgical masks and 12 million [N95] respirators in reserve." An additional 300 million of each could be required to protect health workers. HHS said it intended to purchase as many as half a billion respirators and surgical face masks over the next year and a half. National Geographic concluded that the "U.S. has only a fraction of the medical supplies it needs to combat coronavirus."

On February 25, Dr. Nancy Messonnier, Director of the CDC's National Center for Immunization and Respiratory Diseases, delivered a briefing indicating that "disruption to everyday life might be severe." The New York Times reported that President Trump was "furious", and HHS Secretary Azar attempted downplay her comments in a news conference later that day.

On February 26 at a news conference, President Trump said: "When you have 15 people, and the 15 within a couple of days is going to be down close to zero, that's a pretty good job we've done." The next day Dr. Redfield of the CDC testified to a House committee that "as of February 26, 2020 14 cases have been reported across 6 states, and 45 cases have been detected among people repatriated from Hubei, China and the Diamond Princess We expect to see additional imported cases and limited person- to-person spread. While community-wide transmission has not been documented yet in the United States, it is expected, and we are aggressively preparing for it.” He added: “Most cases of COVID-19 in the United States have been associated with travel from China, but some person-to-person spread among close contacts of travelers has been seen. It’s important to note that this virus is not spreading within American communities at this time.” The evolving understanding at that time by CDC/NIH experts was also expressed in a February 28 New England Journal of Medicine online editorial regarding the just published observations from Wuhan on the first several hundred cases which appeared to indicate that as an illness Covid-19 would be more akin to a severe seasonal influenza or a pandemic influenza rather than SARS or MERS, but of concern in being more efficient in transmission, as well as having comparatively increased infectivity when symptoms were minimal.

On February 26, Vice-President Mike Pence was appointed to lead the Coronavirus Task Force, replacing HHS Secretary Azar as the group's leader. Pence was the first official from within Trump's White House to coordinate the planning and response, two months after the government became aware of the coronavirus.

On February 28, the CDC revised its faulty test for COVID-19.

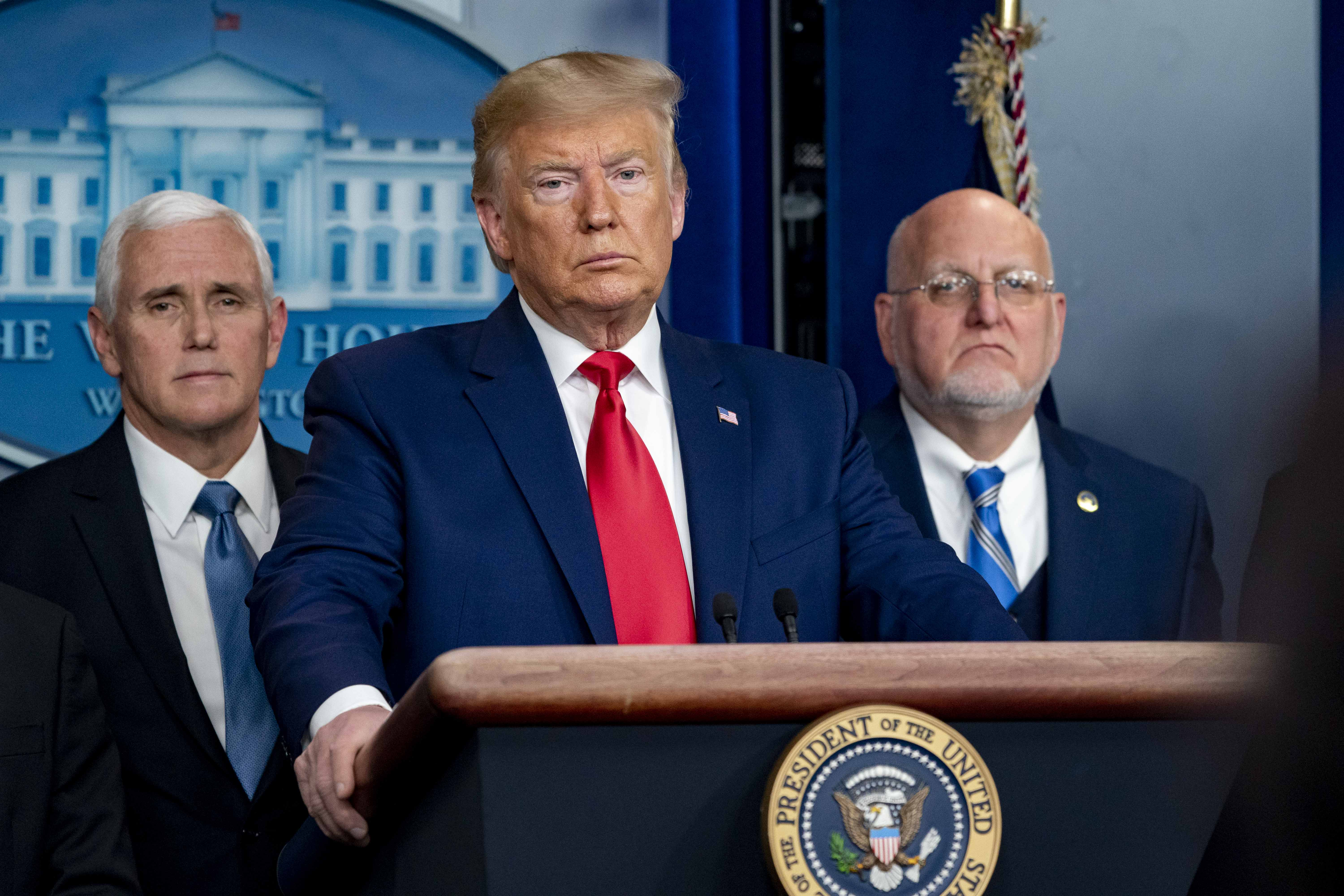
Mike Pence, Donald Trump and Robert R. Redfield (left to right) during the COVID-19 Task Force press briefing on February 29, 2020.

On February 29, the first death from coronavirus in the U.S. was reported at EvergreenHealth Medical Center in Kirkland, Washington, followed by two other confirmed cases in a nursing home in the same city. (Later, it would be reported that the first U.S. death had actually occurred on February 6.) On February 29, Governor Jay Inslee declared a state of emergency for the State of Washington. New cases continued to show up in California and Illinois. The Food and Drug Administration began loosening rules that had restricted labs from developing their own coronavirus tests.

=== March ===
==== March 1–2 ====
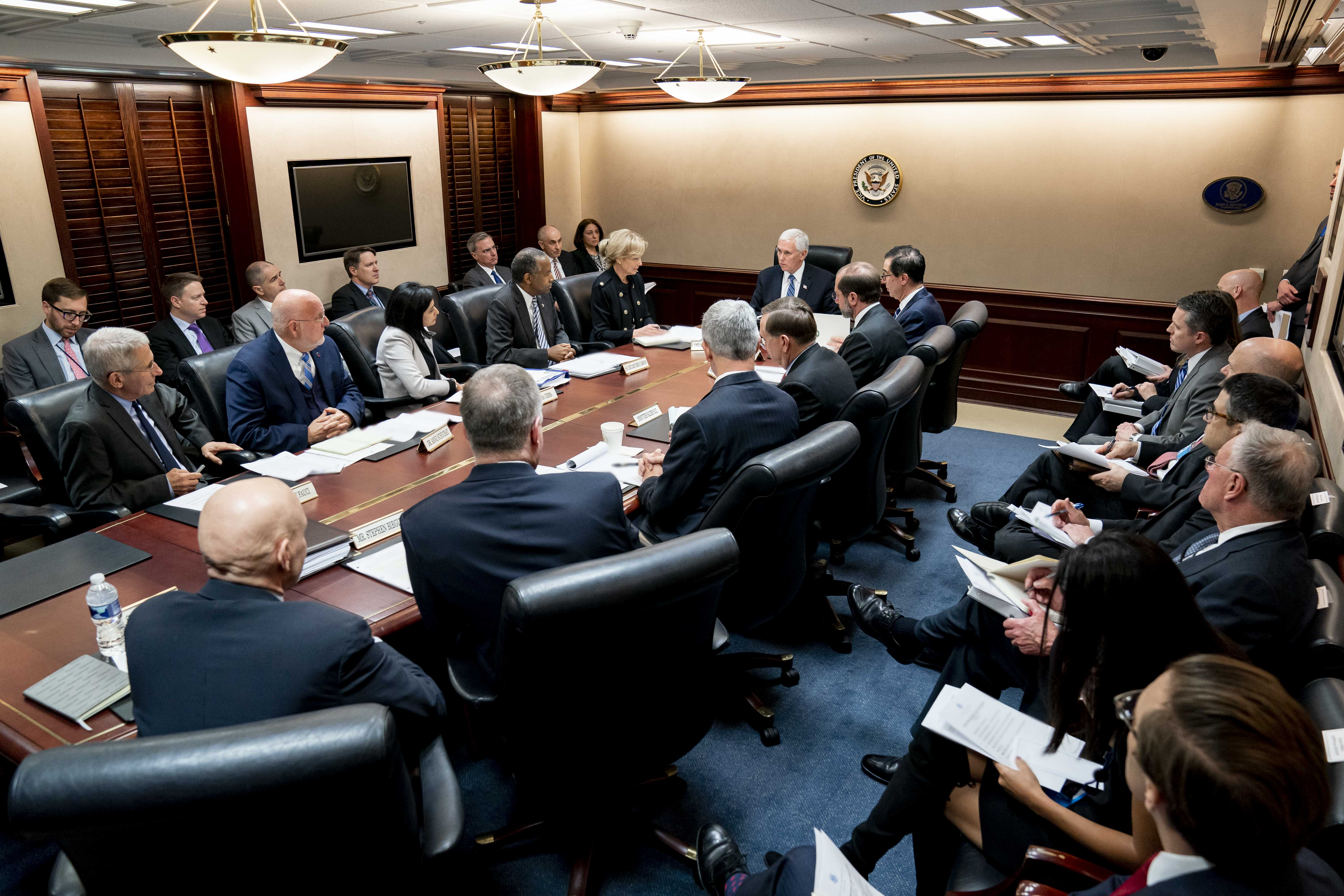
Vice President Mike Pence with White House coronavirus task force principals on March 2 in the White House Situation Room

In New York, Governor Andrew Cuomo announces the state's first reported case of COVID-19: a woman in her late 30s, who apparently contracted the virus while traveling in Iran and is self-isolating at home, in New York City. Oregon confirmed its second case, a household contact of its first case. The Rhode Island Department of Health announces a presumptive case in a person in their 40s who had traveled to Italy in mid-February, and a second case, a teenager who had traveled with the first person.

On March 2, coronavirus cases in the U.S. reach 100, including 48 from repatriated citizens from Wuhan or the Diamond Princess. New Hampshire officials announce the state's first case, an employee with Dartmouth–Hitchcock Medical Center who had been to Italy.

==== March 3 ====
On March 3, when the state has no confirmed cases, Ohio Governor Mike DeWine cancels the Arnold Classic due to coronavirus concerns, a move which The Washington Post said seemed radical at the time. On March 3, Arizona's Department of Health Services reports a new confirmed case in Maricopa County, a man in his 20s who had made contact with a case outside of Arizona. The man was isolated in his home. In New Hampshire, public health officials confirm a second case of coronavirus in an individual who made contact with the first case after the first case defied quarantine orders and attended a private event organized by Dartmouth College's Tuck School of Business in White River Junction, Vermont. New York officials announce the state's second confirmed case: a man in his 50s in New Rochelle, Westchester County who had not recently traveled to any foreign countries affected by the outbreak. In North Carolina, Governor Roy Cooper announces the state's first confirmed case: a person who had traveled to Washington and was "exposed at a long term care facility". They are in stable condition and in isolation at their home.

==== March 4 ====
- The U.S. Department of Homeland Security confirms that a "contract medical screener" for the CDC working at the Los Angeles International Airport tested positive for coronavirus. The individual was put in self-isolation at home.
- The CDC lifted federal restrictions on coronavirus testing to allow any American to be tested for coronavirus, “subject to doctor’s orders.”
- In California, Governor Gavin Newsom declares a state of emergency.
- In New York, officials confirm four new cases of coronavirus: the wife, son, and daughter of the second case, as well as the man's neighbor who drove him to the hospital. The new cases prompt the partial closure of the main campus of Yeshiva University, where the man's son is a student, as well as the high school in the Bronx borough of New York City where the daughter is a student. On the same day, another five confirmed cases are reported in a friend of the second case, as well as that friend's wife, two sons, and daughter.
- HHS announced the intent to purchase approximately 500 million N95 respirators over the following 18 months to respond to the outbreak of the novel coronavirus.
- Secretary Azar announced that HHS was transferring $35 million to the CDC to help state and local jurisdictions that have been impacted most by the coronavirus.

==== March 5 ====
Nevada, Colorado, Tennessee, and Maryland announce their first cases, New Jersey announces a second presumptive case, while Washington announces 31 new cases.

- Nevada: Public health officials in Las Vegas report that state's first confirmed case of coronavirus: a man in his 50s in Clark County who recently traveled to Washington state and Texas. Also, public health officials announce a second confirmed case of coronavirus in Reno. The new case, a man in his 50s, is in isolation at his home; the new case is linked to at least two other confirmed cases in Sonoma County, California and in Placer County, California among passengers who had been aboard the Grand Princess on a cruise from San Francisco to Mexico during the previous month.

==== March 6 ====
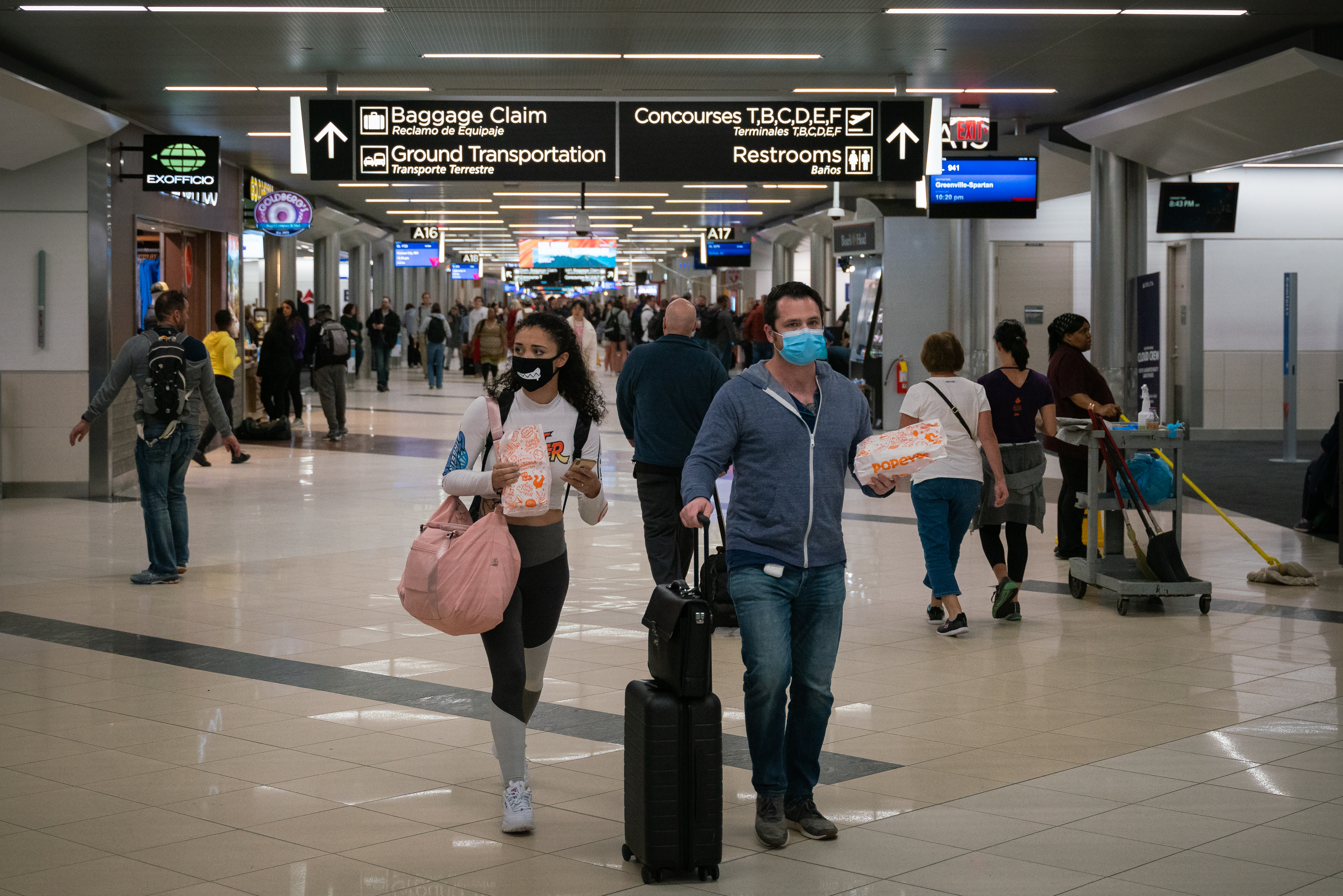
Airline passengers at Hartsfield-Jackson Atlanta International Airport wearing facemasks

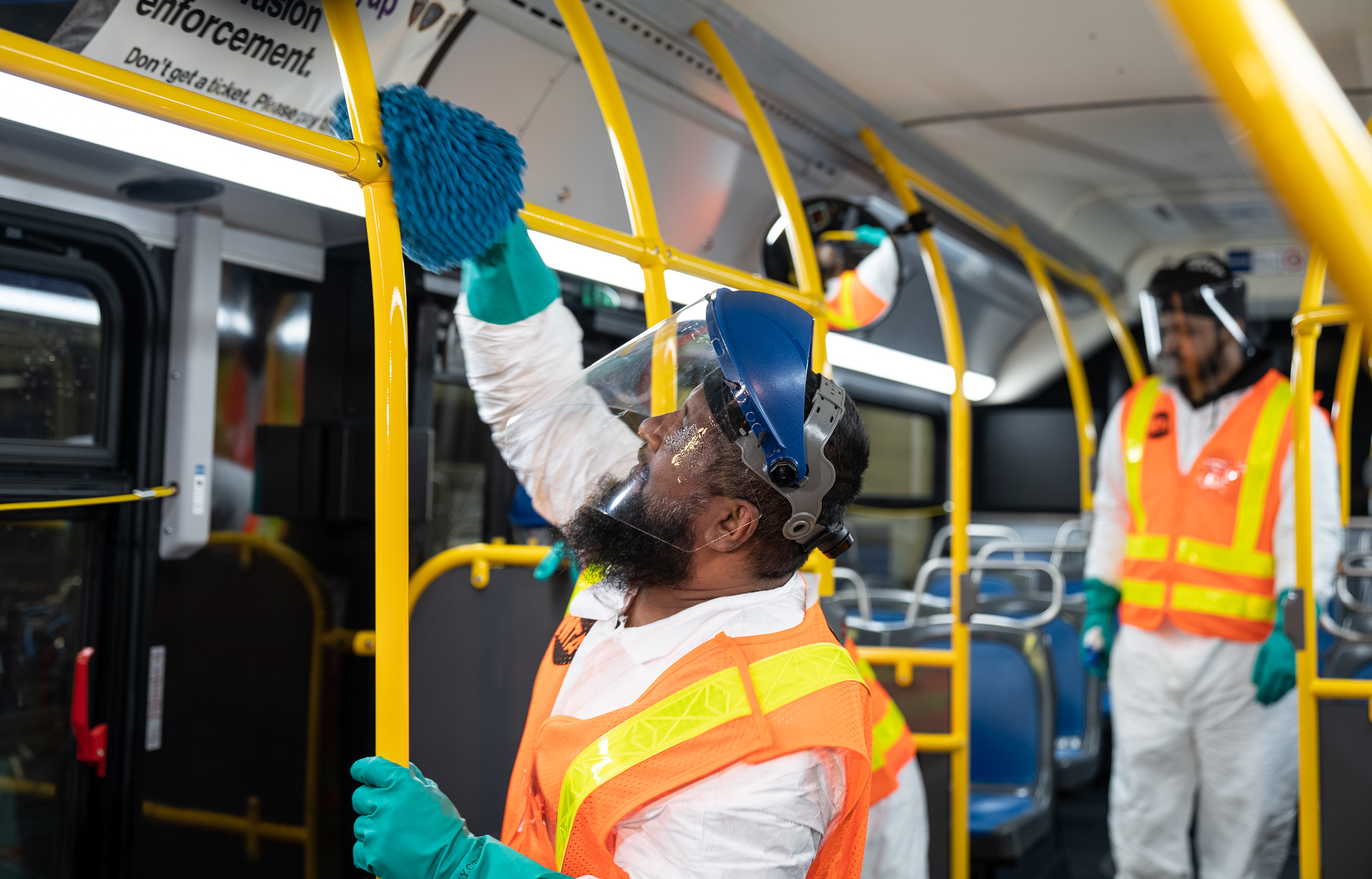
Metropolitan Transportation Authority workers sanitize a New York City bus.

Ten states report their first case of coronavirus: Hawaii, Utah, Nebraska, Kentucky, Indiana, Minnesota, Connecticut, South Carolina, Pennsylvania, and Oklahoma. Many cases are associated with passengers from the Grand Princess cruise ship, which is being held off the California coast near San Francisco. Testing on the ship reveals 21 positives. The day also sees 6 deaths reported. Four are reported from Washington, by the hospital that treated patients from the LifeCare long-term care facility. Two are reported from Florida, and represent the third state (after Washington and California) with reported deaths. This brings the total deaths to 18, 15 in Washington, 1 in California, and 2 in Florida.

- Grand Princess: Twenty-one passengers on the Grand Princess cruise ship test positive for the coronavirus, 19 staff and 2 passengers.
- Arizona: Public health officials announce the state's third case and first community transmission case in a Pinal County woman.
- Connecticut: Governor Ned Lamont confirm his state's first case of coronavirus in a hospital employee, a New York resident who is currently under self-quarantine back home in Westchester County, New York.
- Hawaii: Governor David Ige announces its first case of coronavirus, a resident that was a passenger of the Grand Princess which stopped in Hawaii in late February.
- Indiana: The state reports its first case in an Indianapolis man who returned from travel to Boston.
- Kentucky: Governor Andy Beshear confirms the states first case, a Lexington resident.
- Minnesota announces its first presumptive case, an elderly person living in Ramsey County, who had been on a cruise ship recently. The patient is reported to be in quarantine in their home.
- Nebraska: Governor Pete Ricketts announces the first presumptive positive case of coronavirus in Nebraska, a woman in her 30s from Douglas County who came back from England at the end of February. She was initially hospitalized at Methodist Hospital, and was being transferred to the Biocontainment Unit at the University of Nebraska Medical Center after her test result came back positive.
- North Carolina: Public health officials announce a second confirmed case of coronavirus in a man in Chatham County who had recently traveled to Italy.
- Oklahoma: Officials announce its first confirmed case of coronavirus in a Tulsa County man who had recently traveled to Italy.
- Pennsylvania: Governor Tom Wolf announces the first two confirmed cases of coronavirus in Delaware County and in Wayne County.
- Rhode Island: The state confirms its third case, a woman who had contact with a positive case in New York in late February.
- South Carolina reports two presumptive cases in Kershaw County and Charleston County.

The President signed an $8.3 billion bill providing $7.76 billion to federal, state, and local agencies for combating the coronavirus, and authorizing an additional $500 million in waivers for Medicare telehealth restrictions.

==== March 7 ====
Virginia, Kansas, Missouri, and Washington, D.C. announce their first cases. A new death is reported for March 7 in Washington. This brings the total confirmed U.S. deaths due to coronavirus to 19, 16 in Washington, 1 in California, and 2 in Florida. In Pennsylvania, Governor Tom Wolf announces two new positive cases in Montgomery County; both cases are related to travel within the United States.

==== March 8 ====
Iowa and Vermont report their first cases of infection with the coronavirus. Three new deaths were reported in Washington. This brought the total confirmed U.S. deaths due to coronavirus to 22: 19 in Washington, 1 in California, and 2 in Florida.

- Hawaii: Second case is reported by Governor David Ige and State health officials is an elderly man who tested positive after returning from travel to Washington state earlier in the month. He is hospitalized and in isolation at Kaiser Permanente' Moanalua medical facility.
- Indiana: Second and third cases are reported, both in Hendricks County. The third case is an elementary student, resulting in recommendation from Hendricks County Health Department for closure of Hickory Elementary school for two weeks beginning March 9. This is the first school closing to occur in Indiana due to the current outbreak.
- Iowa: Governor Kim Reynolds confirms the state's first three positive cases in Johnson County.
- Minnesota: The state of Minnesota reports a new case in Carver County and a total of 2 cases in Minnesota. The patient experienced symptoms on March 2, and is in the 50–59 age group. Thus far, both cases have been associated with travel.
- South Carolina: four more presumptive positive cases, for a total of six. One recently traveled to Italy, two are connected to a previous case, and one is of unknown origin.
- Vermont: Vermont health officials announced the state's first "presumptive positive" case in Bennington County.

==== March 9 ====
Speaking from the lectern at the White House Coronavirus Task Force press availability, President Trump says that the virus is "very much under control", was less deadly than influenza, and that the case count would soon approach zero. Explaining his approach to Woodward nine days later, he said, "I wanted to always play it down. I still like playing it down, because I don't want to create a panic." News organization CNN formally declares the COVID-19 outbreak a pandemic.

It is reported that the Trump administration, without explanation, postponed the Director of National Intelligence's (DNI) annual US World Wide Threat Assessment which warns that the U.S. remains unprepared for a global pandemic. The office of the DNI was scheduled to deliver the Assessment to the House Intelligence Committee on February 12.

- Ohio: Governor Mike DeWine declares a state of emergency after Ohio reports its first cases of COVID-19. As of March 9, Alabama, Alaska, Idaho, Maine, Michigan, Mississippi, New Mexico, North Dakota, South Dakota, and West Virginia have no cases, while Montana, Delaware, Wyoming and Arkansas have suspected cases. Washington reports 3 new deaths and California 1, bringing the number of U.S. coronavirus deaths to 26.
- California: Santa Clara County bans gatherings of 1,000 or more people, effective March 11.
- Indiana: A case is reported in Noble County, the state's 4th.
- Iowa: Five new presumptive positive cases are announced, bringing the statewide total to eight. Governor Reynolds signs a Proclamation of Disaster Emergency.
- Kentucky: Governor Beshear confirms two new cases bringing the state's total to six.
- Missouri: St. Louis County Executive Dr. Sam Page reports that the father and younger sister of the state's first coronavirus patient violated a self-quarantine order, attending a father-daughter function for her high school, Villa Duchesne, at the Ritz-Carlton Hotel in Clayton. The pair also attended a party for students from both Villa and the John Burroughs School before heading to the hotel. Villa cancels classes following the announcement, and the Burroughs students in attendance at the party were asked to stay home from school until further notice; they are ultimately cleared by medical professionals in consultation with the school later the same week, and the Ritz-Carlton was to undergo substantial cleaning.
- North Carolina: Five new presumptively positive cases are reported in Wake County. According to NCDHHS, all five had traveled to Boston in late February to attend a conference. This brings the total number of cases in North Carolina to 7.
- Ohio: The Ohio State University suspends face-to-face instruction until March 30. Governor DeWine declares a state of emergency.
- South Carolina: One additional presumptive positive case is reported, raising the total to 7. Additionally, there is a "possible" case at Clemson University.

==== March 10 ====
Location of the New Rochelle Containment Area within Westchester County, New York

South Dakota and Michigan report their first cases. Mitigation measures are expanded in New York, Massachusetts and Washington with a transition to online classes for universities and colleges. The first semi-containment zone is announced in New York. Two new deaths are reported in Washington and one death each in California, New Jersey, and South Dakota. This brings the total number of U.S. deaths to 31 (24 WA, 3 CA, 2 FL, 1 NJ, 1 SD).

- Massachusetts: Governor Charlie Baker declares a state of emergency as the number of cases doubles overnight to 92, 70 of them related to a meeting at Biogen in February. Harvard University orders its students to vacate the campus by Sunday, March 15.
- Minnesota: A third case in the state is confirmed in Anoka County. The individual is in the 30–39-year-old range and had no reported underlying conditions. The resident is in critical condition. According to health officials, the case was not transmitted in the state and there is no evidence that the virus is spreading from person to person in Minnesota. Governor Tim Walz signs a $21 million bill for funding COVID-19 preparedness.
- South Dakota: Health officials announce the state's first five confirmed cases and one death. The lone death tested positive for COVID-19, but the cause of death is still being investigated.

The President and VP Pence met with top health insurance companies and secured a commitment to waive co-pays for coronavirus testing and treatment.

==== March 11 ====
Confirmed coronavirus cases in the United States surpass 1,100. Arkansas, Delaware, Mississippi, New Mexico, North Dakota and Wyoming reported their first cases. More universities and colleges suspend classes or move to remote-access teaching. Washington Governor Jay Inslee orders a halt to all gatherings of greater than 250 in three counties, while Ohio Governor Mike DeWine orders all public gatherings of more than 1,000 people to be banned statewide. Five new deaths are reported in Washington and one death in California. This brings the total U.S. deaths to 37 (29 WA, 4 CA, 2 FL, 1 NJ, 1 SD).

- Connecticut: Several towns in Connecticut announce schools will close for at least two weeks beginning March 12, including New Canaan, where the state's third case was confirmed.
- Florida: A man wearing a mask and gloves (without symptoms) who had tested positive for coronavirus boards a JetBlue flight from JFK in New York to PBI Airport in West Palm Beach, potentially exposing both airports and an entire plane to the virus. Despite this, Florida officials release all passengers without requiring isolation or testing.
- Indiana: The state had five more cases, bringing the total to eleven. The University of Notre Dame announce that in-person classes will be suspended and moved online until at least April 13.
- Maine: The University of Maine in Orono announce that in-person classes will be cancelled for the remainder of the semester beginning March 23, and that all classes will be transitioned to online only. In addition, all students living on campus were required to be moved out by March 22.
- Minnesota: The University of Minnesota announces that all in-person classes will be suspended until at least April 1 following spring break. Two more cases were confirmed, bringing the total number of cases to five. The Mayo Clinic in Rochester began "drive-through testing" for the virus, though patients still needed to be approved to be tested by telephone screening.
- Missouri: Washington University in St. Louis announces a switch to online classes until at least late April and asked undergraduates to go home by March 15. University of Missouri's Columbia campus cancels classes March 12 and 13 and directs that in-person classes should be taught by other means for March 16 through 20 (prior to the March 21 through 29 spring recess).
- Mississippi: Health officials report the state's first case, a man who had recently traveled to Florida.
- New Mexico: Three presumptive positive cases, a couple in their 60s who recently traveled to Egypt and one in her 70s who recently traveled to the New York City area.
- Oklahoma: NBA player Rudy Gobert tested positive for COVID-19 prior to the game between the Utah Jazz and the Oklahoma City Thunder at Chesapeake Energy Arena in Oklahoma City. The game was postponed and the NBA announced that the 2019–20 NBA season would be suspended.
- South Dakota: Three presumptive positive cases, bringing state total to eight.

President Trump said in an Oval Office address: "The vast majority of Americans, the risk is very, very low."

During the March 11 national address the President directed the SBA to use its existing authorities to provide capital and liquidity to businesses impacted by COVID-19, effective immediately, and called on Congress to increase this fund by $50 billion (later to be expanded to 250 billion). In the address he also directed the Treasury Department to defer tax payments for affected individuals and businesses.

WHO Director-General Tedros said the WHO "made the assessment that COVID-19 can be characterized as a pandemic".

==== March 12 ====
Total U.S. cases passed 1,500. More universities and colleges transitioned to online attendance across the country. Public school closures are announced in Arkansas, Colorado, Connecticut, Kentucky, Maryland, Massachusetts, Michigan, New Mexico, Ohio, Utah, Virginia and Washington state. Georgia and Kansas report their first deaths and Washington state reports 2 additional deaths. This brings the total U.S. deaths to 41 (31 WA, 4 CA, 2 FL, 1 NJ, 1 SD, 1 GA, 1 KS).

Most major sports leagues, including MLS, the NHL, and the National Lacrosse League, announced the suspension of their seasons that were already in progress. The XFL terminated its inaugural season, while Major League Baseball announced the cancellation of all remaining spring training games and delayed the start of their 2020 season. In addition, the NCAA canceled all postseason tournaments in their winter and spring sports, which included the men's and women's basketball tournaments, as well as the baseball and softball tournaments. The cancellation of the basketball tournament marked the first time the tournament was not held due to unforeseen circumstances.

More business began to shudder from the losses COVID-19 inflicted. Several cruise ships had reported cases of infection from individuals aboard, both staff and passengers included. In order to prevent spread, cruise lines began to shut down. Yet the increase in incident and result made shipowners turn towards other measures in order to keep business alive. Such strategies included sending old ships away to shipyards to be abandoned and dismantled to focus costs on newer fleets.

- Alabama: Despite having no recorded cases in the state, the University of Alabama System as well as Auburn University both announced they are transitioning to online remote attendance when courses resume from spring break.
- Alaska: State officials announced the first positive case of coronavirus in the state.
- Colorado: The first school districts in the state, including Denver Public Schools, announced closures. An employee at University of Colorado Boulder tested positive for coronavirus. The Colorado Department of Corrections suspended in-person visitation in state prisons. The state reported 11 new cases.
- Connecticut: A number of school districts announced closures beginning on March 13 through at least March 27, including those in the cities of Bridgeport, New Haven, and Stamford, among several others.
- Delaware: Governor John Carney declared a state of emergency following the announcement of three more cases, connected with the University of Delaware.
- Hawaii: The University of Hawaii announced classes at all campuses will be held online beginning March 23. Chaminade and other colleges in the state follow suit. BYU-Hawaii suspends classes for three days to prepare for remote learning.
- Indiana: Went from 11 to 12 cases. Governor Holcomb Announces New Steps to Protect Public.
- Maine: Maine Governor Janet Mills announced the state's first confirmed case, a woman in her 50s in Androscoggin County. The woman is said to be quarantined inside her home.
- Minnesota: The Minnesota Department of Health has confirmed nine total cases in the state, affecting Anoka, Carver, Dakota, Hennepin, Olmsted, Ramsey, and Stearns counties.
- New Mexico: All public schools in the state will be closed for three weeks starting Monday, March 16.
- Ohio: The Ohio State University suspends all face-to-face classes for the rest of the spring semester. Spring break is extended until March 22 so that faculty have time to prepare. Students living in residence halls are to begin moving out. Mike DeWine is the first governor to announce statewide school closings: starting March 16 all K–12 schools in Ohio will be closed for three weeks. He also bans "mass gatherings" of 100 or more people.

On March 12, HHS placed its first order of N95 respirators for healthcare workers of $4.8 million. However, the supplier contract required delivery to begin around the end of April. Former HHS Secretary Kathleen Sebelius stated: "We basically wasted two months."

==== March 13 ====
Total U.S. cases passed 2,100. Colorado reported its first death, Florida and California both reported an additional death, and Washington state reported 6 additional deaths. This brought the total number of deaths in the U.S. to 50 (37 WA, 5 CA, 3 FL, 1 NJ, 1 SD, 1 GA, 1 KS, 1 CO). The NHL (National Hockey League) asked players to self-quarantine for a week or more in an attempt to save the season.

Later that day, President Trump took a COVID-19 test after coming into contact with several people who had contracted the disease and found to be negative. On March 13 the House passed an aid package for workers and individuals that was supported by President Trump.

In a March 13, 2020, report "not for public distribution", the United States Department of Health and Human Services (HHS) used the working assumptions for their response plan, that the COVID-19 "pandemic will last 18 months or longer and could include multiple waves of illness", and that resultant "supply chain and transportation impacts" would "likely result in significant shortages".

President Trump issues the Proclamation on Declaring a National Emergency Concerning the Novel Coronavirus Disease (COVID-19) Outbreak, declaring a national state of emergency.

- Alabama: First case announced in Montgomery County.
- California: Santa Clara County bans gatherings of more than 100 people and conditionally bans gatherings of 35–100 people, effective March 14.
- Georgia: Governor Brian Kemp declared a public health emergency in the state of Georgia.
- Idaho: The state's first confirmed case was announced, a woman in her 50s who recently traveled to New York.
- Illinois: All schools are closed beginning Tuesday, March 17 through the end of March.
- Kentucky: First of Kentucky's COVID-19 patients to be declared fully recovered is discharged from University of Kentucky Medical Center.
- Minnesota: Governor Walz declares a state of emergency and asks the state legislature to pass several emergency bills, including one to help speed up testing for the virus. He also urges that all events with 250 or more attendees be cancelled or postponed.
- Missouri: Two more presumptive positive cases were reported, bring the total number of cases up to 4. St. Louis County declares a state of emergency and bans gatherings larger than 250 people.
- New Hampshire: Governor Christopher Sununu declares a state of emergency in New Hampshire due to COVID-19. Six cases are confirmed.
- Oregon: Governor Kate Brown announces a statewide K–12 school closure through to the end of March.
- Pennsylvania: Governor Wolf announces that all Pennsylvania schools will close for ten days.
- Rhode Island: 20 cases are confirmed.
- South Carolina: Governor Henry McMaster declares a state of emergency and closes schools in Kershaw and Lancaster Counties for 14 days due to evidence of the virus's spreading in these counties.
- South Dakota: One new case in McCook County. Governor Kristi Noem declares a state of emergency, all schools to close between March 16–20.
- West Virginia: While the state still had no confirmed cases of COVID-19, Governor Jim Justice announces all schools across the state would close beginning on March 16, 2020, for an indefinite period of time as a proactive measure.

The President's national emergency proclamation enabled FEMA to tap into billions of existing dollars and mobilize personnel more quickly to help state and local agencies respond to the pandemic. The Administration also announced public-private partnerships to open up drive-through testing collection sites, an emergency approval for automated coronavirus testing kits by FDA to Roche AG, emergency approval to Thermo Fisher for a rapid coronavirus test, funding by HHS for development of two new rapid diagnostic tests.

On March 13, Reuters reported that Germany and Italy ordered 10,000 and 5,000 ventilators, respectively. The U.S. follows with a 10,000 ventilator order in late March, with many not expected to arrive until the summer or fall, too late for the expected peak impact.

In mid March U.S. auto manufacturers were enlisted to make ventilators and production started in a little less than a month.

==== March 14 ====
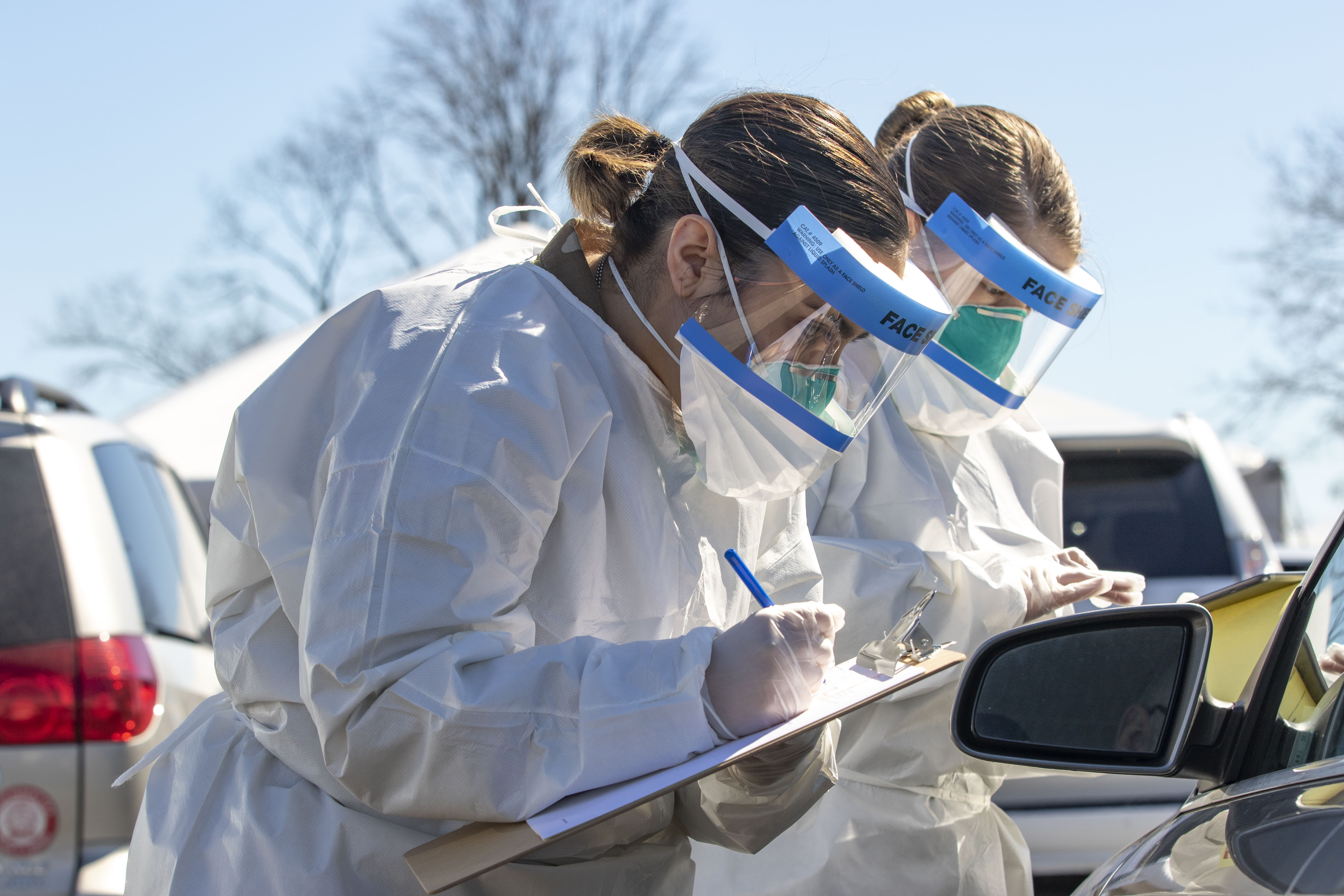

The total U.S. cases passed 2,700. Five additional deaths were reported by state health departments: three in Washington, one in Florida, and one in Louisiana. In addition, New York's first death was reported in the news media and the governor of New Jersey announced the state's second death on Twitter. This brought reported deaths to 7 for the day.

- North Carolina: All schools ordered to close for two weeks. Governor Roy Cooper also issued an executive order to prevent mass gathering.
- Ohio: Governor DeWine and Department of Health Director Amy Acton on March 14 recommended Ohioans postpone elective surgeries.
- Oklahoma: Governor Kevin Stitt took a selfie with his family in a crowded restaurant. Stitt tweeted, "It's packed tonight!" and was criticized on social media for ignoring social distancing. Stitt deleted the tweet in response to the backlash.
- Virginia: Governor Ralph Northam announced Virginia's first death from the coronavirus.

==== March 15 ====
On March 15, the CDC issued guidance recommending against any gathering of 50 or more people for an eight-week period.

- Alabama: The Alabama Department of Public Health counted 22 cases of coronavirus: Jefferson County, 12 cases; Tuscaloosa County, 3 cases; Shelby County, 2 cases; Baldwin County, Elmore, County, Lee, Limestone, and Montgomery Counties, 1 case each.
- Arizona: Governor Doug Ducey and Superintendent Kathy Hoffman ordered all schools closed through March 27.
- Connecticut: All schools ordered closed after March 16 until at least March 31.
- Illinois: Governor J. B. Pritzker announces that the state will order restaurants and bars to close to dine-in customers.
- Maine: Governor Mills declares a state of emergency with 7 cases confirmed.
- Minnesota: There are now 35 confirmed cases with at least three spread person-to-person in the state. Governor Walz closes all schools from March 18 until at least March 27. During the shutdown meals and mental health services will still be provided to students in need. Under the governor's order, schools will remain open for the elementary-aged children of health care workers and other emergency workers. Teachers will be using this time to plan for a possibility of weeks of long-distance learning.
- New Hampshire: Governor Sununu orders all public K–12 schools to transition to remote learning effective Monday, March 16 through April 3, 2020, requiring remote learning to begin by March 23, 2020.
- North Carolina: Mecklenburg County which encompassed the city of Charlotte declared a state of emergency in the county after 2 more new cases are found in the county, bringing the total in the county to 4 and the total statewide to 33.
- North Dakota: Governor Burgum ordered all schools to be closed from March 16 to March 20. It was confirmed the state lab had tested 112 individuals for the virus with one case coming back positive from a person with travel history.
- New York: New York City mayor Bill de Blasio announces New York City public schools, the largest public school system in the country, will close starting Monday, March 16. The closure will last at least through April 20.
- Ohio: Governor DeWine orders all bars and restaurants to close beginning at 9:00 pm. Establishments may continue providing take-out and delivery services.
- Oklahoma: Governor Stitt declares a state of emergency.
- Puerto Rico: Governor Wanda Vázquez Garced issues an island-wide curfew through March 30 and closes all businesses not involved in food sales, medicine, or banking.
- South Carolina: Governor McMaster announces school closures starting on March 16. The city of Myrtle Beach declares a state of emergency and closes city facilities that are normally open to the public, including the city library and recreation centers. Nine new cases confirmed in South Carolina, bringing the total to 28.

==== March 16 ====
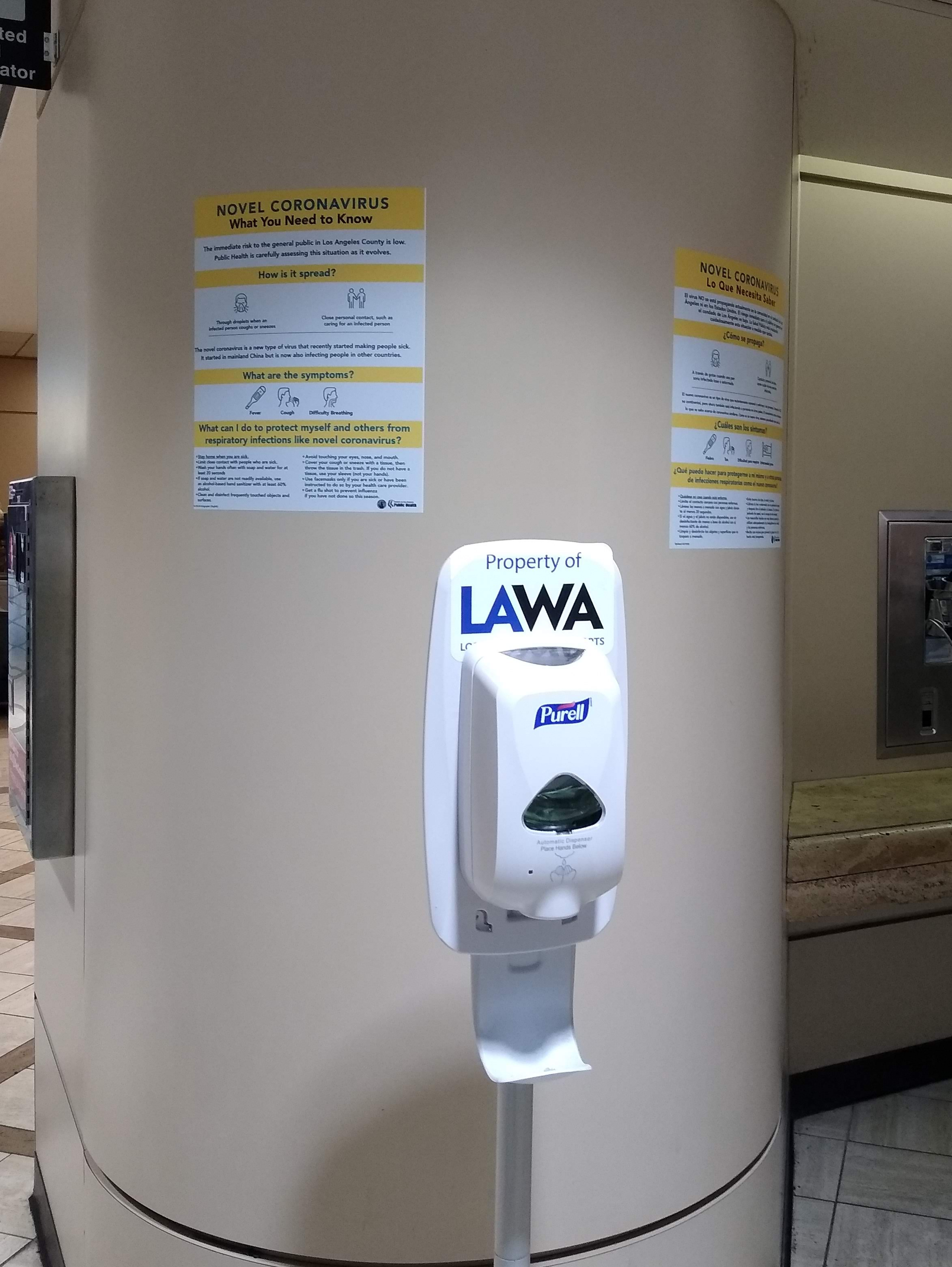
Hand sanitizer and signs about COVID-19 at Los Angeles International Airport

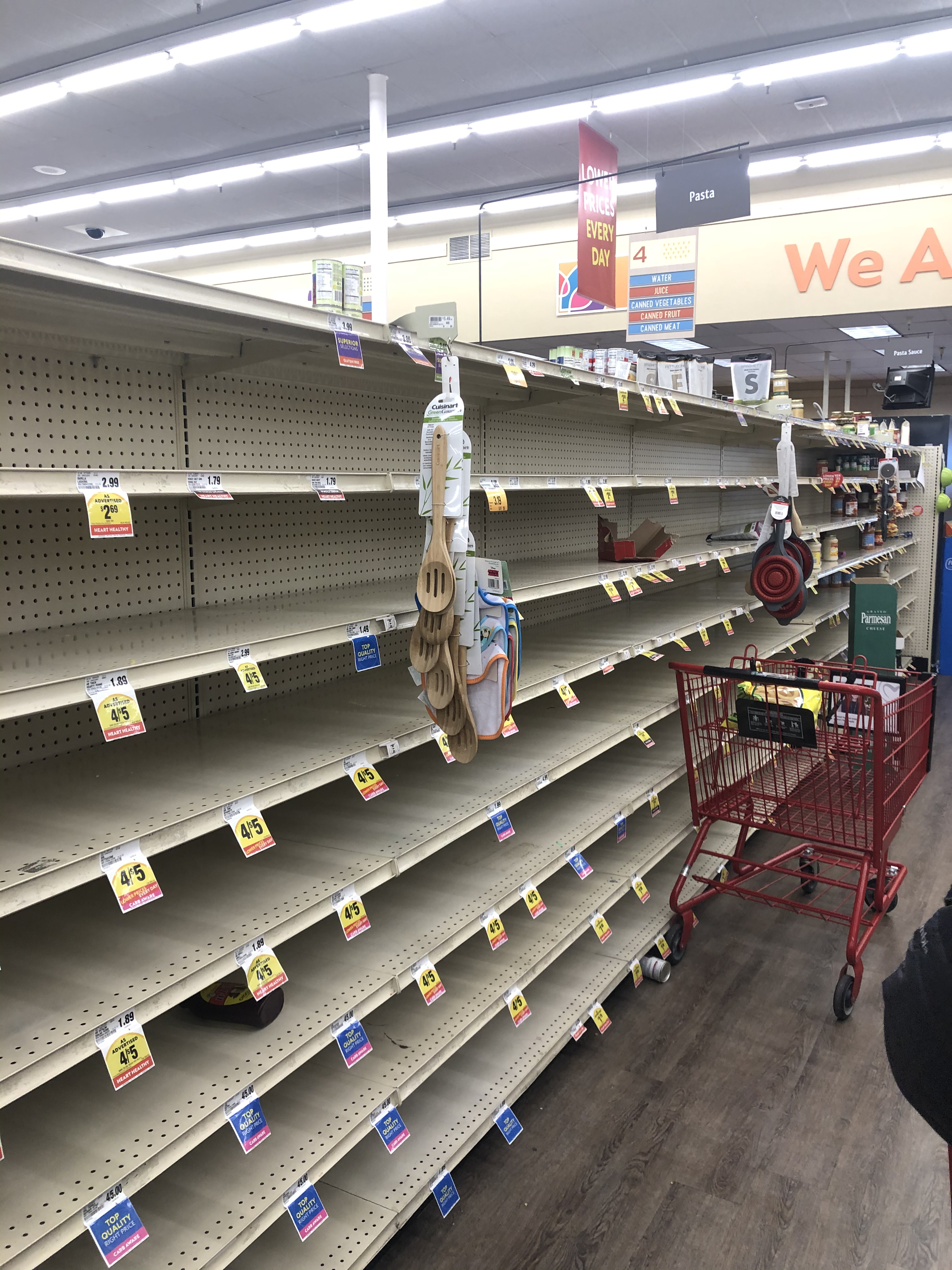
Empty shelves in a Lucky supermarket in Foster City, California.

President Trump issued new guidelines urging people to avoid social gatherings of more than ten people and to restrict discretionary travel. He stopped short of ordering a quarantine or a curfew, but he said restrictions may last until July or August. He acknowledged that the country may be headed for a recession. Despite the fact that the Federal Reserve Bank lowered interest rates the day prior, the stock market fell once again.

- California: With 258 cases and 3 deaths in 7 Bay Area counties, 6 issue shelter-in-place orders.
- Colorado: Colorado announced 29 new positive cases of COVID-19, bringing the state total to 160. Mayor Hancock of Denver orders all bars and restaurants to close by 8:00 am starting March 17 (excepting food delivery and pickup) and bans gatherings of more than 50 people in the city. Governor Polis expanded the closures by ordering a state-wide closure of dine-in services. Polis also ordered the closure of gyms, casinos, and theaters.
- District of Columbia: The Supreme Court of the United States postponed oral arguments scheduled for late March and April 1. Similar precautions were taken in 1918 in response to the Spanish flu and in 1798 and 1793 in response to Yellow fever outbreaks. 18 cases of coronavirus have been reported in DC.
- California: As of 12:01 am Monday, March 16, Los Angeles Mayor Eric Garcetti ordered all bars, movie theaters, gyms and fitness centers closed, and for restaurants to limit themselves to take-out and delivery only.
- Minnesota: Several clinics, including Mayo and M Health Fairview are reporting only positive tests, not the total number of tests. Affected counties now include Anoka, Benton, Blue Earth, Carver, Dakota, Hennepin, Olmsted, Ramsey, Renville, Stearns, Sherburne, Waseca, Washington, and Wright. Governor Walz has ordered the closure of public places, including all: restaurants, bars, coffee shops, gyms, theaters, breweries, ski resorts, and other public places until at least March 27. Bars and restaurants in the state were closed only to dine-in customers; the businesses were allowed to continue to serve customers by take out or delivery orders. He said this order may be extended.
- Ohio: The state has 50 confirmed cases of COVID-19. Bowling alleys, fitness centers, gyms, movie theaters, public recreation centers, trampoline parks, and water parks are ordered to be shut and gatherings of more than 50 people are banned. Governor DeWine announces the presidential primary elections, scheduled for the next day, will be cancelled on orders of Department of Health director Amy Acton.
- Oklahoma: Ten cases of coronavirus have been confirmed; Governor Stitt declares a state of emergency.
- Oregon: Governor Brown and public health officials issue new statewide mandates, banning all public gatherings of 25 or more people and restricting restaurants to take-out or delivery service. Only essential businesses such as grocery stores, pharmacies, retail stores and workplaces are exempted.
- Pennsylvania: Governor Wolf extends a shutdown order to the entire state. The order was originally for four southeastern Pennsylvania counties outside Philadelphia.
- Vermont: Public schools began a transition in which student attendance was optional Monday, March 16 and Tuesday, March 17, but faculty and staff were expected to attend to help with an orderly shut down, with schools tentatively to reopen April 7. Plans were being made to continue providing special needs services and meals for those students who depend on them.
- Texas: The first death from the coronavirus occurred in Matagorda County.
- Washington (state): Boeing announces it plans to continue building airplanes and will enhance cleaning procedures in workspaces, common areas and on high-touch surfaces in its assembly plants. The company also has a plant in South Carolina.

==== March 17 ====
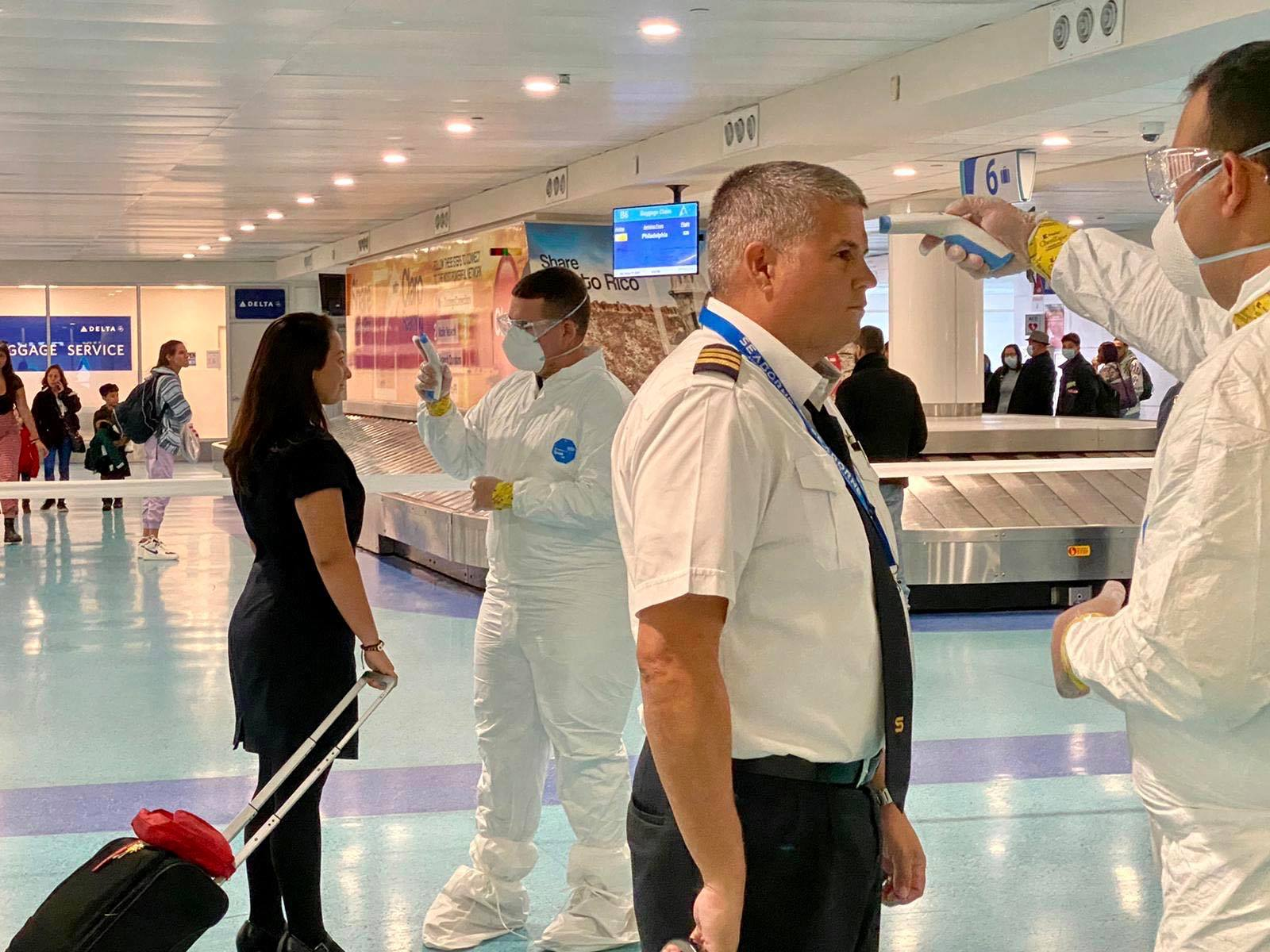
Temperature screening of arrivals at Luis Muñoz Marín International Airport, Puerto Rico

5,145 people in the United States had been infected; at least 91 had died. The Peace Corps fired all 7,300 volunteers in 61 countries.

- Alabama: Alabama had a total of 39 cases, where the majority of them (21 cases) are located in Jefferson County.
- Alaska: Alaska confirmed three new cases, bringing the total to six. Alaska government banned dine-in food service.
- Arkansas: Arkansas reports, the first time in almost a week, that there are no new cases in the state.
- California: Beginning at 12:01 am on Tuesday, March 17, San Francisco, Marin, Santa Clara, Santa Cruz, San Mateo, Contra Costa, and Alameda Counties (combined population seven million) are placed under a mandatory "shelter in place" order.
- Florida: Governor of Florida announces it has 24 new cases, increasing the total to 216 cases. The governor also orders businesses that sell liquor to reduce their occupancy by half, and to limit parties on beaches to only ten people per group.
- Kansas: Governor Laura Kelly orders all K–12 schools to close for the remainder of the school year.
- Illinois: The state announces its first death as 55 new cases are added, including 22 at a nursing home in Willowbrook, DuPage County, Illinois. The state total is now 166. Turnout for the 2020 Illinois Democratic primary was low, but Chicago broke a World War II-era record for mail-in voting.
- Maryland: Maryland postponed all state primaries until June 2 to reduce the risk of coronavirus infection to the Marylanders.
- Minnesota: The Minnesota Department of Health announces that due to the national shortage of materials for medical testing for the virus they will be limiting testing to those who are hospitalized, ill healthcare workers and those who live in long-term care facilities. The restrictions will be in place until the state is supplied with additional tests.
- North Carolina: The state announces it has 65 confirmed coronavirus cases. The state also announces it had conducted 1,100 tests.
- Ohio: The state had 67 confirmed cases. Governor DeWine orders elective surgeries be postponed.
- Pennsylvania: All liquor stores closed indefinitely.
- South Carolina: Governor McMaster issues an executive order requiring the mandatory shutdown of dine-in service in restaurants and bars and prevented a gathering of more than 50 people. The state also had 47 cases.
- Oregon: The governor extended school closures through April 28.
- South Dakota: Closure of K–12 schools extended an extra week. Set to resume on March, 30.
- Texas: The second death in Texas is reported. A resident of a retirement community in Arlington died on Sunday, March 15.
- Virginia: Governor Northam announces a ban on gatherings of more than 10 people. 15 new cases are reported, bringing the total to 67 cases in Virginia.
- West Virginia: Confirmed its first case; it was the last state to do so.

As of March 17, vessel manifests maintained by U.S. Customs and Border Protection showed a steady flow of the medical equipment needed to treat the coronavirus being shipped abroad. FEMA, meanwhile, said the agency "has not actively encouraged or discouraged U.S. companies from exporting overseas", and has asked USAID to send back its reserves of protective gear stored in warehouses for use in the U.S.

President Trump told reporters: "This is a pandemic ... I felt it was a pandemic long before it was called a pandemic."

The Department of Defense announced it will make available to HHS up to five million respirator masks and 2,000 ventilators.

Secretary of Agriculture Perdue announced a partnership between USDA, Baylor University, McLane Global, and Pepsi Co. to provide one million meals per week to rural children in response to widespread school closure.

The Treasury Department deferred $300 billion in tax payments for 90 days without penalty, up to $1 million for individuals and $10 million for business.

==== March 18 ====
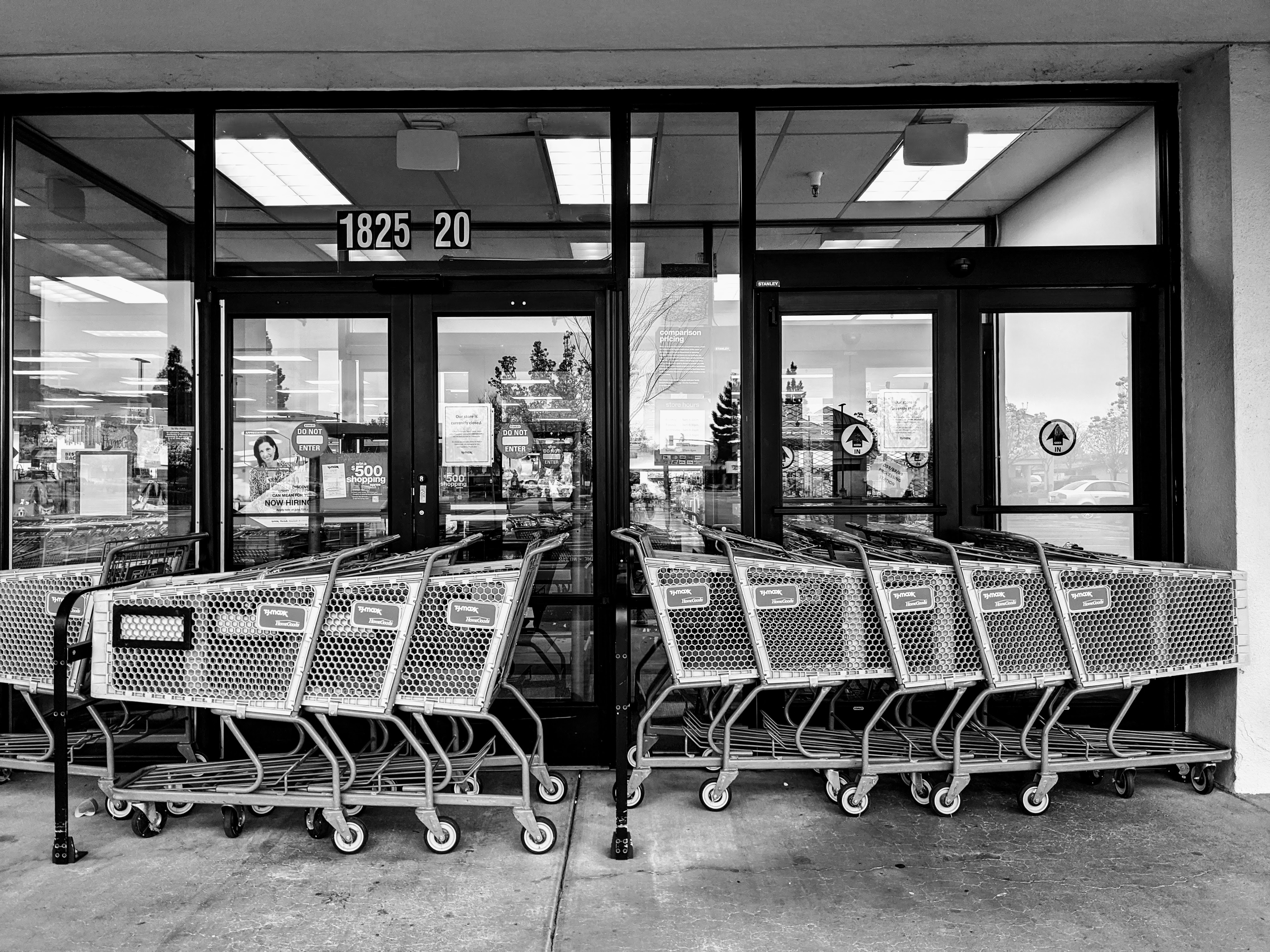
Carts block the entrance to a closed store in San Jose, California.

- California: Governor Gavin Newsom issues the country's first statewide stay-at-home order.
- Florida: U.S. congressman Mario Díaz-Balart is one of the first members of Congress to be tested positive for coronavirus. Thousands of spring-breakers flock to Florida beaches despite warnings about keeping social distance. The Clearwater City Council voted to close down Clearwater Beach for two weeks, starting March 23 at 6 a.m. The coronavirus has infected 328 Florida residents and visitors.
- Kentucky: The wife of Louisville mayor Greg Fischer tested positive for coronavirus.
- Louisiana: Reverend Tony Spell of Life Tabernacle Church in East Baton Rouge Parish hosts hundreds at a church service in open defiance of Governor John Bel Edwards' (D) ban against gatherings of more than 50 people.
- Maryland: The state added 22 more coronavirus cases, to the total of 63 cases.
- Michigan: The first death from coronavirus in the state is reported, a man in his 50s who had underlying medical conditions. The state also announces 30 more confirmed cases, bringing the total number there to 110.
- Minnesota: Governor Walz criticizes the federal response to the virus. The state had approximately 1700 frozen samples to be tested, but had not yet been, due to the lack of facilities for testing. The state had 77 positive results out of at least 2762 tests.
- Montana: Governor Steve Bullock announces 2 additional cases in Gallatin County, bringing the confirmed total to 12 in Montana.
- North Carolina: The number of cases in the state jumped to 81.
- Ohio: The state has 88 confirmed cases across 19 counties. 26 cases involved hospitalization. Governor DeWine announces 181 Divisions of Motor Vehicle locations will close until further notice. Five will stay open to process commercial driver license applications and renewals, and he proposes a grace period for people whose licenses have expired. Barbershops, salons, and tattoo parlors are closed. Businesses that do stay open are asked to take their employees' temperatures every day before allowing them entry to work and to send sick employees home. Mayor Andrew Ginther declares a state of emergency in Columbus, Ohio.
- Oregon: Governor Brown issues executive order extending the closure of K–12 public schools until April 28.
- Pennsylvania: The state announces its first death in Northampton County following the addition of 37 new cases bringing the total to 133 cases.
- South Carolina: The state confirms more cases of the COVID-19, totaling at 60 cases.
- Utah: U.S. congressman Ben McAdams tests positive for coronavirus.

==== March 19 ====
Three thousand doctors and medical workers sign a letter asking ICE to release individuals and families detained for immigration violations, noting that overcrowded conditions are ripe for the propagation of a virus.

- California: The state has ordered the closure of all museums, malls and other all non-essential workplaces effective March 20 11:59 p.m. All 40 million citizens in the state are ordered to stay home. More than 900 state residents have been infected and 19 have died. The Academy of Motion Picture Arts and Sciences is considering changing its criteria for qualifications in the 2021 Oscar ceremony because so many movie theaters are closed.
- Hawaii: Two cruise ships are prevented from disembarking despite not having any cases of COVID-19 on board.
- Massachusetts: The Massachusetts Medical Society says there is a "dire" shortage of protective medical equipment in the state.
- Michigan: The state reports two additional coronavirus deaths. Meanwhile, the total number of cases in the state rises to 334, an increase of 254 from the previous day. Officials attribute the spike to an increase in testing.
- North Carolina: The state confirmed its first community spread of the coronavirus. The number of cases in North Carolina rises to 134. ProPublica reveals that Senator Richard Burr (R-NC) allegedly used his position as chairman of the Senate Intelligence Committee to mislead the public about COVID-19. He personally made between $582,029 and $1.56 million by selling off stock days before the market crashed. Police in Guilford County, North Carolina stopped a truck with nine tons of stolen toilet paper.
- Ohio: The state has 119 cases of COVID-19 resulting in 33 hospitalizations. Governor DeWine signs state active duty proclamation that will activate 300 personnel from the Ohio National Guard to help with humanitarian efforts.
- Pennsylvania: The state's department of education announces that all statewide assessments will be canceled for the remainder of the 2019–2020 school year. Pennsylvania has a current total of 196 coronavirus cases. Governor Wolf ordered a statewide shutdown of "non-life sustaining businesses" by 8:00 p.m. Enforcement of this order is planned to begin at 12:01 a.m. Saturday, March 21.
- South Carolina: Governor McMaster issues a new executive order: all non-essential state employees stay home. Public universities are also encouraged to finish the semester online. 81 cases are confirmed in the state.
- Virginia: Virginia officials are requesting law enforcement to avoid arrests while possible. The administration also asks magistrates and judges to consider alternatives to incarceration. Virginia reports 24 new COVID-19 cases, bringing the total to 101.

==== March 20 ====
The U.S has 19,285 confirmed cases of COVID-19 resulting in 249 deaths.

- California: Los Angeles Mayor Eric Garcetti promises that no one will go to jail for violating the stay-at-home order that goes into effect at midnight. However, a major purpose of the order is to provide enforcement for businesses that are not complying. Marijuana dispensaries are classified "essential".
- Illinois: Governor Pritzker issues a stay-at-home order. The order will become effective March 21 and will remain in place until April 7 but could go longer.
- New York: Governor Cuomo issues a state-wide order that all non-essential workers must stay at home, noting that the number of coronavirus cases in the state has gone from zero on March 4 to over 2,900. The same day, Coronavirus cases in New York exceed 7000.
- Michigan: The state reports 225 new cases of coronavirus, bringing the total number of cases there to 549. A fourth death from coronavirus is reported, a man in his 50s from Oakland County who had underlying health conditions.
- North Carolina: The state activates North Carolina National Guard to assist in logistics and transportation of medical supplies, as the state reports it has 179 cases.
- Ohio: The state reported its first coronavirus death, Mark Wagoner Sr, a 76-year-old attorney from Lucas County in the Toledo area. The state had a total of 169 cases. Governor DeWine announces that senior centers and senior daycare centers will close.
- Tennessee: 15 recovery cases are confirmed in Nashville. However, the health department confirmed the state's first death of coronavirus.
- Texas: Dallas mega-church preacher Robert Jeffress agrees to move his Sunday services online.
- Virginia: Governor Northam activated Virginia National Guard. The state announced they have 114 cases of COVID-19, with 20 hospitalizations.

==== March 21 ====
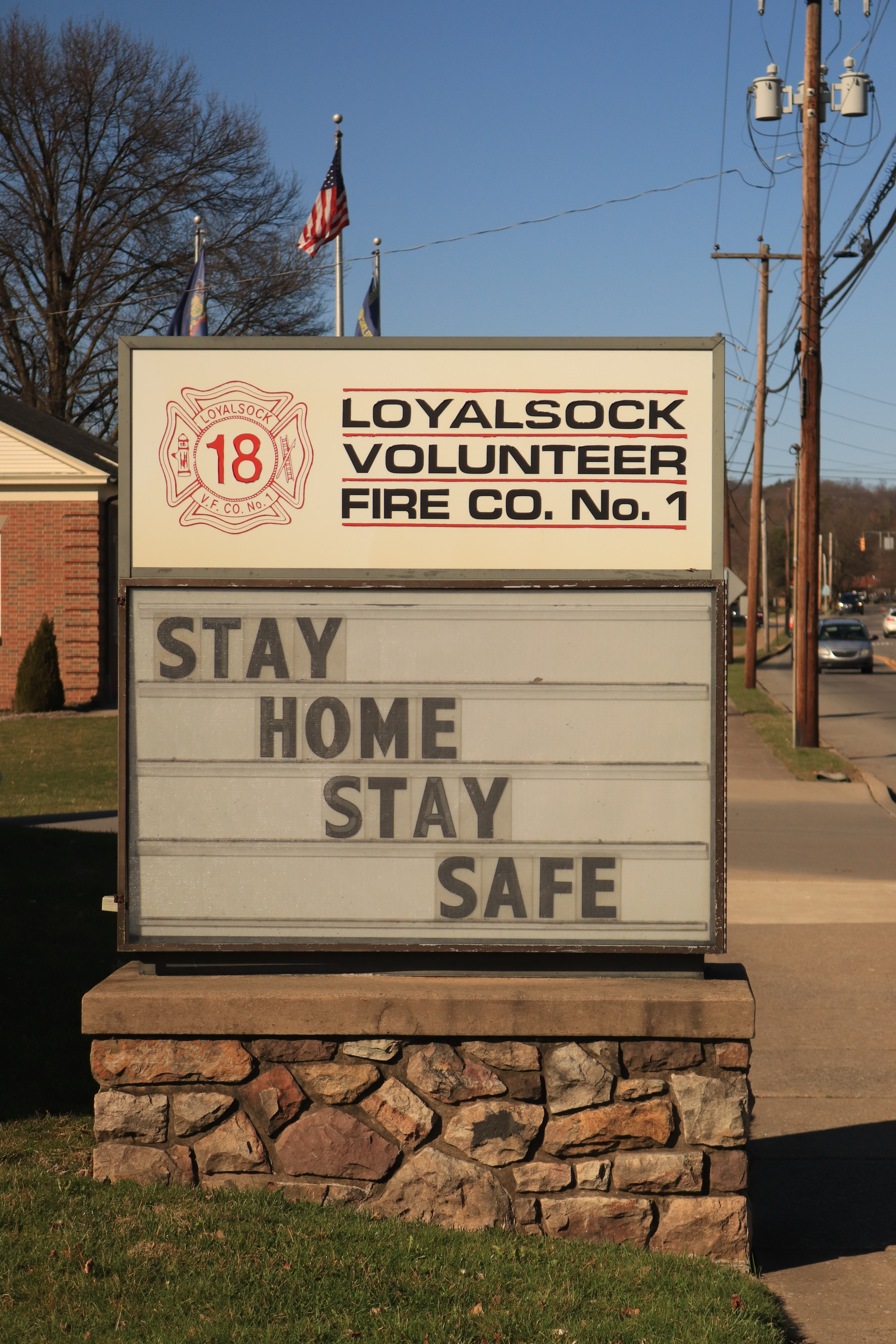

- Vice President Mike Pence and his wife test negative for COVID-19 infection.
- Florida: Governor DeSantis is considering a new strategy to put positive COVID-19 patients into isolation shelters such as abandoned convention centers and hotels instead of returning the patients to their home where they can infect their own family. Cases in Florida reached 763 presumptive positive cases.
- Michigan: Four more deaths from coronavirus are reported, bringing to total number of deaths in the state to eight. Also, the total number of cases of coronavirus in the state rises to 807.
- Minnesota: The state confirmed the first death due to the virus; the patient was from Ramsey County and was in their 80s. The patient had contracted the virus from a confirmed case.
- Ohio: The state has 247 confirmed cases of COVID-19. Facilities providing daycare and assistance for adults with developmental disabilities are closed unless they serve 10 people or less.
- North Carolina: Cases in the state increased to 273. Hospitals in the state begin restricting the visitors to the hospital.
- South Carolina: Governor McMaster orders local law enforcement to disperse crowds on state beaches. Cases in the state grow to 173.
- Tennessee: The state's second confirmed death due to the coronavirus occurred in Nashville. The man was the brother of Minnesota state Lieutenant Governor Peggy Flanagan.
- Virginia: The state reports it has confirmed 158 total cases in the state.

President Trump tweeted about potential coronavirus treatments, specifying Hydroxychloroquine and Azithromycin.

==== March 22 ====
Coronavirus deaths in the United States stand at 326.

- California: Governor Newsom states that testing should prioritize healthcare workers, hospitalized persons, senior citizens, persons with immune system issues, and other high-risk persons.
- New York: Health authorities recommend health facilities stop testing non-hospitalized patients, in part because of a shortage of PPE (Personal Protective Equipment) for health care workers. The state had announced initial tests will begin Tuesday, March 22 to see how effective three drugs are against COVID-19. The U.S. FDA (Food and Drug Administration) has shipped 70,000 doses of hydroxychloroquine, 10,000 of Zithromax, and 750,000 doses of chloroquine to the state.
- North Carolina: Mecklenburg County announced that they will cover one week cost of people staying in hotels and motels to keep the tenants from being evicted. The state also confirms a total of 306 cases, and reports that 6,438 tests have been conducted.
- Ohio: The Ohio Department of Health issues a stay at home order. All non-essential businesses are ordered closed until April 6, 2020. The state had 351 confirmed cases with 83 hospitalizations.
- Pennsylvania: Montgomery County officials announce the first known death from COVID-19 in that county. The statewide total of deaths related to COVID-19 is three.
- Washington: President Donald Trump also announces approval of Washington emergency declaration, and have instructed Federal assistance to be given to assist the local recovery efforts in fighting the coronavirus.
- West Virginia: Governor Justice urges West Virginians to stay home as much as possible. 12 cases of COVID-19 are detected in the state.
- Michigan: An additional death from coronavirus in the state is reported, an older man from Washtenaw County who had underlying medical conditions. The total number of deaths in the state is now nine. 258 new cases of coronavirus are reported in the state, bringing the total number of cases to 1,065.
- Virginia: Governor Northam announces that Virginia Schools are closed for the remainder of the 2019–2020 school year.

==== March 23 ====
- Michigan: Total number of cases reached 1,328 with 15 deaths. Governor Whitmer issued a stay-at-home order to go into effect at midnight on March 24 and last until April 13.
- Minnesota: The governor made several announcements regarding the state's response to the virus: a small business loan program would be made available for possibly 5000 businesses during the week for amounts between $2,500 and $35,000, all elective veterinary surgeries would be halted and that he would be revising the budget for the response to the virus asking for an additional $365 million. The state had 235 positive total confirmed cases and 1 death. The governor had also quarantined himself after a member of his security team tested positive for the virus. He claimed to be experiencing no symptoms. Senator Amy Klobuchar's husband was hospitalized due to the coronavirus.
- Ohio: 442 people in the state have tested positive for COVID-19. 104 people have been hospitalized and six people have died due to the illness. Governor DeWine institutes a hiring freeze for all state government positions, except those involved in fighting the virus, and a freeze on contract services. The stay at home order signed on March 22 goes into effect at 11:59 pm.
- Oregon: Governor Brown issues a stay at home order, "to the maximum extent possible", except for when carrying out essential tasks like getting groceries, refueling their vehicles, or obtaining health care.
- Diamond Comic Distributors announce they are no longer accepting new stock or distributing new comics until further notice. Because they're the exclusive distributor, that means all comic books would have to postpone publication of future issues after the titles released on March 25.
- New Mexico's Governor Lujan-Grisham closes all non-essential businesses statewide effective March 24.

WHO Director-General Tedros said, "Using untested medicines without the right evidence could raise false hope and do more harm than good." He also described the pandemic as "accelerating".

The Justice department created a price gouging and hoarding task force to investigate and prosecute scams and other crimes related to the pandemic.

==== March 24 ====
- Minnesota: The state announces a total of 262 confirmed cases in the state. Twenty-two of those cases require hospitalization and there is 1 confirmed death. There are 15 people hospitalized and 88 patients who had required isolation no longer do.
- Ohio: The state has 564 confirmed COVID-19 cases: 145 hospitalizations and 8 deaths.
- Rhode Island: Governor Gina Raimondo announces that there are 124 confirmed cases. She claims that "many, many" have recovered.
- South Carolina: Governor McMaster announces that K–12 schools statewide will remain closed through the month of April.

Three U.S. Army hospital units were deployed to New York and Washington State. The Army Corps of Engineers and the National Guard have under construction four hospitals and four medical centers in New York. FEMA sent New York 2,000 ventilators.

==== March 25 ====
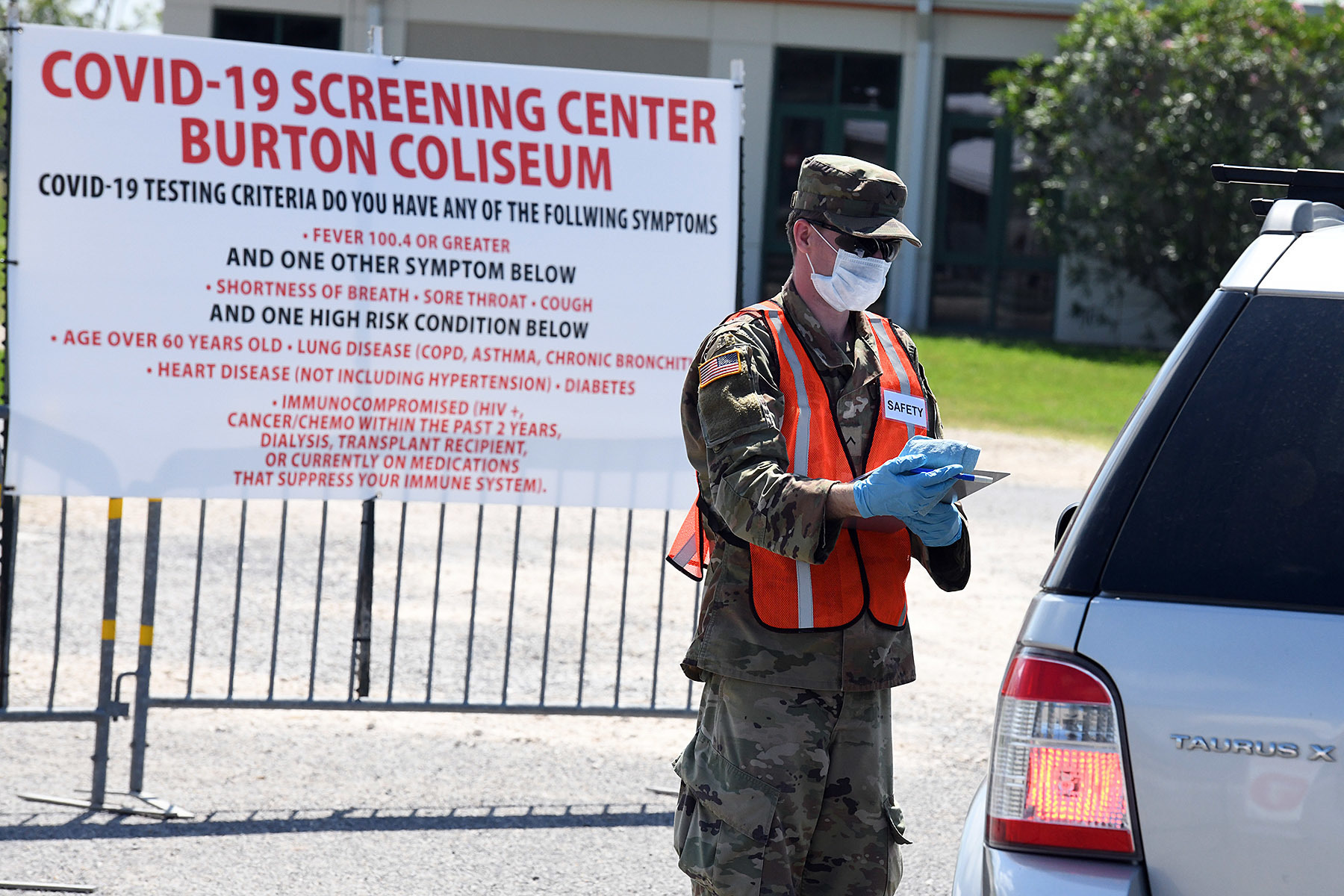
Testing site at Burton Coliseum in Lake Charles, Louisiana

Senate Republicans and Democrats strike a deal on a version of the stimulus bill which includes: providing $1,200 to most adults (phased out for persons making from $75,000 to $99,000 a year), $600 a week unemployment benefits (approximately $2,400 a month) on top of state unemployment benefits and to last potentially for four months and including freelancers and other workers in the "gig economy", and $500 billion for businesses and municipalities. This last part is to be overseen by an inspector general in the Treasury Department and a Congressional Oversight panel.

- Alaska: Governor Dunleavy orders everyone arriving in Alaska to self-quarantine for 14 days upon arrival, effective March 25, with limited exceptions.
- Ohio. As of 2:00 pm, there are 704 confirmed cases of COVID-19, with 182 resulting in hospitalization (including 75 ICU admissions). Ten people have died from the virus. Though 704 cases have been confirmed in the state, the actual number of cases is believed to be much higher. The Ohio General Assembly passes House Bill 197, which does many things, such as extending primary voting to April 28 and banning water utilities from disconnecting service.

==== March 26 ====
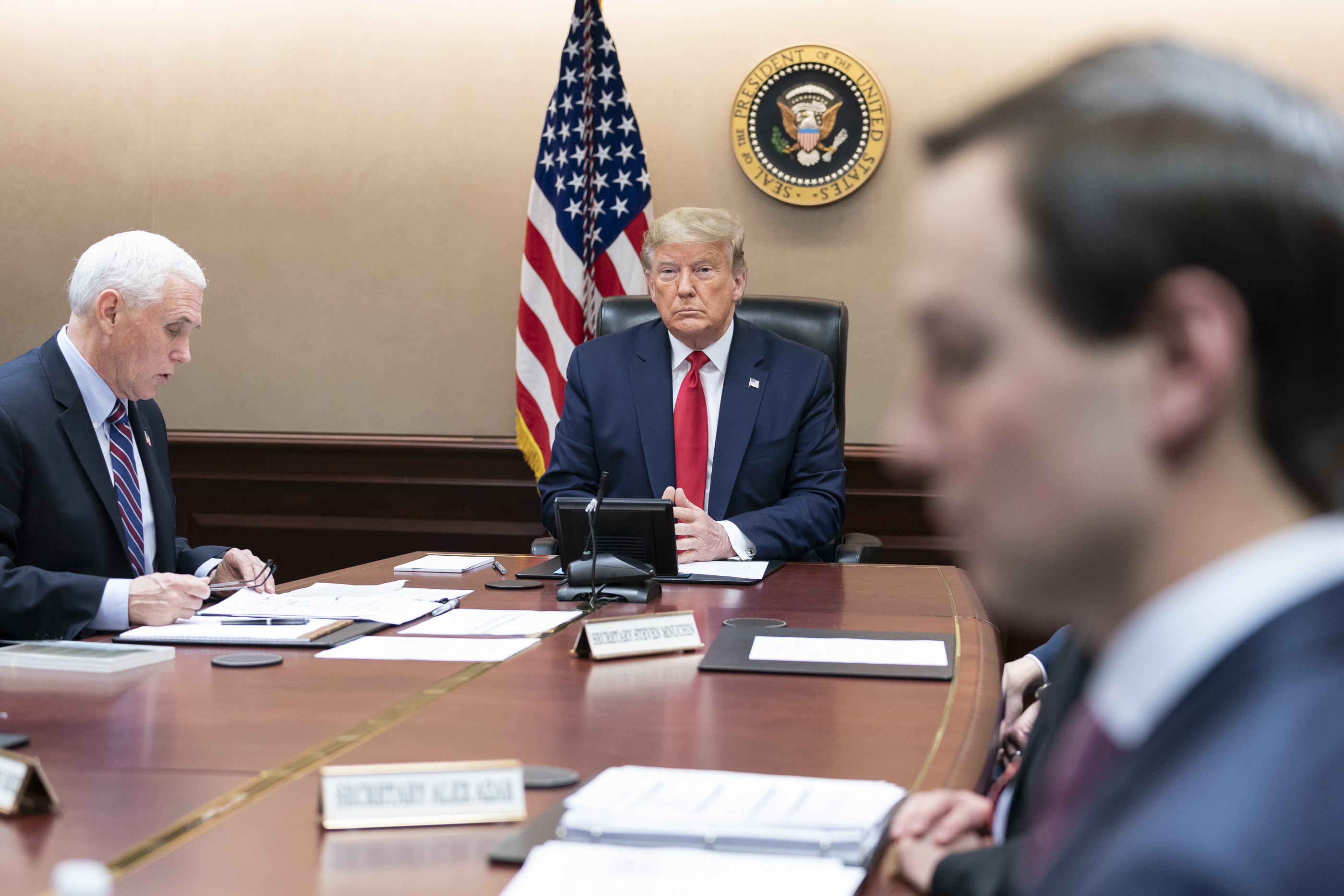
White House conference call with state governors

- United States: the total number of reported confirmed cases in the United States surpasses that of China with over 85,000, making it the country with the highest number of coronavirus patients in the world.
- Ohio: Ohio has 867 confirmed COVID-19 cases, with 223 of those cases resulting in hospitalization and 15 resulting in death.
- Pennsylvania. The state had 1,687 confirmed cases.
- New York: President Trump announces that USNS Comfort will be heading to New York City to assist local hospitals. The ship is scheduled to depart on March 28 and scheduled to arrive in New York City on March 30. Governor Cuomo announces the state will allow two patients to share one ventilator.

==== March 27 ====
- Ohio: 1,137 people in Ohio have the virus, with 276 needing hospitalization. 19 COVID-19 patients have died. Governor DeWine signs House Bill 197, which extends the primary election through April 28, bans water disconnections, waives standardized testing requirements for public schools, and extends the state income tax filing and payment deadline to July 15.
- Colorado: The 8:00 pm Denver Howl is started by people in a neighborhood near the now closed Denver Botanic Gardens and Denver Zoo.

A survey of more than forty leading economists by the University of Chicago published on March 27 indicated that prematurely ending lockdowns (e.g., business closures) would do more economic harm than good. Specifically, none of the economists surveyed disagreed with the statement that: "Abandoning severe lockdowns at a time when the likelihood of a resurgence in infections remains high will lead to greater total economic damage than sustaining the lockdowns to eliminate the resurgence risk."

President Trump signs the Coronavirus Aid, Relief, and Economic Security Act into law on March 27.

==== March 28 ====
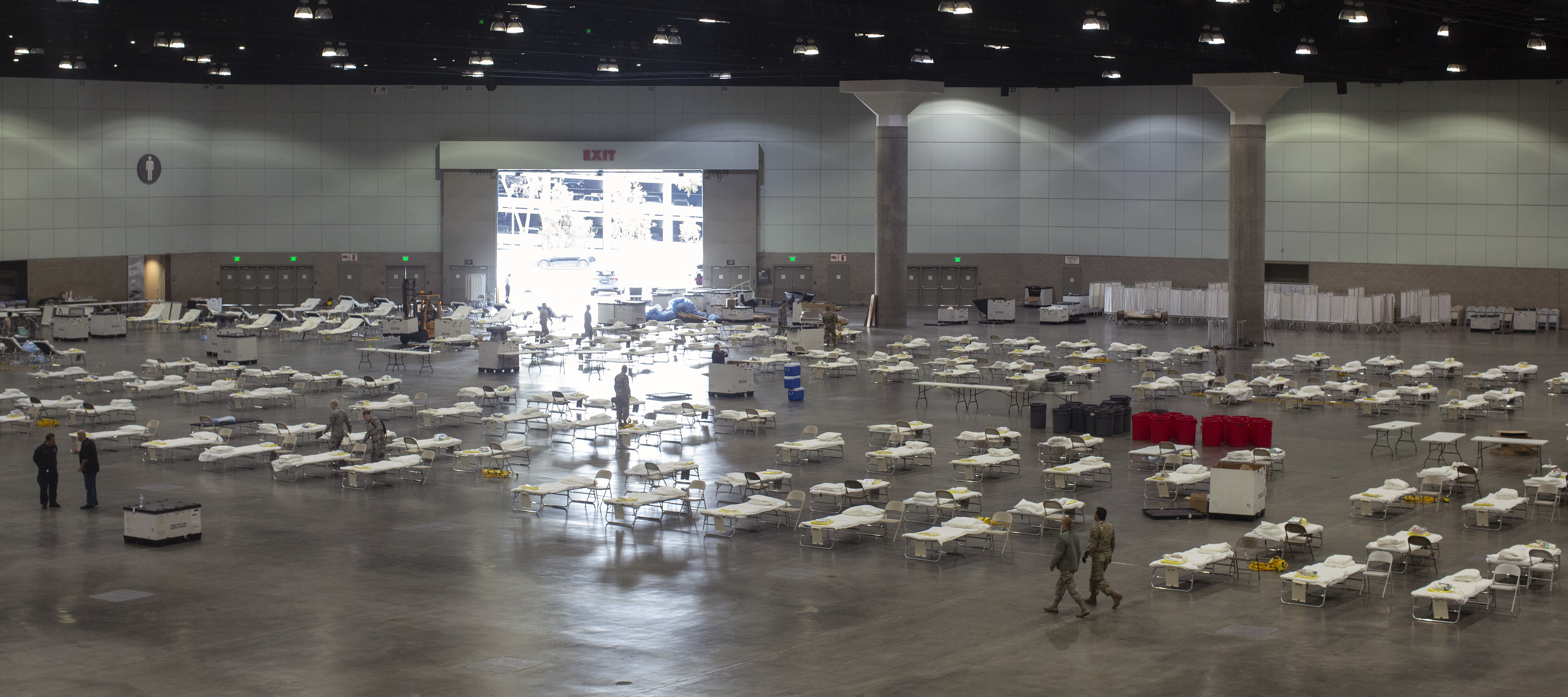
Hospital beds in the Los Angeles Convention Center

- Michigan: President Donald Trump approves the state's disaster declaration. Meanwhile, the state's total cases of coronavirus increased to 4,658 while the death toll climbed to 111.
- Ohio: According to the Ohio Department of Health, the state has 1,406 cases of COVID-19, 344 of which resulted in hospitalization and 25 of which resulted in death. Ohio Department of Health director Amy Acton reports that the virus's peak is expected in mid-May and that during that peak, there could be up to 10,000 cases a day. Governor DeWine asks the FDA to issue an emergency waiver for the use of new technology that can sterilize face masks.

==== March 29 ====
The White House extended the President's Coronavirus Guidelines for America from the CDC: "30 Days to Slow the Spread of Coronavirus" as an extension of the previous "15 Days" guidelines which were issued on March 16.

- Admiral Brett Giroir of the United States Public Health Service reports, at the President's Sunday press conference, that total testing for the virus in the U.S. is 894,000.
- Michigan: State Representative Isaac Robinson passes away of suspected coronavirus at the age of 44. Meanwhile, the state's total number of coronavirus cases increases to 5,524 with 132 deaths.
- Ohio: The state has 1,653 cases with 403 hospitalizations including 139 ICU admissions, and 29 deaths.

==== March 30 ====
- Ohio: Ohio has 1,933 cases of COVID-19, including 475 that resulted in hospitalization and 39 that resulted in death. Governor DeWine extends the closure of schools to May 1.

==== March 31 ====
- Georgia: Georgia Governor Brian Kemp suspends in class instruction for all Georgia public schools for the remainder of the 2019–2020 school year. Students will continue their education through online formats.
- Ohio: Ohio has 2,199 cases; 585 resulted in hospitalization and 55 resulted in death. Governor DeWine announces an order requiring that organizations with ventilators or similar devices report them to the state. President Trump approves the state's Disaster Declaration.

==== Status at end of March ====
As of March 31, Our World in Data reported there were 3,170 deaths, 164,620 confirmed cases, and 1.07 million tests completed in the U.S.

The NYT reported on March 28 that despite significant improvement in testing capacity in the U.S., "hospitals and clinics across the country still must deny tests to those with milder symptoms, trying to save them for the most serious cases, and they often must wait a week for results." Mr. Trump asked the South Korean president for as many kits as possible from the 100,000 produced daily there. However, "having the ability to diagnose the disease three months after it was first disclosed by China does little to address why the United States was unable to do so sooner, when it might have helped reduce the toll of the pandemic." One expert indicated the delay of testing adversely impacted other aspects of the coronavirus response. Vox reported that during the week of March 25 to April 1, the U.S. was "performing about 110,000 tests per day". Several experts estimated that between 500,000 and "millions" of tests per day are necessary. There are many challenges to ramping up capacity: "Complaints vary, but labs say they don't have enough swabs, test kits, reagents, personal protective equipment (PPE), staff, or machines to run the specific tests required." Money and regulations are also challenges.

=== April ===
==== April 1 ====
- Ohio: There are 2,547 confirmed cases. 679 people have been hospitalized and 65 have died. Governor DeWine announced during his daily press conference that there is a new method to divide the state into hospital capacity regions.

==== April 2 ====
Video of burials on Hart Island, New York City

- Indiana: Superintendent of Public Instruction Jennifer McCormick directs that Indiana schools will close for the rest of the academic year, and continue providing instruction remotely.
- Michigan: Governor Whitmer officially closes schools in the state for the rest of the 2019–20 school year. Meanwhile, total cases of coronavirus in the state increase to 10,791 with a death toll of 417.
- Ohio: There are 2,902 confirmed cases with 802 of them leading to hospitalization and 81 leading to death. Governor Dewine extends the state's stay at home order through May 1 with new restrictions: campgrounds must close, all retail businesses must post signs limiting how many people are allowed in at one time, and wedding receptions are limited to 10 people. The order also establishes a state board to evaluate what is and is not an essential business.

==== April 3 ====
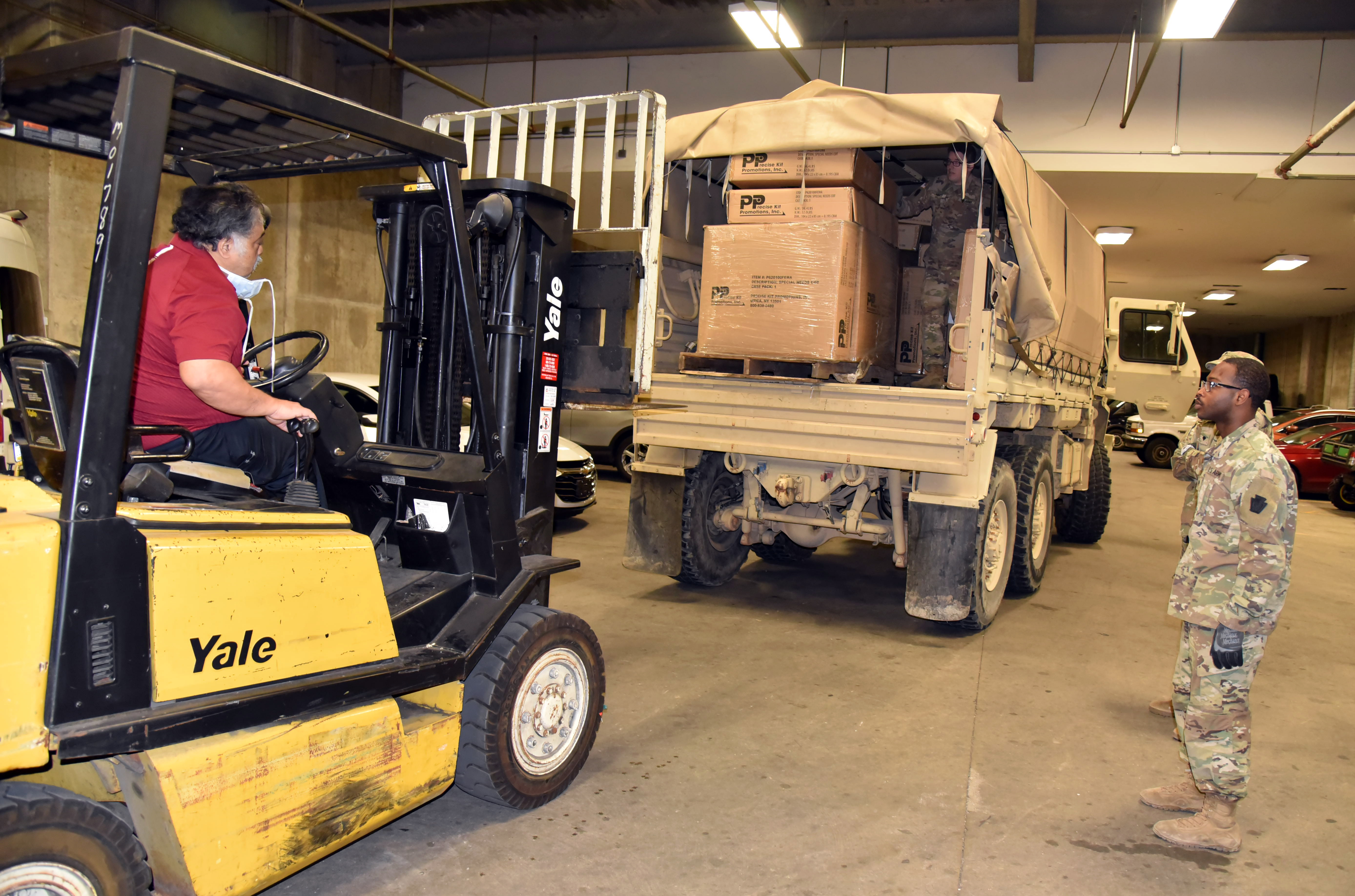
Pennsylvania National Guardsmen at a FEMA field hospital at Temple University

- Indiana: Governor Eric Holcomb announces a two-week extension of Indiana's stay-at-home order. The new order will run through April 20.
- Michigan: 1,953 new cases of coronavirus are reported, bringing the total number in the state to 12,744 with a death toll of 479.
- Ohio: The state has 3,312 confirmed cases with 895 of them leading to hospitalization and 91 leading to death.

==== April 4 ====
- Alabama: Governor Kay Ivey announces a stay-at-home order through April 30. Attorney General Steve Marshall said the order can be enforced criminally, but he said he hopes it will not come to that. Disobeying the order is a Class C misdemeanor that can carry a $500 penalty.
- Ohio: There are 3,739 total cases including 1,006 that resulted in hospitalization and 102 that resulted in death. Governor DeWine signs an executive order removing training requirements for mental health and marriage counselors to make telehealth visits more easily accessible.

==== April 5 ====
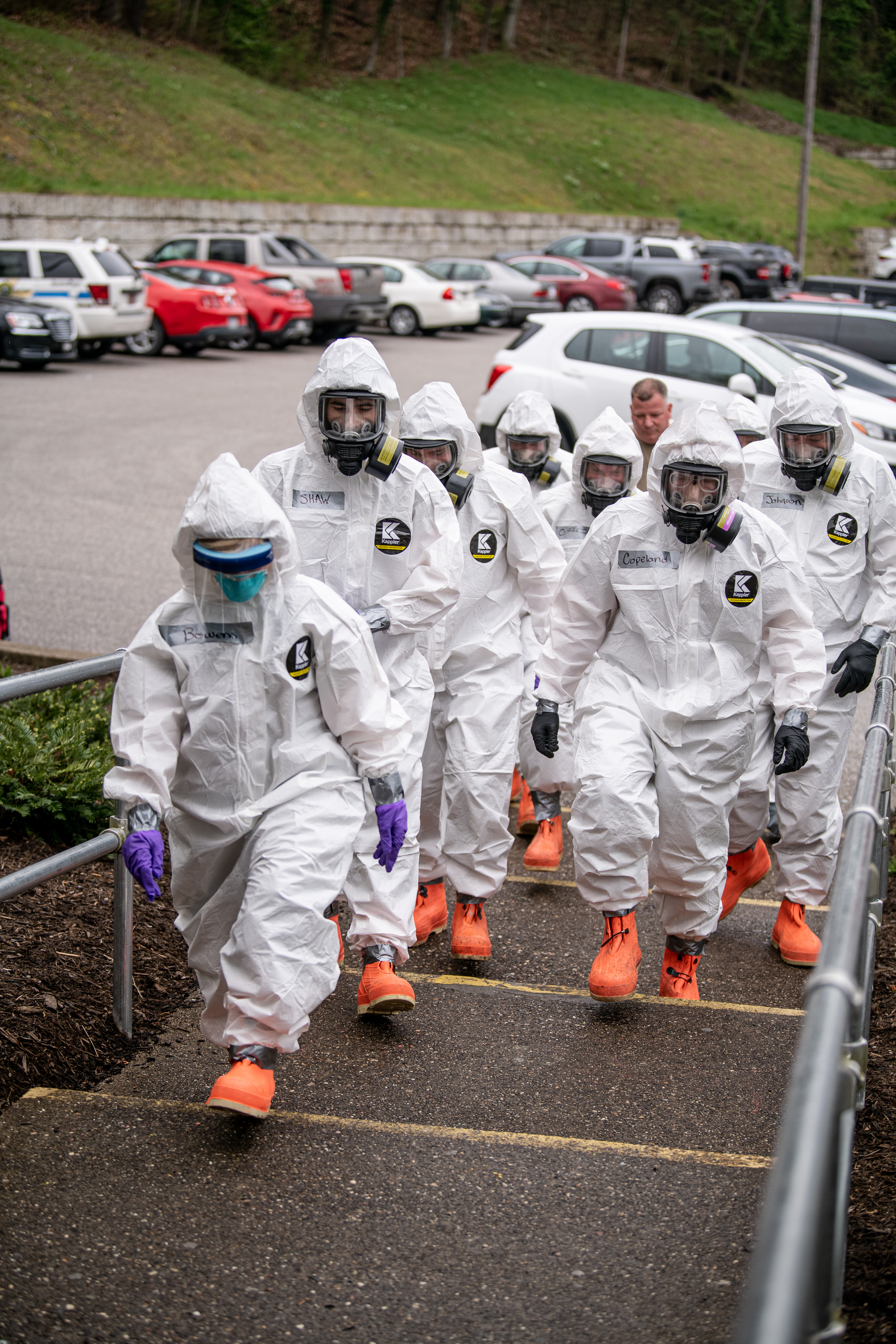
West Virginia National Guard at a nursing home

- Ohio: There are 4,043 confirmed cases.
- Pennsylvania: The state has 11,510 cases. 1,072 lead to hospitalization and 150 lead to death.

==== April 6 ====
- Indiana: The state's number of coronavirus cases increases to 4,944 with 139 deaths.
- Ohio: The number of cases surpasses 4,400. Governor DeWine names six facilities that will be converted into health care facilities if necessary.

==== April 7 ====
- Michigan: The state legislature votes to extend Michigan's emergency declaration to April 30. Meanwhile, the total number of cases of coronavirus in the state increases to 18,970 with a death toll of 845.
- South Carolina: Governor McMaster issues a "home or work" order. The death toll surpasses 50.

President Trump alleges that the WHO mishandled the pandemic. He questioned why the WHO had recommended "keeping our borders open to China early on", advice he rejected. He mentioned the WHO was funded largely by the U.S., but was very "China-centric".

==== April 8 ====
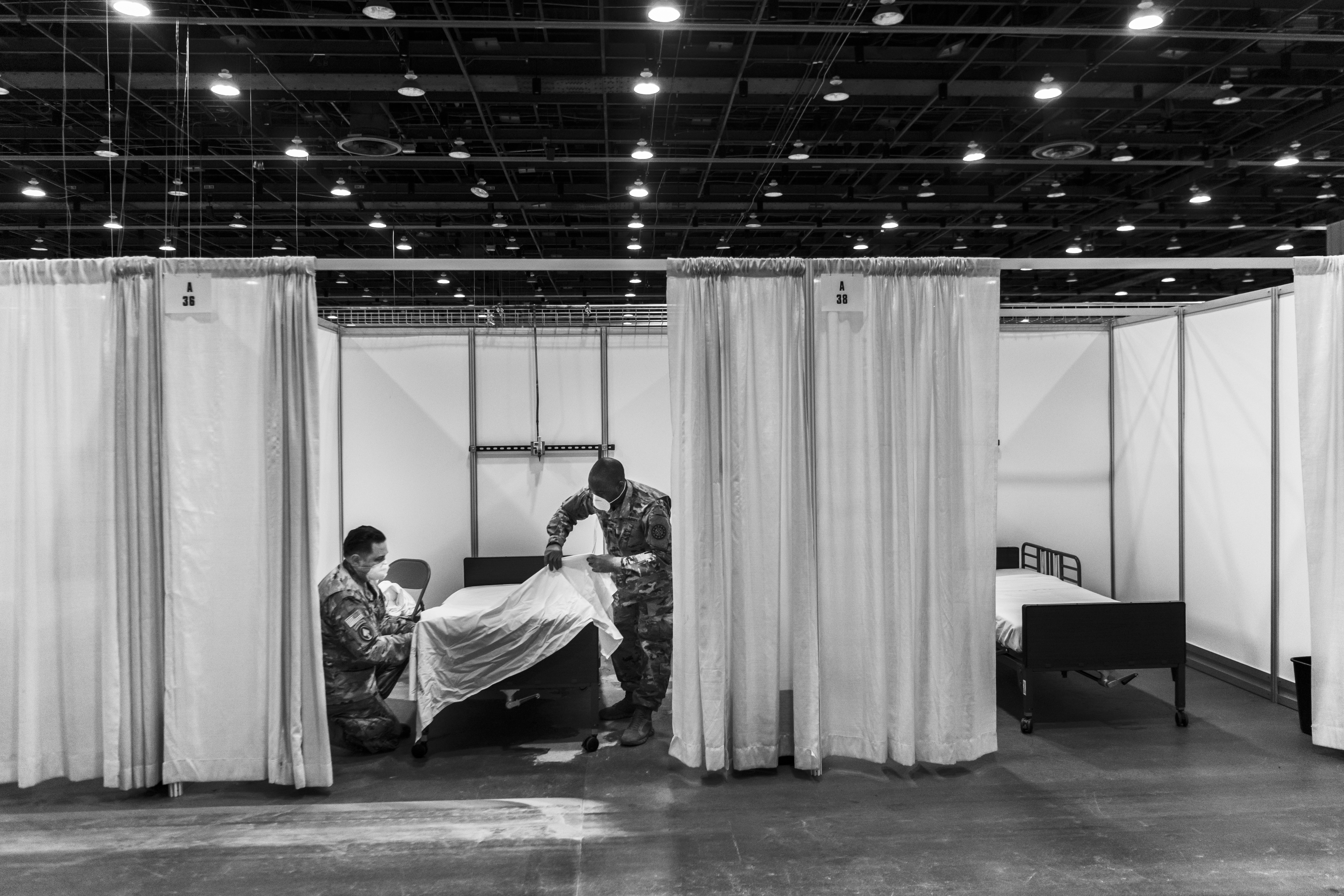
Temporary hospital in the TCF Center in Detroit, Michigan

- Georgia: Governor Brian Kemp extends the statewide shelter in place order through the end of April.
- Minnesota: Governor Walz extends Minnesota's stay at home order until May 4.
- Ohio: The number of cases increases to 5,148. Apple CEO Tim Cook donates 100,000 N95 masks to Ohio health care workers.

==== April 9 ====
- Indiana: The state's expire on the 14th. Meanwhile, the total number of cases in the state climbs to 21,504 with a death toll of 1,076.
- Missouri: Governor Parson orders all Missouri public, private, and charter schools to be closed for in-person instruction for the rest of the school year.
- Ohio: The state has more than 5,500 confirmed cases and more than 200 deaths. During Governor DeWine's daily press conference, about 75 people gather outside to protest the state's restrictions.

==== April 10 ====
- USA: The 8:00 pm Howl is now sweeping the nation, reports Associated Press. It was started in a Denver neighborhood on March 27.
- Michigan: The field hospital at the TCF Center in downtown Detroit begins accepting COVID-19 patients. Meanwhile, the total number of cases of coronavirus in the state reach 22,783 with a death toll of 1,281. This represents the largest increase in deaths (205) since the outbreak began in the state.
- Ohio: Governor DeWine announces an emergency amendment to Ohio Department of Medicaid's provider agreement. The new changes are intended to remove barriers to health care and reduce burdens on hospitals and providers. The Food and Drug Administration (FDA) grants STERIS, an Ohio-based company, a temporary Emergency Use Authorization for decontaminating compatible N95 and N95-equivalent respirators. The Ohio Bureau of Workers' Compensation Board of Directors approves a plan to send up to $1.6 billion to Ohio employers in spring of 2020.

==== April 12 ====
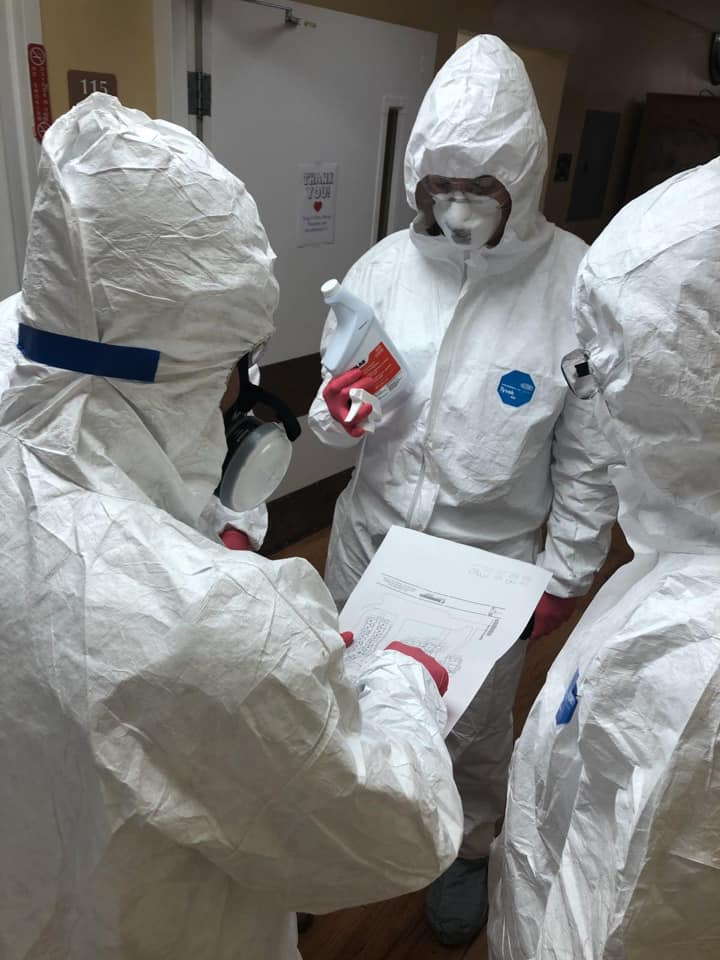
Disinfecting a nursing home in Plains, Georgia

- Indiana: The total number of cases of coronavirus in the state increases to 7,928 with 343 deaths.

==== April 13 ====
- Ohio: Nursing homes are now required to inform families of cases within 24 hours. Liquor sales are now limited to state residents only in the counties of Ashtabula, Trumbull, Mahoning, Columbiana, Jefferson, and Belmont. Protesters again gathered outside the statehouse during Governor DeWine's press conference.

==== April 14 ====
AP reported that: "Dr. Anthony Fauci, the government's top infectious disease expert, said Tuesday that the U.S. does not yet have the critical testing and tracing procedures needed to begin reopening the nation's economy ... Fauci said that a May 1 target is 'a bit overly optimistic' for many areas of the country. Any easing off the strict social-distancing rules in place in much of the country would have to occur on a rolling basis, not all at once."

President Trump announced his decision to halt U.S. funding to the WHO, alleging the U.S. would review alleged mismanagement and cover-up efforts. WHO officials disputed his allegations the following day, saying that: a) the world was alerted January 5; b) countries globally began to respond January 6; and c) WHO provided updates throughout the period.

- Indiana: The total number of cases of coronavirus in the state increases to 8,527 with 387 deaths.
- Ohio: There are 7,280 cases of COVID-19, including 2,156 that resulted in hospitalizations and 324 that resulted in death. Governor DeWine announces that his administration is seeking a Medicaid waiver from the federal government to remove certain healthcare restrictions. A hundred people protest outside the Statehouse during his press conference.

==== April 15 ====
- Michigan: A large scale rally called "Operation Gridlock" takes place in Lansing to protest Governor Whitmer's stay-at-home order. Meanwhile, the total number of cases of coronavirus in the state increases to 28,059 with a death toll of 1,921.
- Ohio: Governor DeWine announces that he has asked the Ohio Hospital Association to begin developing a plan to start treating people whose non-COVID-19 elective procedures were deferred or delayed. He also announces that Ohio's partnership with the Battelle Memorial Institute is expanding. This will allow the institute to extend their sterilization services to EMS providers and law enforcement agencies.

==== April 16 ====
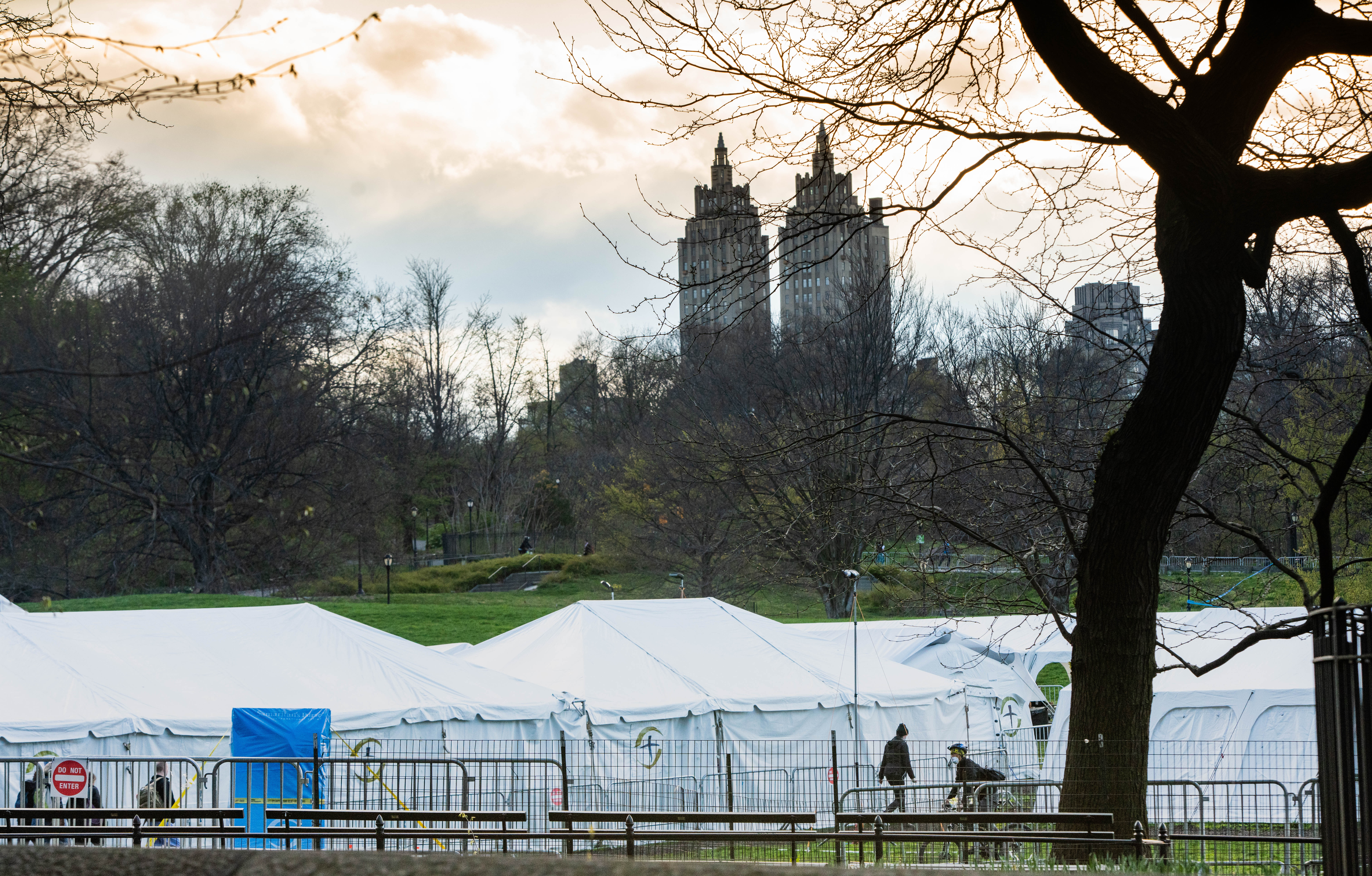
Temporary hospital in Central Park, New York City

- The Trump administration unveils new federal guidelines outlining a three-phased approach to gradually restoring normal commerce and services, with each phase lasting at least 14 days, but only for places with strong testing and seeing a decrease in COVID-19 cases.
- Ohio: The state has 8,414 confirmed and probable cases. Governor DeWine announces that he will work closely with the Governors of Illinois, Indiana, Kentucky, Michigan, Minnesota, and Wisconsin to reopen the region's economy in a coordinated way.

As of April 16, there were 639,664 confirmed coronavirus cases in the U.S., with 30,985 confirmed deaths, a 4.8% mortality rate. An estimated 3.24 million tests had been conducted, indicating about 20% of those tested had coronavirus.

==== April 17 ====
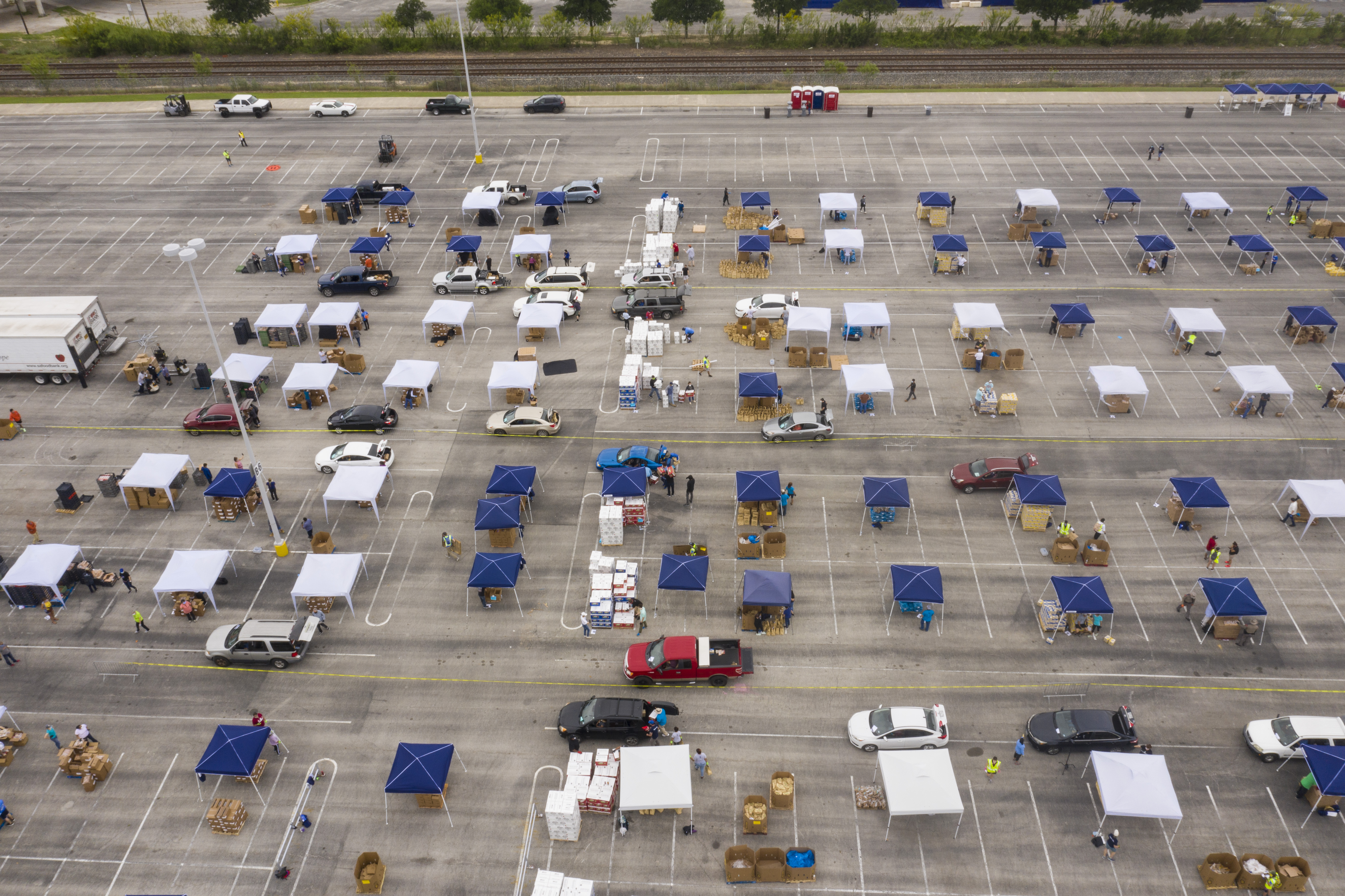
Socially-distanced food bank distribution site in San Antonio, Texas

- Indiana: For the first time, the total number of cases of coronavirus in the state surpasses 10,000 (10,154) with the death toll increasing to 519. Also Governor Holcomb extends the stay-at-home order until May 1.
- Michigan: Detroit mayor Mike Duggan announces that all essential workers in the city, regardless of whether they exhibit symptoms or not, are now eligible to be tested for COVID-19. Meanwhile, the total number of cases of coronavirus in the state increases to 30,023 with a death toll of 2,227.
- Ohio: The state has 9,107 confirmed and probable cases and 418 confirmed and probable deaths.
- Texas: Governor Greg Abbott announced a phased reopening of Texas' economy beginning April 20.

==== April 18 ====
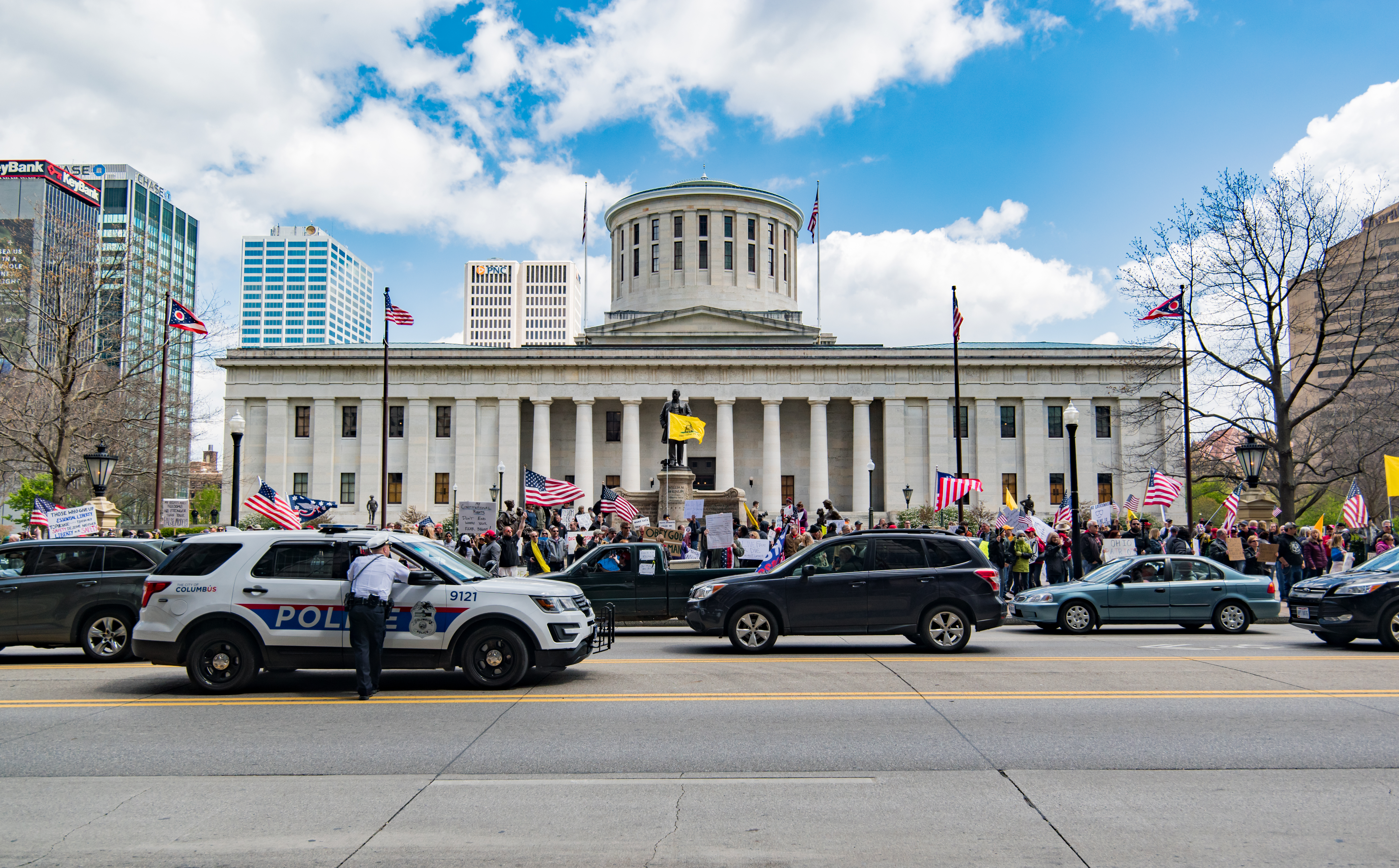
Protesting the shutdown and business closures at the Ohio Statehouse on April 18

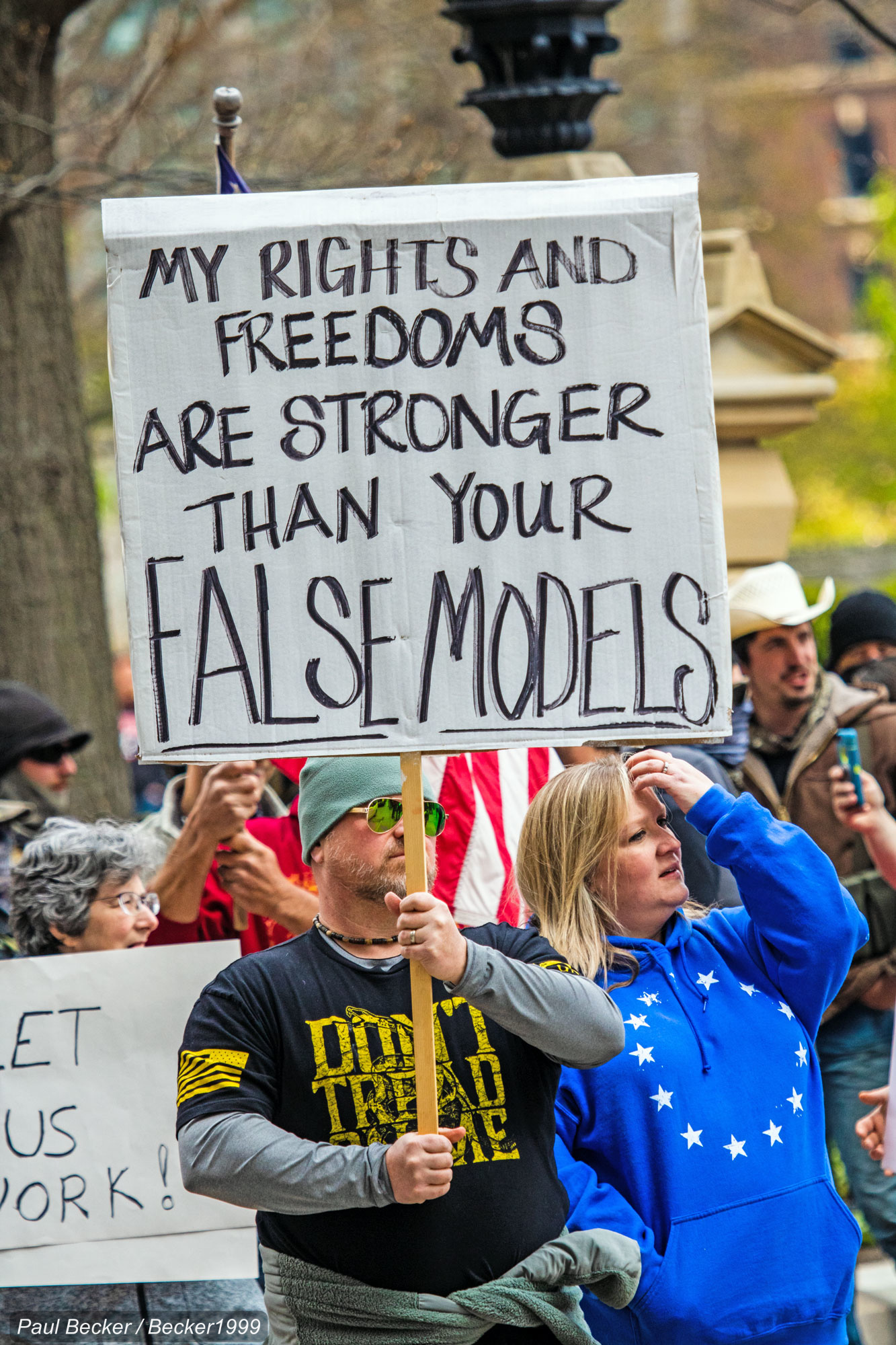

- Indiana: Dozens protest outside of the Governor's mansion in Indianapolis after the issue of the latest stay-at-home order.

==== April 20 ====
- Ohio: Governor DeWine announces that Ohio's K–12 schools would remain closed for the remainder of the academic year. Hundreds of protesters again gather at the Ohio Statehouse during his press conference.
- In reiterating his earlier statements on Tucker Carlson Tonight, Texas Lieutenant Governor Dan Patrick (politician) tells Carlson, "... there are more important things than living" as a justification for the state moving ahead with reopening businesses in the coming days despite the coronavirus outbreak.

==== April 21 ====
- Georgia: Governor Kemp announced on April 20 that many businesses could reopen on April 24, including "gyms, hair salons, bowling alleys and tattoo parlors", with restaurants and movie theaters allowed to reopen on April 27. This move has brought widespread condemnation from inside and outside Georgia, with Atlanta Mayor Keisha Lance Bottoms saying she will "continue to ask Atlantans to please stay at home" and Stacey Abrams, the 2018 Democratic candidate for governor, calling reopening "dangerously incompetent. The Institute for Health Metrics and Evaluation's April 21 prediction lists the earliest safe date for Georgia to shift from social distancing measures as June 19. As of April 21, the state had more than 20,000 confirmed cases.

==== April 22 ====
- Ohio: 14,117 people have tested positive for COVID-19. 610 have died and 2,882 have been hospitalized. The Ohio Department of Health establishes a tier system to prioritize testing.

==== April 23 ====
- Ohio: DeWine shares additional details on how the state will re-open. Phase one of the re-opening will begin on May 1.

==== April 24 ====
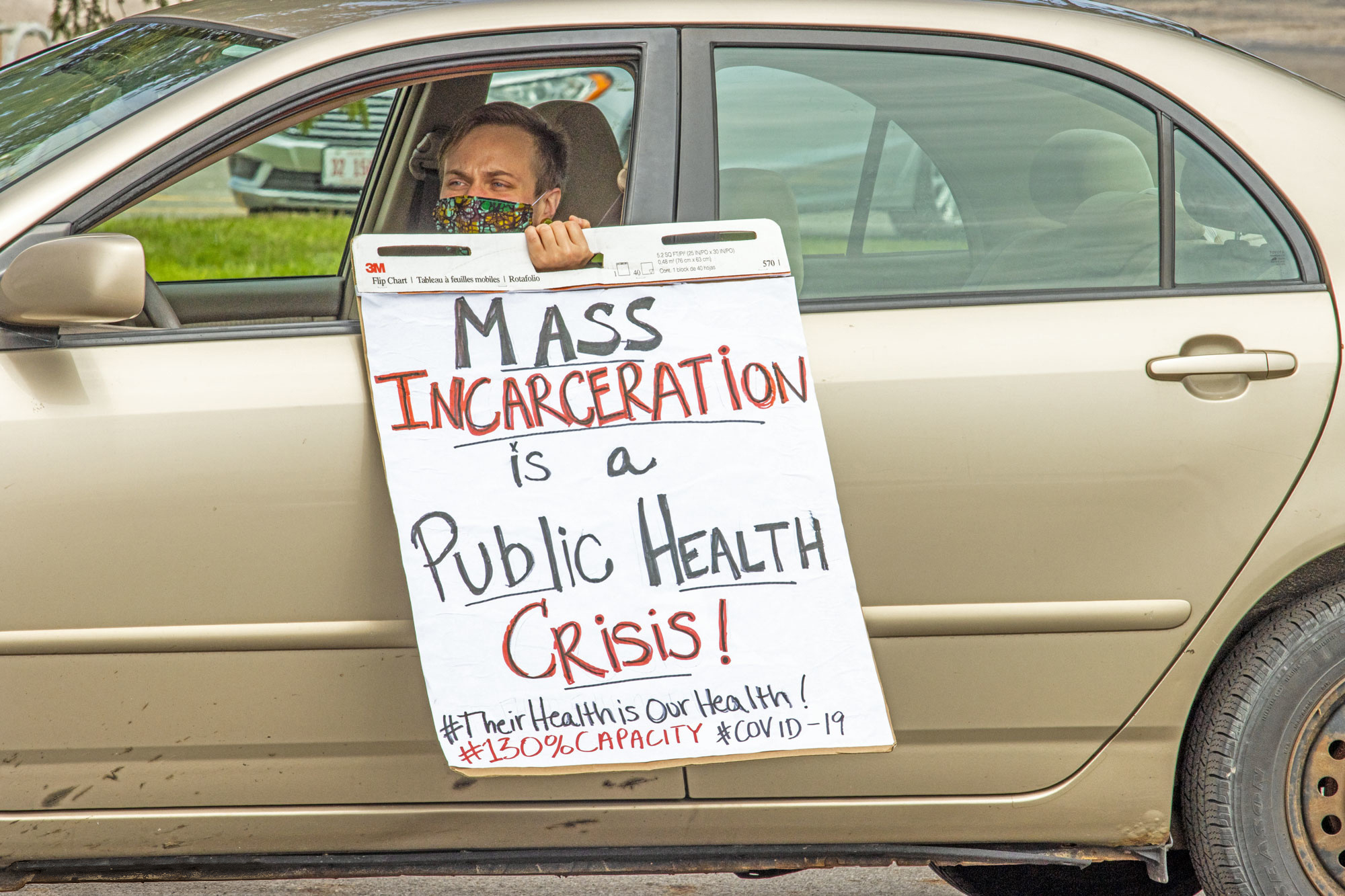

- Alaska: Restaurants were allowed to open using only 25 percent of capacity and with tables at least 10 feet apart.
- Georgia: Barber shops cut hair with face masks and latex gloves in place. Beauty salons asked customers to sign legal waivers before coloring hair.
- Indiana: The total number of cases of coronavirus in the state reaches 13,680 with the death toll increasing to 741. The number of cases have gone up three days in a row.
- Michigan: Governor Whitmer extends the state's stay-at-home order to May 15 while loosening some restrictions. Meanwhile, the total number of cases in the state increases to 36,641 with a death toll of 3,085.
- Ohio: The state has 15,169 reported COVID-19 cases.

==== April 25 ====
- Ohio: There are 15,587 cases, 711 of which resulted in death.

==== April 27 ====
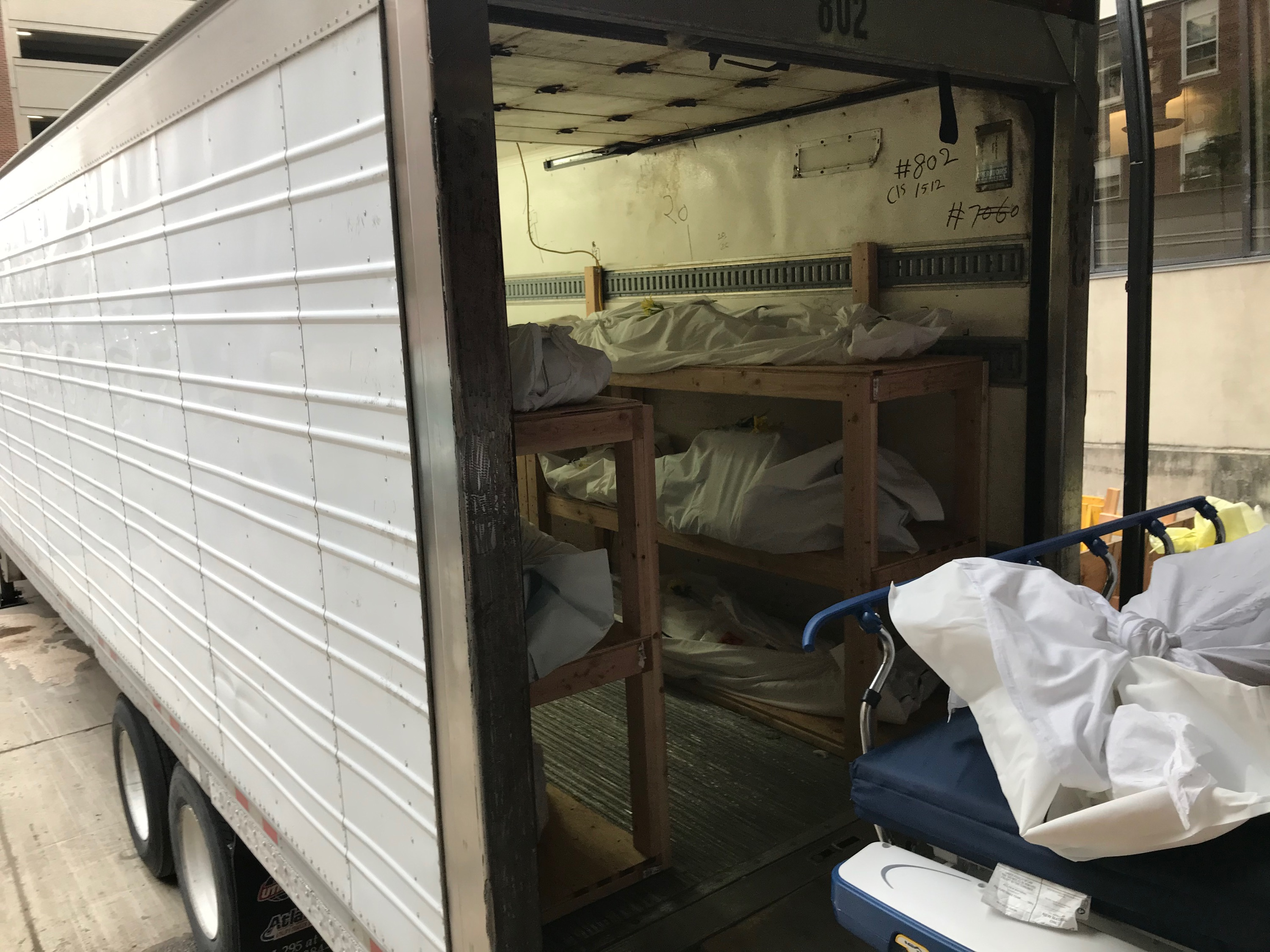
Bodies in a refrigerator truck in Hackensack, New Jersey

- Michigan: Governor Whitmer unveils her plan to reopen the state's economy, called the MI Safe Start Plan, which calls for workplaces with the least risk of virus transmission to be the first to reopen. Meanwhile, the total number of cases of coronavirus in the state increases to 38,210 with a death toll of 3,407.
- Ohio: All businesses are required to enforce mandatory facial covering for employees and customers and limited to no more than 50% of their spaces' fire code occupancy. The state also announces that on May 1 all nonessential medical procedures can resume, and veterinarians and dentists can reopen. Manufacturing and construction can resume May 4, and all non essential retail may reopen May 12.

==== April 30 ====
- Michigan: Governor Whitmer extends the state's emergency declaration through May 28. Meanwhile, the total number of cases of coronavirus in the state increases to 41,379 with a death toll of 3,789.
- Ohio: The total number of cases is 18,027. Governor DeWine announces in his press conference that he will extend the stay-at-home order, though he does not give a specific date. The Ohio Department of Health's website says the extension will last until May 29.

==== Status at end of April ====
As of April 30, Our World in Data reported that for the U.S. there were 60,966 total deaths, 1.04 million confirmed cases, and 6.25 million tests completed. The U.S. averaged about 145,200 tests per day between April 1 and April 15 and 199,000 per day from April 16 to April 30.

=== May ===
==== May 1 ====
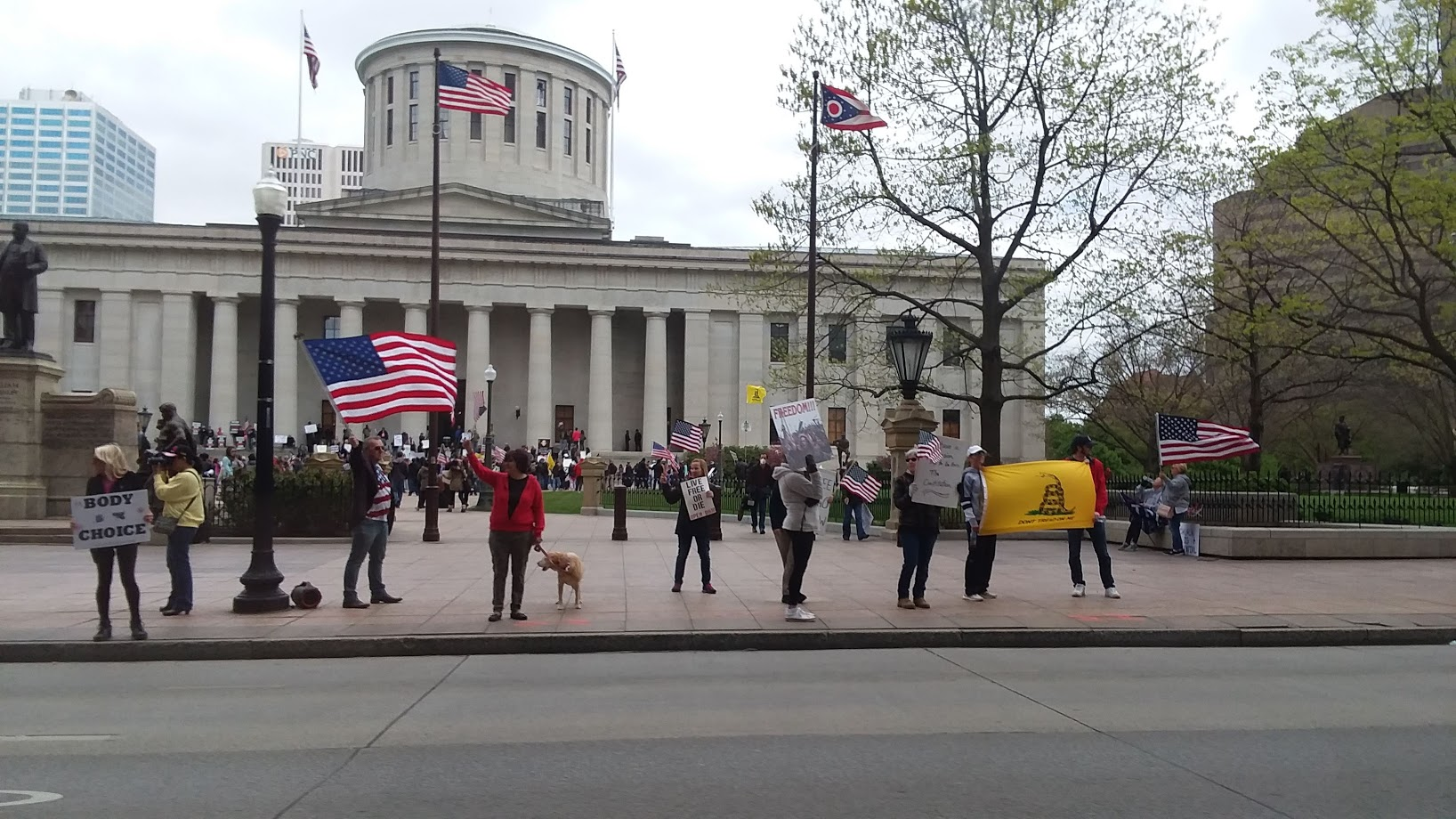
Protesters in front of the Ohio Statehouse on May 1, 2020

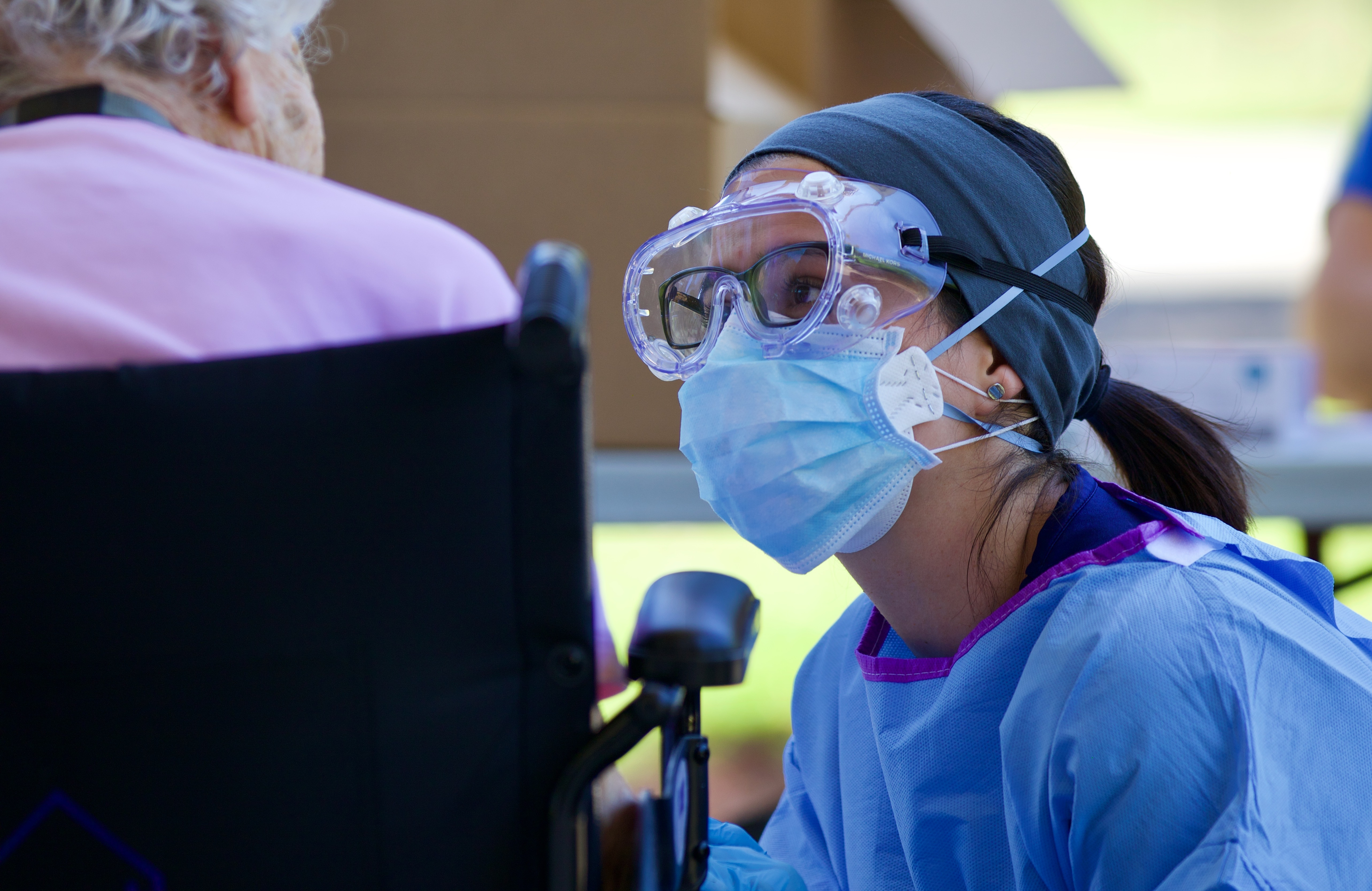
Testing at a nursing home in northeast Florida

- Indiana: The total number of cases of coronavirus in the state reaches 18,630 with the death toll increasing to 1,175. Despite one of the largest increases the state has had in a day, Governor Holcomb ends the stay-at-home order and institutes a five-stage plan for getting Indiana "back on track". Holcomb says he hopes Indiana can completely be back to normal on July 4.
- Ohio: A "Stay Healthy and Safe at Home" order replaces the previous stay-at-home order. Starting May 1, medical procedures that do not require an overnight stay in a hospital can proceed. Another large protest occurs during Governor Dewine's press conference.
- Michigan: Governor Whitmer signs an executive order to resume residential and commercial construction, and well as real estate activities beginning May 7. Meanwhile, the total number of cases of coronavirus in the state increases to 42,356 with a death toll of 3,866.

==== May 2 ====
- Ohio: There are 19,335 reported cases. Protests at the statehouse continued.

==== May 3 ====
- Ohio: There are 19,914 total cases with 1,038 deaths.
- Michigan: The total number of cases of coronavirus in the state increases to 43,754 with a death toll of 4,049. This represents the smallest increase in deaths (29) since April 26.

==== May 4 ====
- Indiana: The total number of cases of coronavirus in the state for the first time reaches 20,000 (20,507) with the death toll increasing to 1,264. The state begins stage 2 of its "back on track", with many different businesses including retail and malls opening at 50% capacity. Restaurants will be able to open next week.
- Michigan: The total number of cases of coronavirus in the state increases to 43,950 with a death toll of 4,135. This represents the lowest increase in new cases (196) since April 27.
- Ohio: There are 20,474 cases reported, including 1,056 deaths. Manufacturing, distribution, and construction open up. General offices may also reopen, though employees are to work from home when possible.

==== May 5 ====
- Ohio: Governor DeWine discusses the state's economy during a press conference. At the end of February, Ohio was $200 million ahead of projections for the year. Ohio now has a projected budget shortfall of $776.9 million for the fiscal year, which will end June 30.

==== May 6 ====
- Maryland: Governor Larry Hogan announces that Maryland Public Schools are closed for the remainder of the 2019–2020 school year.
- Ohio: Governor DeWine announces a $775 million budget reduction over the next two months. Medicaid spending will be reduced by $210 million. Spending on K–12 schools will be reduced by $300 million. Spending on other education will be reduced by $55 million and higher education spending will be reduced by $110 million. All other agencies will lose $100 million.

==== May 27 ====
The number of COVID-19 deaths in the U.S. tops 100,000.

==== Status at the end of May ====
As of May 31, Our World in Data reported that for the U.S. there were 103,781 total deaths, 1.77 million confirmed cases, and about 14 million tests completed.

=== June ===
==== June 5 ====
The Pentagon reports biggest increase in the Department of Defense since mid- April on COVID-19 cases bringing the number up to 10,462. The DoD includes military members, their dependents, contractors and civilians. The United States Navy remains as the most affected Branch as of June 5.

==== Status at the end of June ====
As of June 30, Our World in Data reported that for the U.S. there were 126,140 total deaths, 2.59 million confirmed cases, and about 30 million tests completed.

=== July ===
==== July 14 ====
- The House Appropriations Committee approved a measure requiring masks on public transportation.

==== July 17 ====
- The U.S. recorded what was at the time the highest single-day rise in cases anywhere in the world, with 77,638 infections.

==== July 28 ====
- The CDC calls for reopening American schools, in a statement written by a White House working group that includes Redfield but has minimal representation from other CDC officials.

=== August ===
==== August 8 ====
- On August 8, the U.S. passed 5 million COVID-19 cases.

==== August 31 ====
- On August 31, the U.S. passed 6 million COVID-19 cases.

=== September ===
==== September 8 ====
- On September 8, the United States reported less than 25,000 daily cases for the first time since June.

==== September 22 ====
- On September 22, the United States surpassed 200,000 deaths from COVID-19. The Center for Disease Control released guidelines for Halloween.

==== September 25 ====
- On September 25, the U.S. passed 7 million COVID-19 cases.

=== October ===
==== October 2 ====
- On October 2, President Donald Trump and First Lady Melania Trump tested positive for COVID-19, among other officials during the White House COVID-19 outbreak.

==== October 6 ====
- On October 6, the vice commandant of the Coast Guard Charles W. Ray tested positive for COVID-19. Other military leaders were quarantined as a result.

==== October 15 ====
- On October 15, Kamala Harris paused her in-person campaigning after one of her staffers, Elizabeth M. Allen, tested positive.

==== October 16 ====
- On October 16, the U.S. passed 8 million COVID-19 cases.

==== October 30 ====
- On October 30, the U.S. passed 9 million COVID-19 cases.

=== November ===
==== November 5 ====
- On November 5, the U.S. reported a single-day count of more than 100,000 new cases for the first time.

==== November 9 ====
- On November 9, the U.S. passed 10 million COVID-19 cases.

==== November 15 ====
- On November 15, the U.S. passed 11 million COVID-19 cases.

==== November 21 ====
- On November 21, the U.S. passed 12 million COVID-19 cases, with a record high of more than 200,000 cases being reported in the preceding days.

==== November 27 ====
- On November 27, the U.S. passed 13 million COVID-19 cases.

=== December ===
==== December 2 ====
- On December 2, the U.S. passed 14 million cases and set records for the highest number of daily deaths (3,157), new infections (nearly 205k), and hospitalizations (over 100k).

==== December 8 ====
- On December 8, the U.S. passed 15 million cases, with about one out of every 22 Americans having tested positive since the pandemic began.

==== December 12 ====
- On December 12, the U.S. passed 16 million cases.

==== December 14 ====
- On December 14, the U.S. surpassed 300,000 deaths, with an average more than 961 deaths per day since the first known deaths in February. More than 50,000 deaths were reported in the past month.

==== December 17 ====
- On December 17, the U.S. passed 17 million cases.

==== December 21 ====
- On December 21, the U.S. passed 18 million cases.

==== December 24 ====
- On December 24, following concerns over a new SARS-CoV-2 variant from the United Kingdom, the CDC announced testing requirements for American passengers traveling from the UK, to be administered within 72 hours, starting on December 28.

==== December 26 ====
- By December 26, one out of every 1,000 Americans have died from COVID-19.

==== December 27 ====
- On December 27, the U.S. passed 19 million cases, having averaged 185,000 daily cases over the past week.

==== December 29 ====
- On December 29, a confirmed case of the new SARS-CoV-2 variant from the United Kingdom was reported in Colorado. This was the first such confirmed case in the United States. The patient was a male in his mid-20s who had no travel history.

==== December 30 ====
- On December 30, a confirmed case of the new SARS-CoV-2 variant from the United Kingdom was reported in California. The patient is from Southern California, according to the announcement from Newsom.

==== December 31 ====
- On December 31, a confirmed case of the new SARS-CoV-2 variant from the United Kingdom was reported in Florida. The patient is a Martin County man with no travel history.
