= 1947 New York City smallpox outbreak =

Smallpox outbreak

- Disease: Smallpox
- Location: New York City
- Arrival date: March 1, 1947
- Date: March 1, 1947 to April 24, 1947
- Confirmed cases: 12
- Hospitalized cases: 12
- Recovered: 10
- Deaths: 2
- Vaccinations: 6,350,000 adults and children

The 1947 New York City smallpox outbreak occurred in March 1947 and was declared ended on April 24, 1947. The outbreak marked the largest mass vaccination effort ever conducted for smallpox in America. Within three weeks of the discovery of the outbreak, the U.S. Public Health Service, in conjunction with New York City health officials, had procured the smallpox vaccine and inoculated over 6,350,000 adults and children. Of that number, 5,000,000 had been vaccinated within the first two weeks. The rapid response was credited with limiting the outbreak to 12 people, 10 of whom recovered, while 2 died.

== Background ==
On February 24, 1947, Eugene Le Bar, a 47-year-old rug merchant from Maine, and his wife, boarded a bus in Mexico City, where the couple had been vacationing, for the return trip to New York City. That evening, Le Bar fell ill with a headache and neck pain. Two days later, he developed a red rash. The couple arrived in Manhattan on March 1, checked into a midtown hotel, and did some sightseeing and shopping. By March 5, Le Bar had developed a fever and pronounced rash. He was admitted to Bellevue Hospital, but because of the rash was transferred three days later to Willard Parker Hospital, a communicable disease hospital also in Manhattan.

On admission to Willard Parker, the differential diagnosis was drug reaction (since Le Bar had reported taking proprietary headache powders and aspirin), erythema multiforme, Kaposi's varicelliform eruption, and smallpox. However, because Le Bar had a smallpox vaccination scar, an atypical rash, and no history of exposure, smallpox was immediately ruled out. A biopsy of the skin lesions did not reveal the Guarnieri bodies characteristic of smallpox. Following further tests, Le Bar was diagnosed with having a drug reaction to the headache powders and aspirin he had taken earlier. Despite supportive care, Le Bar's condition worsened, and he died on March 10.

== Epidemiology ==
Two patients on the same floor at Willard Parker Hospital with Le Bar were discharged soon after Le Bar's death. However, both patients, one a 22-month-old baby girl who had been treated for croup, and the other, Ishmael Acosta, a 27-year-old hospital worker who had been treated for mumps, were rehospitalized on March 21 and 27, respectively, with the same rash and fever that Le Bar had. Biopsies done on lesion from both patients showed Guarnieri bodies, establishing the diagnosis of smallpox. As soon as the diagnosis was made, all the patients and staff of Willard Parker Hospital were vaccinated for smallpox, while the New York City Department of Health and the U.S. Public Health Service were notified. All the known contacts of the baby girl and Acosta were also vaccinated.

A review of Le Bar's autopsy results and reexamination of the skin lesions this time demonstrated Guarnieri bodies and confirmed Le Bar had died of smallpox. Because he was the first case, he was designated the index patient. The next concern for the health department was tracking down Le Bar's contacts, including everybody who stayed at the hotel at the same time he did.

The immediate contacts at the hotel included guests still there and those who had checked out starting on the day Le Bar checked in. Guests who were still there were all vaccinated. Those who had left and gone to other states were advised to see their doctors and get vaccinated as soon as possible. The tracing of Le Bar's contacts included all passengers on the bus trip, including those who boarded or left at stops in seven states. The U.S. Public Health Service determined that passengers had final destinations in 29 states. Warnings were sent to the public health authorities in all 29 states, and all passengers were tracked down and advised to be inoculated as soon as possible. No cases were ultimately reported in any of the hotel guests or the bus passengers.

Others who came into contact with Le Bar included patients and staff at Bellevue and Willard Parker Hospitals. Coincidentally, Ishmael Acosta, the 27-year-old man who had been rehospitalized in Willard Parker, was an orderly at Bellevue. However, no contact with Le Bar had occurred at Bellevue because Acosta was already a patient at Willard Parker when Le Bar was admitted to Bellevue. However, during the time between Acosta's discharge from and readmission to Willard Parker, he had returned to work at Bellevue. Three male patients he had prepped and transported to surgery later developed fever and rash. They were transferred to Willard Parker and all three were diagnosed with smallpox. All of Le Bar's contacts in New York City, which numbered several hundred, were vaccinated and sequestered to prevent further spread of the illness.

A 4-year-old boy being treated for whooping cough at Willard Parker Hospital was discharged on March 10, the day Eugene Le Bar died. He was transferred to Cardinal Hayes Convalescent Home for Children, a Catholic nursing facility in Millbrook, New York. He subsequently developed a rash and fever. It was later determined that he had smallpox and was the source of infection for three others at the facility, including a 62-year-old nun, a 5-year-old boy, and a 2-year-old girl.

A 2 1/2-year-old boy admitted to Willard Parker Hospital for treatment of whooping cough just prior to Le Bar's death also came down with smallpox and was diagnosed on March 17. In addition, Carmen Acosta—Ishmael Acosta's wife—was admitted to Willard Parker Hospital on April 6 with a rash and fever, and was diagnosed with smallpox a day later. She died on April 12.

Eugene Le Bar's wife was contacted in Maine, where she had returned after her husband's death. She had been vaccinated prior to her departure from New York and remained healthy.

== Vaccination campaign ==
On April 4, 1947, New York City Mayor William O'Dwyer and Commissioner of Health Israel Weinstein informed the public about the smallpox outbreak and announced plans to vaccinate everybody in the city. At the time, the New York City Health Department had 250,000 individual doses of vaccine and 400,000 doses in bulk. O'Dwyer called an emergency meeting with the heads of the seven American pharmaceutical companies involved in vaccine production and asked them for a commitment to provide 6 million doses of vaccine. The pharmaceutical companies accomplished the task by putting the vaccine into round-the-clock production. Additional vaccine doses were obtained from the Army and Navy.

Vaccination clinics were set up around the city at hospitals, health department clinics, police and fire stations, and schools. Volunteers drawn from the American Red Cross, the City Health Department, off-duty police and firefighters, and the disbanded, but vast, World War II Air Raid Warden networks located in all of New York's coastal towns, went door-to-door to urge residents to get vaccinated. A radio and print ad campaign called, "Be sure, be safe, get vaccinated!" advertised the vaccination clinic locations and emphasized that vaccination was free. Within days, long lines formed outside the clinics. More than 600,000 New Yorkers were vaccinated in the first week. The vaccination clinics began closing April 26, with the last closing May 3, 1947.

== Morbidity and mortality of the disease ==
Twelve cases of smallpox were confirmed—9 in Manhattan and 3 in Millbrook. Seven were adults and 5 were children, the latter group all age 5 and under. The oldest patient was the 62-year-old nun. The youngest patient was the 22-month-old baby girl.

Two patients—Eugene Le Bar, age 47, and Carmen Acosta, age 25—died.

== Morbidity and mortality of the vaccine ==
As a result of the mass vaccination, there were 46 cases of encephalitis, or inflammation of the brain and spinal cord, resulting in 8 deaths in the following weeks. However, brain tissue was examined from all 8 fatalities, and in a report on the outbreak written by Commissioner of Health Weinstein, he stated that they had other diseases of the central nervous system and none had encephalitis. Three deaths were clearly related to other complications of the vaccine—a 66-year-old man who developed sepsis from an infected vaccination site, and two infants with eczema who developed generalized vaccinia after contact with others who had been vaccinated. Two additional victims who received the smallpox vaccine and died were named in newspaper reports—Benjamin F. Cohen, age 41, of Newark, New Jersey, who died on May 5, a little more than two weeks after being vaccinated, and Nancy Jean Vanderhoof, age 3, of New Providence, New Jersey, who died May 7, a week after receiving her vaccination. According to the Centers for Disease Control, the rate for post-vaccination encephalitis following the smallpox vaccine is 3 to 12 per million, and the fatality rate is about 1 in a million. (Since this was the largest vaccination campaign ever, it is likely to have contributed substantially to the C.D.C.'s data and estimates.)

== Postscripts ==
Even President Harry S. Truman received a vaccination for a brief trip to give a speech in New York City to news reporters.

There were two additional cases of smallpox transmitted in the New York City area at that same time—a merchant seaman who had temporarily lived with relatives in Manhattan from March 4 to 15, and R.C. Smith, a man who lived in Trenton, New Jersey, and died nearby in Camden, New Jersey, on April 17, 1947. Neither had any known contact with Le Bar or any of the cases traced to him.

New York Yankees pitcher Bill Bevens became ill from his vaccination and had to miss his scheduled start on April 29, 1947.

Bronx resident Sylvia Steinberg posed as a nurse representing a hospital and vaccinated about 500 people with water over three days. She pleaded guilty to unlawful practice of medicine, assault, and illegal possession of a hypodermic needle, and was sentenced to six months in jail.

The events associated with the smallpox outbreak were dramatized in the Columbia Pictures movie The Killer That Stalked New York, released in 1950. These events were also dramatized in the 1950 Radio show "Science Magazine of the Air" in episode #134 entitled "The Bell's Toll."

On January 3, 2021, Dr. Anthony Fauci, the Brooklyn-born Director of the National Institute of Allergy and Infectious Diseases, described his own experience in the 1947 smallpox outbreak, in specifying the potential speed of the U.S. national COVID-19 vaccination program. Fauci stated, "New York City, in March and April 1947, vaccinated 6,350,000 people; 5 million of which they did in two weeks. I was a six-year-old boy who was one of those who got vaccinated. So if New York City can do 5 million in two weeks, the United States could do a million a day. We can do it."

== See also ==
- Super-spreader
- Herd immunity
- List of cutaneous conditions
- Mathematics of mass vaccination
- Vaccine-naive
- Willard Parker Hospital
