= Ashwin Vasan =

American physician and public health leader

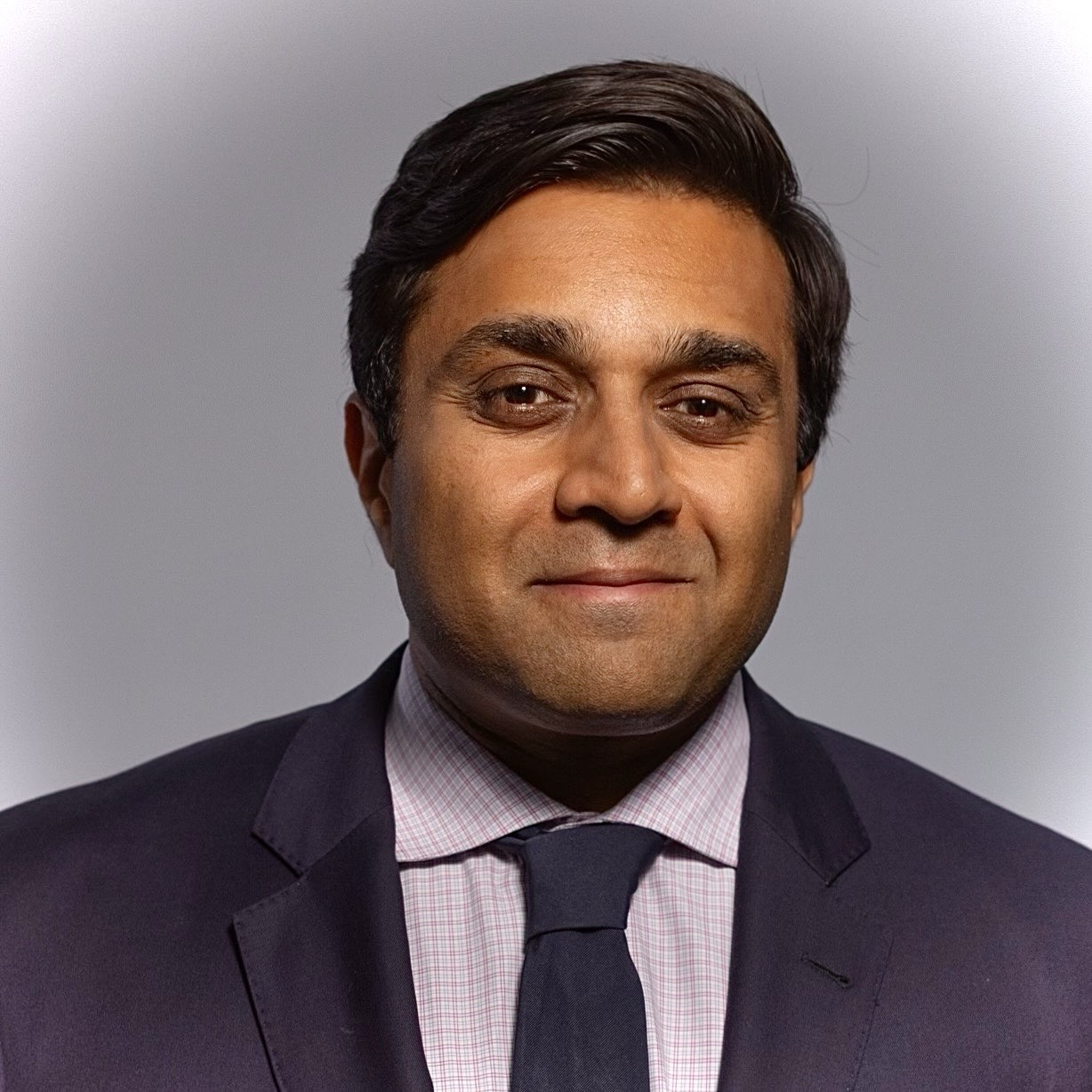

Commissioner of the New York City Department of Health
- In office March 15, 2022 – October 18, 2024
- Mayor: Eric Adams
- Preceded by: Dave A. Chokshi
- Succeeded by: Michelle E. Morse (acting)

Personal details
- Born: November 15, 1980 (age 45)
- Education: University of California, Los Angeles (BA); Harvard University (MS); University of Michigan (MD); London School of Hygiene & Tropical Medicine (PhD)
- Website: Official website

Ashwin Vasan (born November 15, 1980) is an American physician, epidemiologist, and health official. He served as the 44th commissioner of the New York City Department of Health and Mental Hygiene.

Vasan is credited with modernizing the agency's culture and processes as well as strengthening its data systems in preparation for future pandemics or health emergencies.

His research on infectious diseases, mental health, and primary care treatment have been published in numerous medical journals including NEJM, JAMA, and The Lancet.

Vasan was also the president and CEO of Fountain House, a national mental health nonprofit.

== Education ==
Vasan was born and raised in Chicago. His mother was a neonatologist and his father was a chemical engineer. Both of his parents immigrated to the United States from Chennai, India in the 1970s.

Vasan earned a Bachelor of Arts in economics from the University of California, Los Angeles, in 2001 and a Master of Science in epidemiology from the Harvard School of Public Health in 2004. He graduated from University of Michigan Medical School in 2011 and later earned a PhD from the London School of Hygiene & Tropical Medicine in 2016. He completed his medical training in internal medicine at NewYork-Presbyterian Hospital.

== Professional career ==
=== World Health Organization ===
After earning his Master's degree from Harvard, Vasan began his career at the World Health Organization working with Jim Yong Kim to address the global HIV/AIDS epidemic. As a technical officer in the early 2000s with WHO, Vasan helped launch the 3by5 Initiative which sought to provide antiretroviral treatment to three million people living with AIDS in developing and transitional countries by the end of 2005.

While at WHO, Vasan took a one-year secondment in Uganda with the Ministry of Health of Uganda and Partners In Health where he focused on improving the government anti-retrovirus treatment program. Vasan was responsible for sharing his findings with researchers in Rwanda to inform PIH's expansion of HIV services in that country.

=== Partners in Health ===
Vasan returned to Rwanda for the better part of two years during medical school working as a consultant with Partners in Health to develop a program to train nurses and improve care in rural health centers.

=== Columbia University ===
In 2014 Vasan joined the faculty of the Columbia University Mailman School of Public Health, and the Department of Medicine at Columbia's Vagelos College of Physicians & Surgeons. Vasan saw patients as a primary care internist in the Division of General Medicine at New York-Presbyterian Hospital/Columbia University Irving Medical Center and instructed students in global health and implementation science.

While working at NY Presbyterian Hospital, in 2016 Vasan was appointed by Mary T. Bassett to serve as the founding executive director of the New York City Department of Health and Mental Hygiene's Health Access Equity Unit, a city-wide initiative aimed at improving the health and social welfare of marginalized communities in New York City with a particular focus on formerly incarcerated people.

=== Fountain House ===
In September 2019, Vasan was named president and CEO of Fountain House, a national mental health nonprofit providing employment, education, housing, health and wellness programs to the mentally ill. In this role he was a strong advocate for making community-based solutions a top priority and standard practice to serve New York City's mentally ill population. During his tenure, Vasan secured new gifts from the Ford Foundation and MacKenzie Scott, which was announced after his departure. For his work, Vasan was recognized as a GLG Social Impact Fellow in 2021. He left Fountain House in January 2022 following his appointment as Commissioner of the NYC Health Department.

=== Tenure as NYC Health Commissioner ===
Vasan was appointed as Health Commissioner of New York City on December 21, 2021 by NYC Mayor-elect Eric Adams, and served as the Senior Public Health Advisor to City Hall before formally taking over the health department in March 2022. This two month transition period was implemented due to the ongoing Omicron wave of COVID-19.

Vasan outlined a series of goals including:

- Improving outcomes for preventable illness and death, including chronic and diet-related diseases;
- Addressing mental illness and social isolation;
- Reducing the impacts of violence;
- Reducing Black maternal mortality while making NYC a model for women's health;
- Mobilizing against the health impacts of climate change.

==== Covid-19 response ====
Vasan began his tenure on March 15, 2022 and was immediately tasked with steering the Administration's strategy on vaccination, testing, and new treatments. While other COVID-related mandates were announced on March 7, 2022 by prior Health Department leadership, they decided to maintain the under-5 mask mandate for a limited period until pediatric vaccinations were approved. When this approval was delayed, and cases began to rise, Mayor Adams announced that the mask mandate would be extended due to these factors, generating uproar amongst parent groups and other anti-COVID policies and anti-government activists. Within his first month on the job, an angry crowd gathered outside of Vasan's Brooklyn home protesting the City's under-5 mask mandate. At one point, someone began pounding on his door and police were called. Protest at his home continued regularly until Fall 2022, and Vasan filed restraining order against a protestor that attacked him in front of his home on his way home from work. For the remainder of his term, Vasan was assigned a police detail for his own protection.

In May 2022 Vasan implemented a telehealth and home delivery program for Paxlovid. The results of the program were later compiled and published in JAMA. A month later, he led NYC's response to the mpox outbreak by launching vaccination clinics despite extremely limited supplies of medication. Vasan's aggressive response to the virus was later credited with bringing an end to the outbreak in February 2023.

==== Response to Dobbs v. Jackson Women's Health Organization ====
Under Vasan, the Department of Health launched an Abortion Access Hub in January 2023 in response to the Dobb's decision. The resource enabled people from across the U.S to be directed to reproductive health and abortion care in New York City. As part of the effort, New York City became the first city to offer medication abortion at its public health clinics in addition to telehealth access. Vasan later published the results of the program in the New England Journal of Medicine.

==== Focus on mental health ====
In March, 2023, Vasan published a 72-page plan called “Care, Community, Action: A Mental Health Plan for NYC” which focused on youth mental health, overdoses, and serious mental illness. In support of the project, the agency launched NYC TeenSpace in December 2023 to provide teenagers with no-cost telehealth therapy. Within its first six month of operation, more than 7,000 teens had signed up for the program. As part of the plan to support the mentally ill, Vasan launched an effort to move people with depression and other mental health conditions into temporary homes or “clubhouses” where they would be given resources for their conditions as well as employment training. The program was financed with a $30 million investment by NYC to create more clubhouses, doubling the investment from previous years.

Vasan supported evidence in line with Surgeon General's Advisories on Social Media and Youth Mental Health, that social media had a measurable and detrimental impact on the mental health of young people. In the spring of 2023, his agency hosted a summit titled “Protecting Our Kids After the Pandemic: NYC's Role in the National Crisis of Social Media and Youth Mental Health.” The program brought together more than 100 experts as well as young people themselves, to develop local solutions to a national problem. The resulting report outlined a series of recommendations [ii] which later formed the basis of the City's February 2024 lawsuit against Meta, TikTok, YouTube and Snapchat. He also issued an Advisory declaring social media a public health crisis, mandating the Department of Health and Mental Hygiene to develop resources, supports and educational materials for parents, teachers, and young people on the risks of excessive or inappropriate use of social media, and recommending that all parents delay smartphones or other devices where social media is accessible until at least age 14.

==== Population health data and life expectancy ====
In October 2023, Vasan's agency launched the Center for Population Health Data Science to link data from public health, healthcare, and social service agencies and more fully measure the health of New Yorkers. The following month, the department launched HealthyNYC, a campaign aimed at increasing life expectancy to its highest-ever mark of 83 years old by 2030 by tackling these leading causes of preventable death. This agenda was later passed into local law, making HealthyNYC a permanent feature of city planning and specific roadmaps were published on how to achieve these goals. Vasan proposed that the program could be a model to address nationwide declines in life expectancy.

==== Healthcare affordability ====
Vasan oversaw the Department of Health's launch of the first municipal Office of Healthcare Accountability, promoting hospital price transparency for key services and procedures at NYC hospitals. In June 2023, Mayor Adams signed a law which allowing New Yorkers to compare costs charged by New York City hospitals for the same service. In January 2024, Vasan led an effort to cancel $2 billion in medical debt for 500,000 low-income New Yorkers over three years.

==== Resignation ====
On September 23, 2024, in the midst of the investigations into the Eric Adams administration, Vasan announced that he will leave his position as NYC Health Commissioner after a nearly three-year term, citing family reasons, and later moved up that date to October 18, citing "greater urgency". The Health Department and City Hall confirmed that his resignation was unrelated to the criminal investigation of Mayor Eric Adams. In an interview with The New York Times, Vasan was quoted as saying "I'm so far away from that world, and my focus has been on the health of the city."

== Academic career ==
Vasan was named as a Senior Leadership Fellow at the Harvard T.H. Chan School of Public Health in September 2024. That same month, he was named as a Distinguished Fellow at the School of Global Health at Meharry Medical College. He joined Yale School of Public Health in September 2025.

== Board service ==
Vasan has served on the boards of NYC Health+Hospitals, and Public Health Solutions.

He was also a member of the City & State advisory board.

Vasan was a signatory of Barak Obama's 2008 campaign health plan and an advisor to Pete Buttigieg's 2020 presidential campaign.

== Selection publications ==
- Mobile Mpox Vaccination in New York City Provided Flexible Community-Responsive Vaccine Access During the 2022 Global Mpox Emergency (2025)
- NYC's Overdose Prevention Centers: Data from the First Year of Supervised Consumption Services (2024)
- Ensuring Widespread and Equitable Access to Treatments for COVID-19 (2022)
- Trauma-Informed Care: a Strategy to Improve Primary Healthcare Engagement for Persons with Criminal Justice System Involvement (2019)
- Beyond hypertension: integrated cardiovascular care as a path to comprehensive primary care (2018)

== Personal life ==
Vasan lives in Brooklyn with his wife and three children.

== See also ==
- Indian Americans in New York City
