= Oxiris Barbot =

American pediatrician and public health official

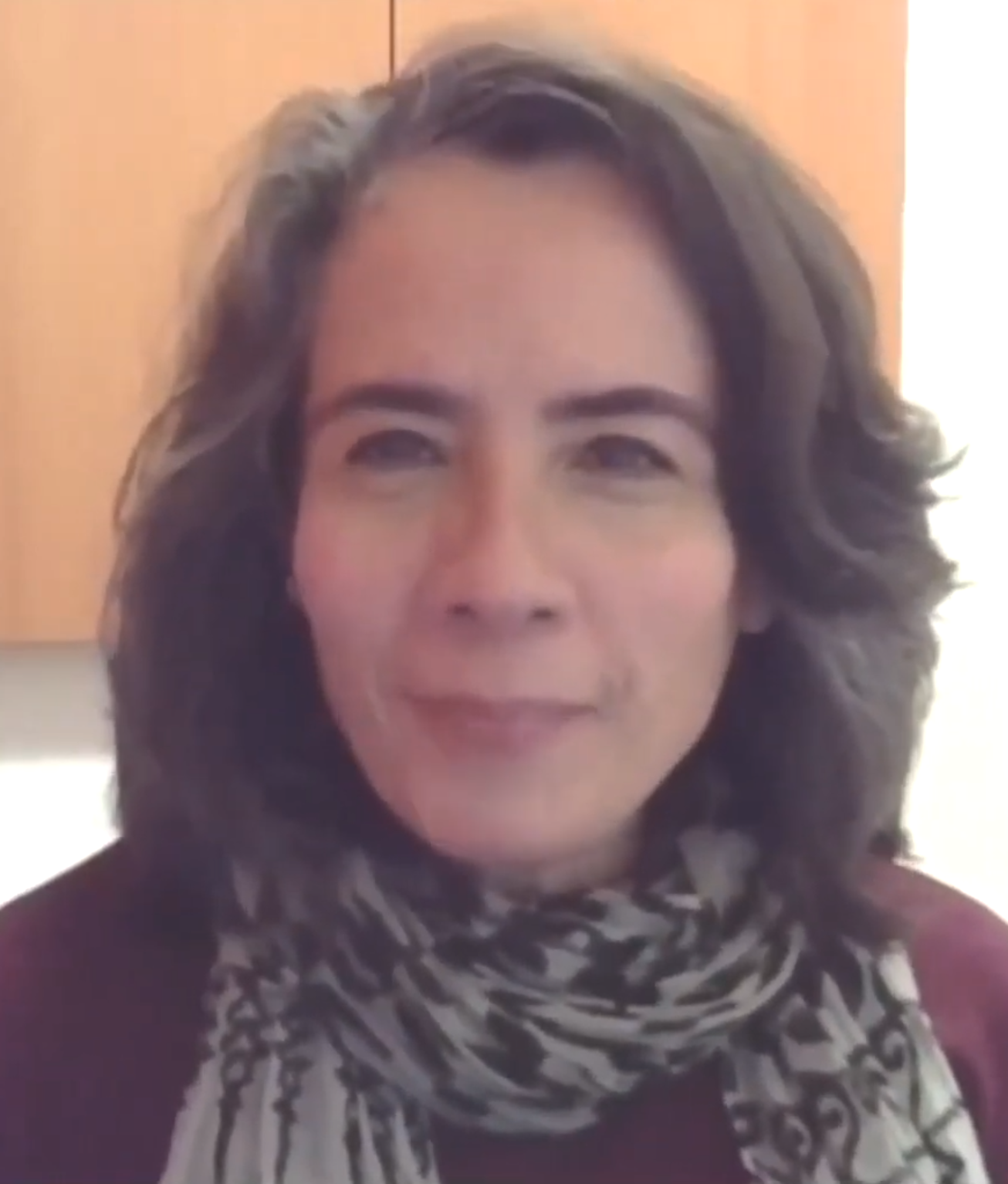
- Barbot in 2020

Commissioner of the New York City Department of Health
- In office December 19, 2018 – August 4, 2020; Acting: September 1, 2018 – December 19, 2018
- Mayor: Bill de Blasio
- Preceded by: Mary T. Bassett
- Succeeded by: Dave A. Chokshi

Personal details
- Born: 1965 or 1966 Manhattan, New York City, US
- Education: Yale University (BA); University of Medicine and Dentistry of New Jersey (MD)
- Occupation: Pediatrician

Oxiris Barbot (/ɔːkˈsiːriːs/, born 1965 or 1966) is an American pediatrician who served as the Commissioner of Health of the City of New York from 2018 to 2020. She was then appointed to public health positions with Columbia University and the JPB Foundation, and in 2022 became president and chief executive officer of the nonprofit United Hospital Fund.

== Early life and education ==
Barbot was born at Bellevue Hospital in Kips Bay, Manhattan in New York City, and refers to herself as a "Nuyorican," a term of pride used by New Yorkers who have deep Puerto Rican roots. She lived in the Patterson Houses in Mott Haven, Bronx, before moving with her mother to northern New Jersey. Barbot was a trailblazer from an early age when she was the starting pitcher for an all-boys baseball team in the 1970s.

Barbot received a bachelor of arts degree from Yale University (graduating in 1987) and a medical degree from the University of Medicine and Dentistry of New Jersey (graduating in 1991). She completed her pediatric residency at George Washington University's Children's National Medical Center.

== Early career ==
Barbot was the chief of pediatrics and community medicine at Unity Health Care, Inc., a health center in Washington, DC. Starting in 2003, she served as medical director of the Office of School Health at the New York City Department of Health and Mental Hygiene and the NYC Department of Education.

It was during this early phase in her career as a community pediatrician that Barbot became more attuned to the ways in which policy at the federal and local level can dramatically affect the lives of everyday Americans.

She was recruited in 2010 to be commissioner of the Baltimore City Health Department, where she was the principal architect of Healthy Baltimore 2015, the city's roadmap for better health outcomes. It was Baltimore City's first health agenda with a racial equity lens that incorporated measures addressing the social determinants of health such as food access, oversaturation of liquor outlets in communities of color, and the built environment. Barbot's leadership was instrumental in Baltimore City being the first jurisdiction in the country to use the zoning code to amortize the number of alcohol outlets in residential communities as a remedy for oversaturation.

Barbot served as the first deputy commissioner of the New York City Department of Health and Mental Hygiene, starting in 2014. Barbot led the agency's first public health deployment outside of NYC to Puerto Rico to provide public health support in the aftermath of Hurricane Maria. She returned to Puerto Rico with her team to provide mental health support for teachers struggling to provide stability for the island's public school students. She has written and talked about the mental health impacts of climate change.

== Commissioner of Health of the City of New York ==
Barbot was the Commissioner of Health of the City of New York, a position she was appointed to in December 2018 by Mayor Bill de Blasio, succeeding Mary T. Bassett. She was the first Latina to head the Health Department.

=== Measles outbreak ===
On April 9, 2019, Barbot, along with de Blasio, declared a public health emergency as the city faced the largest measles outbreak since 1991, requiring residents and workers in the most-affected neighborhoods to be vaccinated against measles or face possible fines. In a press conference that day, Barbot stated that 21 people were hospitalized and five were admitted to an intensive care unit out of the 285 reported cases. Barbot and de Blasio announced the end to the measles public health emergency on September 3, 2019.

=== Coronavirus pandemic ===
Barbot led New York City through the onset of the COVID-19 pandemic in early 2020, "when the state was seeing almost 1,000 daily deaths", in her role as the city's Health Commissioner.

In mid-February 2020, as the disease was spreading from China but before any cases were confirmed in New York, Barbot joined city leaders in urging residents not to stigmatize New York's Chinatowns, saying: "There is no reason to avoid public settings, including subways and—most of all—our city's famous Chinese restaurants and small businesses." Over the next two weeks, as superspreading events proliferated around the world with limited testing, she turned more cautious. As she later told CNBC: "It was apparent by late February that the coronavirus had the potential to become catastrophic." March 1 marked the first confirmation of the virus in the city and state.

In mid-March 2020, Barbot denied a New York City Police Department (NYPD) request for 500,000 surgical masks. In a "heated exchange" for which she soon apologized, she told NYPD Chief of Department Terence Monahan she could only provide 50,000, insisting "I need them for others", referring to the doctors and nurses on the front lines and then added “I don’t give two rats’ asses about your cops.” The Detectives' Endowment Association, Sergeants Benevolent Association, and Police Benevolent Association called for her to be fired, as did Democratic Representative Max Rose.

Ultimately, citing her "deep disappointment" with the mayor's limited use of the health department's expertise, Barbot resigned on August 4, 2020. In a BBC documentary released in March 2021, Barbot stated that her early warnings to de Blasio were largely ignored, and that New York City's delayed decisions to close schools and mandate lockdowns "cost thousands of lives."

In July 2021, Barbot signed on to a letter opposing de Blasio's decision to move the city's homeless population out of city hotels, due to the risk of spreading COVID-19. Barbot's predecessor as health commissioner, Mary T. Bassett, also signed on to the letter.

Government offices
Preceded by Mary T. Bassett	Commissioner of Health of the City of New York; 2018–2020	Succeeded by Dave A. Chokshi
