= Alister Martin (physician) =

American physician and public health advocate

Commissioner of the New York City Department of Health and Mental Hygiene
- Incumbent
- Assumed office January 31, 2026
- Preceded by: Michelle E. Morse

Personal details
- Born: Jackson Heights, Queens, New York City, New York, U.S.
- Education: Rutgers University (BA); Harvard Kennedy School (MPP); Harvard Medical School (MD)
- Occupation: Physician, public health advocate
- Known for: CEO and Founder of A Healthier Democracy, Assistant Professor at Harvard Medical School

Alister Martin is an American physician and public health advocate who serves as the Commissioner of the New York City Department of Health and Mental Hygiene, appointed by Mayor Zohran Kwame Mamdani in January 2026. He is an Emergency Medicine physician, assistant professor at Harvard Medical School, and the founder of several civic health initiatives, including Vot-ER, a nonpartisan voter registration program based in healthcare settings.

== Early life and education ==
Martin was born in Jackson Heights, Queens, New York City, and raised by his mother, a Haitian immigrant. Martin has also indicated he grew up in Neptune, New Jersey. Martin was dismissed from his high school due to being involved in an off-campus fight before enrolling in Bollettieri Tennis Academy and obtaining his GED.

Martin graduated summa cum laude from Rutgers University, where he was a Division I tennis player. He earned his Master of Public Policy (MPP) from the Harvard Kennedy School, where he was a fellow at the Center for Public Leadership. Martin received his Doctor of Medicine (MD) from Harvard Medical School in 2015 as a Presidential Scholar.

== Medical career ==
Martin completed his residency in emergency medicine at Massachusetts General Hospital and Brigham and Women's Hospital, part of the Harvard-Affiliated Emergency Medicine Residency program, from 2015 to 2019. He served as Chief Resident.

As a practicing emergency department physician at Massachusetts General Hospital, Martin is an assistant professor at Harvard Medical School and research faculty at the Harvard Kennedy School Behavioral Insights Group. He is also faculty at the MGH Center for Social Justice and Health Equity.

== Public Health Initiatives ==
=== Vot-ER ===
In response to low voter registration rates in vulnerable communities, Martin founded Vot-ER, a nonpartisan voter registration initiative that operates in healthcare settings. The program has organized over 50,000 healthcare workers across all 50 states and more than 700 hospitals and clinical sites to help patients register to vote. Healthcare providers participating in the program wear lanyards with QR codes that direct patients to their state's voter registration website. Vot-ER has also created networks to help patients vote from hospital beds via emergency absentee ballots.

=== Get Waivered ===
Martin founded Get Waivered, a campaign aimed at transforming emergency departments into access points for addiction recovery services. The program helps emergency department physicians obtain DEA waivers (prior to the elimination of the waiver requirement) and establishes processes to prescribe buprenorphine and other medications for opioid use disorder.

=== GOTVax ===
During the COVID-19 pandemic, Martin co-founded GOTVax, an initiative that delivered vaccines directly to vulnerable and underserved communities through targeted mobile vaccine clinics. The program applied get-out-the-vote organizing principles to public health outreach.

=== A Healthier Democracy ===
Martin serves as CEO of A Healthier Democracy, a nonprofit healthcare organizing incubator based at Northeastern University's Burnes Center for Social Change, where he is a Senior Fellow. The organization develops programs at the intersection of healthcare and civic engagement to serve vulnerable populations.

=== Link Health ===
Martin founded Link Health, a nonprofit initiative that operates under A Healthier Democracy and connects vulnerable individuals with federal benefit programs through healthcare based enrollment strategies. The organization uses in-person and digital methods to streamline access to resources such as the Lifeline program, SNAP, LIHEAP, and other assistance programs. The program employs community health workers and patient navigators who screen patients during their visits to community health centers.

== Government Service ==
Prior to his appointment as NYC Health Commissioner, Martin served in several government roles. In 2013, he worked as a Health Policy Aide to Governor Peter Shumlin of Vermont during the state's exploration of a single-payer healthcare system, where he led communications planning for Vermont's proposed "Green Mountain Care" plan. He also served as a health policy aide to Congressman Raul Ruiz of California.

Martin was selected as a White House Fellow for the 2021-2022 class and served as an advisor in the Office of the Vice President under Kamala Harris and in the White House Office of Public Engagement. While a Fellow in Washington D.C., Martin was credited with rescuing a bystander who was struck by lightening outside the White House.

== New York City Health Commissioner ==
On January 31, 2026, Mayor Zohran Kwame Mamdani appointed Martin as the 45th Commissioner of the New York City Department of Health and Mental Hygiene. Martin oversees an agency with more than 7,000 employees and an annual budget of approximately $1.6 billion.

== Recognition and Publications ==
Martin's work has been featured in major media outlets including The New York Times and Scientific American. His research has been published in medical journals including the New England Journal of Medicine, JAMA, and the British Medical Journal.

Martin was awarded an Aspen Institute Health Innovators Fellowship and is an alumnus of the New Leaders Council. He received the Harvard Medical School Office for Diversity Inclusion and Community Partnership (DICP) Faculty Fellowship for 2022–2023. In 2025, He was awarded the American Public Health Association's APHA Award for Excellence, which "[r]ecognizes an individual for making a significant and well-recognized contributions to the improvement of community health by utilizing scientific knowledge or innovative organizational strategies."
