= Mass vaccination =

Administration of a vaccine to large populations

Mass vaccination is a public policy effort to vaccinate a large number of people, possibly the entire population of the world or of a country or region, within a short period of time. This policy may be directed during a pandemic, when there is a localized outbreak or scare of a disease for which a vaccine exists, or when a new vaccine is invented.

Under normal circumstances, vaccines are provided as part of an individual's medical care starting from birth and given as part of routine checkups. But there are times when there is a need to quickly vaccinate the population at large and provide easy access to the service. When this occurs, temporary clinics may be established around communities that can efficiently handle the many people within at once.

Challenges of a mass vaccination effort include vaccine supply, logistics, storage, finding vaccinators and other necessary staff, vaccine safety and public outreach.

== Historic mass vaccinations ==
=== Measles ===
Measles is a viral infection known for its highly contagious properties. Infection with measles is transmitted through the respiratory tract and can manifest as fevers, the "three C's of measles": cough, coryza (runny nose), conjunctivitis(red/watery eyes), and a maculopapular rash. Prevention can be achieved with vaccination, as a single dose is 93% effective against measles and both doses of the two-shot series provides 97% effectiveness against measles. Management of measles, not prevention of measles, can be accomplished with vitamin A supplementation.

==== Measles History ====
Measles was first described by physicians in the 9th century. In the centuries after, as explorers traveled from their borders and encountered new populations, these previously unexposed groups were acutely effected by measles. It wasn't until 1757 that Francis Home discovered the cause of measles to be as a result of infection from a pathogen. Deaths from measles dropped by the 20th century due to advances in medicine and standards of living, though this improvement was largely seen in developed nations. Globally, there is still a documented yearly occurrence of 2 million deaths from 30 million cases.

==== Vaccine Development ====
John Franklin Enders developed a live measles vaccine which underwent testing from 1958 to 1960, followed by public licensing in 1963. The vaccine used in the United States since 1968 was a vaccine developed by Maurice Hilleman, which is a weaker live vaccine and showed increased efficacy, leading to a more effective measles vaccine. In 1971, the Measles vaccine began to be produced as a combined vaccine with two other newly developed vaccines: mumps and rubella (MMR Vaccine). In 1989, the two-dose regimen of the MMR vaccine began due to improved immunity developed from two doses rather than one.

==== Measles Eradication Efforts ====
Under the Vaccination Assistance Act of 1962, President John F. Kennedy directed federal money to states in an effort to provide affordable and effective vaccinations to children and the broader population. By 1965, President Lyndon B. Johnson worked with Congress to extend the Vaccination Assistance Act to cover Measles. In 1967, Johnson and the CDC set out to eradicate measles and saw a drop in weekly measles cases from 1,000 to 200. Cases of measles dropped in 1968 with 22,000 cases compared to 450,000 cases per year prior to the advent of the vaccine. Following an uptick in cases in the early 1970s President Jimmy Carter set a goal for 90% vaccination, achieved partly through school mandates. This found success, with 96% of school children being vaccinated by the end of his term in 1981 and a record low number of cases: 2,600. Through the 80's and early 90's, vaccination hesitancy picked up steam. This was met by President Bill Clinton with the Comprehensive Child Immunization Act of 1993. By 2000, the last full year of his second term, the United States officially declared measles had been eradicated.

==== Barriers to Efforts ====
As with any mass vaccination effort, vaccine-hesitancy remains a major barrier to maintaining low levels of measles cases. A key cause of this challenge was a research article written in 1998 in "The Lancet" claimed to show a link between autism and the MMR vaccine. In the wake of the article, negative news coverage of the MMR vaccine increased along with vaccine skepticism. "The Lancet" retraced the paper in 2010 for incorrect data resulting from the study and for unethical treatment of the children in the study. Due to the high infectivity rate of measles, the vaccination level to reach 'herd immunity' is 95%. However, anti-vaccination campaigns and misinformation has caused the vaccination level to dip below the threshold, leading to a rise in measles cases in the USA. Despite previously declaring measles had been eliminated in the US, there is now a Measles resurgence in the United States.

=== Smallpox ===
==== Early successes in eradication (prior to 1950) ====
In 1947, after a man traveled from Mexico to New York City and developed smallpox, Dr. Israel Weinstein announced to the residents of New York the need to get vaccinated. Vaccine clinics were established throughout the city and within less than a month, 6,350,000 residents were vaccinated. This was enabled by improvements in vaccine production and storage. Prior to new developments, transportation represented a major issue and hindered mass vaccinations. Because smallpox vaccination requires a live virus, it originally required a sample to be transferred from person-to-person or animal-to-person directly. The creation of a liquid vaccine stored in capillary tubes marked a major advancement for the smallpox vaccine. This method involved the use of glycerol as a preservative and was significant for storage and transportation. In addition to these benefits, it enabled mass production through the use of animals, and ensured long term viability at temperatures below freezing. However, this method was insufficient to enable widespread vaccination in tropical regions of the world, and thus was largely restricted to temperate countries. Compulsory vaccinations were used throughout the beginning of the 20th century in a most of these countries, which led to the decline of smallpox. For countries such as the United States, Canada, the United Kingdom, and some other European countries, outbreaks were quickly shut down by strong public health policies. Soon, the more deadly Variola Major smallpox variant steadily declined, and endemics were only brought on by travelers from countries that lacked control over smallpox outbreaks. It's important to note that the milder Variola Minor smallpox variant remained prevalent until the mid-20th century, as it often didn't warrant hospital visits or was misdiagnosed. The success of health policies in controlling and eliminating smallpox by the 1950s in many countries led some to believe that the world eradication of smallpox would be possible.

==== Interest in worldwide eradication (1950-1959) ====
The creation of a heat stable, freeze-dried vaccine occurred in the 1950s. Further improvements in freeze-drying technology allowed for the mass production of the vaccine at a commercial level. The Health Assembly, a group within the World Health organization (WHO), began discussing the possibility of eliminating smallpox between 1950 and 1955. The idea was ultimately rejected, as many viewed it an impossible task to take on. In 1958, a professor from the USSR, acting as a Health Assembly delegate, once again pushed the idea of smallpox being an issue for all countries, whether or not endemics are still occurring. He presented a report to the Eleventh World Health Assembly, which argued that world eradication of the disease is possible, as shown by the success of countries that managed to eliminate it through health policy. This was particularly significant as the professor, Viktor Zhdanov, had come to the conclusion on his own, without knowledge of arguments from previous World Health Assemblies. In this Zhdanov Report, he used the USSR as an example, arguing that the success of mandatory vaccinations throughout his country proves that it's possible to eliminate it in any country. Zhdanov offered the support of the USSR, and backed the legitimacy of the report through the donation of millions of vaccines and previous offers of support to central-Asian countries. The method of eradication would that was proposed involved the use of the newly developed freeze-dried vaccinations and mandatory vaccination. Surveillance containment programs was also mentioned, which actually came to dominate in the later years of the eradication campaign. Over the course of the next year, resolutions coordinating the start of the program, as well as to ensure the success of it, were made. During the Twelve World Health Assembly in 1959, the proposal of an eradication campaign for smallpox was voted for successfully.

==== Smallpox eradication program (1960-1966) ====
The eradication of smallpox seemed to be easier and less costly than other previously eradicated diseases. Smallpox had no vectors, as humans were the only reservoirs carrying the disease. Furthermore, the elimination of the disease would be mostly on mass vaccination and did not require vector control. Directed by Donald Henderson, this first effort involved the use of mass vaccinations with a goal to have 80% of every country's population immunized. Although the program was brought forth by WHO, implementation would largely depend on individual governments. WHO would be responsible for supporting the programs through vaccine production, and training of staff. Each country would be required to cover most of the costs and actual functions of the program. A lack of universal commitment from countries hindered this campaign allowing smallpox to remain prevalent almost a decade later. This was particularly a problem in developing countries. The WHO was not designed to provide considerable material support and close collaboration between countries on a wide scale. Over the first few years of the program's initiation, a lack of donations of vaccines and money hindered the success of the program. The WHO created the Expert Committee on Smallpox in 1964 due to the lack of progress. A report was released giving a more clear strategy to be implemented, in the form of different phases. Based on outbreaks that occurred in India in regions that claimed to have more than 80% vaccination rates, the committee determined that 100% of the population would need to be vaccinated in the first mass vaccination phase. After this, they would focus on stopping subsequent cases and investigating them. This was not well received during the Seventeenth World Health Assembly, in which many express doubts over the success especially with extreme vaccine shortages following a lack of donations. It wasn't until 1965 that the USA increased commitment to the cause, yet not out of interest but because they were already starting a measles eradication campaign and felt this could be added on. This along with continued support from the USSR led the WHO to develop an intensified program for smallpox eradication, however many members still lacked confidence in this new program's success.

==== Intensified smallpox eradication program (1967-1980) ====
From 1967, the Intensified Smallpox Program now called for surveillance reporting and investigation in addition to mass vaccination. Teams were directed to find alternative or unique solutions in their regions. In the years following the initiation of this plan, the WHO saw an increase in qualified volunteers, contributions from countries and participation in their campaign. They worked on increasing training of staff and publicizing the program worldwide. Improvements in procedures and technology had a significant effect on advancing the program. Particularly, the invention of the bifurcated needle made administration of vaccines in the field more practical than the previously used jet-injectors. The number of outbreaks, instead of the percent of population vaccinated, became the new focus. By 1973, smallpox only remained a problem in five countries. Improved methods of surveillance and containment, as well as a large increase in support, was a critical part of finally eradicating smallpox. The regions would contain the spread out smallpox through vaccinating anyone exposed to an infected person; this was the method of ring vaccination. It would not be until May 8, 1980, during the World Health Assembly that smallpox was announced as officially eradicated.

==== Criticism of mass vaccination ====
Vaccination policies were not met without resistance, as countries that had mandatory vaccination policies saw a rise in antivaccination movements. In Brazil, compulsory vaccination was met with riots. The lack of control led to large outbreaks and many deaths. Other countries had more success in vaccination, which led to Variola Minor replacing Variola Major as the cause of smallpox outbreaks in these countries. Antivaccinationists rejected vaccination policy more, as this more mild form was not seen as significant. This was particularly an issue in the United States as only some states had compulsory vaccination, while others banned or lacked laws for it.

=== Polio ===
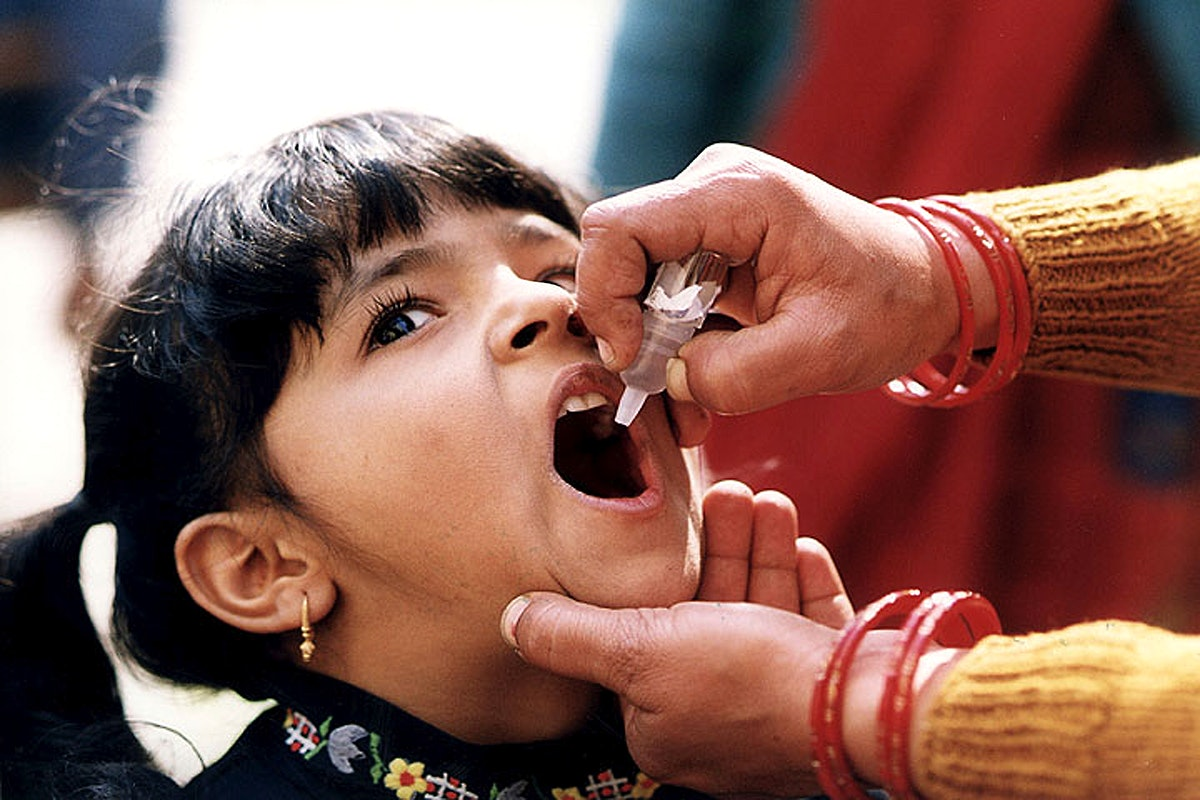
A young Indian girl receiving a dose of oral polio vaccine by a trained healthcare worker.

Poliomyelitis is a disease which causes lower body paralysis through the damage of motor neurons caused by three strains of the poliovirus. Only 1% of polio cases actually result in paralysis. In 1916, the United States experienced a polio epidemic which paralyzed over 27,000 people and lead to 6,000 deaths. These outbreaks gradually became worse and worse as it spread throughout the Americas and to Europe. Jonas Salk developed the first inactivated polio vaccine (IPV) in 1953 which was tested in a clinical trial that enrolled 1.6 million children in Canada, Finland and the United States. With the distribution of Salk's vaccine, cases decreased from 13.9 to 0.8 cases per 100,000 in a period of only 7 years from 1954 to 1961. By 1956, Albert Sabin had created the live-attenuated vaccine also known as the oral polio vaccine (OPV) which contained three types of wild polio strains. After almost two decades in 1972, Sabin decided to donate his vaccine strains to the World Health Organization (WHO) which greatly increased the distribution and accessibility of the vaccine across the world.

In the years following the development of the vaccines from 1977 to 1995, children who had been fully vaccinated with all three doses of OPV had risen from 5% to 80%. In 1988, the World Health Assembly decided to make efforts to completely eradicate polio by the year 2000 with a large amount of the progress occurring before the target date. This effort was titled the Global Polio Eradication Initiative and has seen wild success with a decrease in 99% of cases worldwide by 2018. When the global campaign began in 1988, there were over 125 polio-endemic countries compared to only 20 by the year 2000. Wealthier countries with better infrastructure were able to use more resources and introduce better health strategies to achieve herd immunity early on. The WHO Region of the Americas declared themselves to be polio free in 1994. Following this enormous achievement, other WHO regions quickly followed with the Western Pacific Region declared polio free in 2000, the European Region in 2002 and South-East Asia Region in 2014.

Mass vaccination strategies such as National Immunization Days were key to the success of the oral polio vaccine (OPV). In South America, transmission rates severely declined in the mid-1980s following the invention and widespread use of the OPV. With such an incredibly high amount of vaccinations within a short time frame, the overall incidence of Polio was decreased. Other countries such as India, were able to vaccinate over 120 million children in large scale vaccination days which became a regular occurrence.

==== Polio campaigns in America ====
Several famous Americans helped pave the way for the acceptance of the polio vaccine in the United States. Franklin D. Roosevelt, one of the most famous polio patients in the world, created the National Foundation for Infantile Paralysis in 1938 which eventually became known as March of Dimes. The March of Dimes funded a large portion of the polio research all throughout the epidemic and eventually resulted in the development of the vaccine by Jonas Salk. Following the years after its invention and distribution, polio cases decreased from tens of thousands to only a handful per year. With the help of Elvis Presley, who took the vaccine publicly, the acceptance of the polio vaccine increased even further. This act embodied three of the most important pillars of a behavioral change campaign: social influence, social norms and examples. Elvis Presley used his social influence to normalize getting the polio vaccine, which increased vaccination rates among American youth to over 80% in just under 6 months. These types campaigns were the heart of the mass vaccination efforts in America.

==== Barriers to eradication ====
Despite the global efforts to vaccinate and eradicate polio, the virus still causes outbreaks every year. As of 2021, only wild polio virus type 1(WPV1) affects the world and are localized in Afghanistan and Pakistan. The circulating vaccine-derived poliovirus (cVDPV) caused outbreaks in 32 countries in 2020. The cVDPV is a result of live oral poliovirus vaccine becoming infectious after extended circulation. This prompted an update to the Global Polio Eradication Initiative (GPEI) Strategy for the years 2022–2026. With the most recent update in August 2020, the WHO African Region was declared polio free leaving only one of the six WHO regions with polio. The GPEI's new initiatives focused on eradicating the WPV1 in both Afghanistan and Pakistan while also combating the new outbreaks of cVDPV. The difficulty arises when the world must not only eliminate the wild type polio virus but also the vaccine-derived form, making eradication even more complex. While both the live and inactivated polio vaccines were wildly successful in saving the world from the historic endemic, there still are drawbacks with each of the vaccines. The OPV vaccine was reverted to an infectious strain which led to the rise of the cVDPV. While the inactivated polio vaccine (IPV) protected the host, it was not strong enough to generate intestinal mucosa immunity and therefore did not prevent the transmission of the virus. These weaknesses suggest that more innovative vaccines or a combination of the two is needed to completely eradicate polio.

=== Swine flu vaccination ===
In 1918, the deadly H1N1 influenza virus which infected approximately 500 million people around the world and resulted in the deaths of 50 to 100 million people (3% to 5% of the world population). New York City had created two major mass immunization programs, the first was the smallpox immunization program initiated in 1947 and the second was the swine flu influenza program in 1976.

For the first mass immunization campaign in 1947, the New York City Department of Health maintained the outbreak within a period of 29 days and vaccinated 6.35 million people successfully. Weinstein and colleagues established vaccination clinics at many locations such as at the Department of Health's 125 Worth Street headquarters, at the 21 district health centers, 60 child health clinics, and 13 municipal hospitals in order to accommodate for the high demand of people requesting for a vaccination. The smallpox vaccination effort was announced to be officially terminated on May 3, 1947. In which case, it was rather surprising to see that the second mass immunization campaign in 1976, which was a national immunization effort, was only able to accomplish vaccinating 639,000 against swine influenza over a period of 60 days. It was also noted that in 1976, the mass swine flu vaccination programme was discontinued after 362 cases of Guillain–Barré syndrome were identified among 45 million vaccinated people. The vast differences between the number of people vaccinated in 1947 versus 1976, despite the outbreaks, are reflected mainly by the public's skeptical perception of the minimal severity and low threat of swine flu.

Swine flu, also known as H1N1 influenza A virus, is a type of infectious respiratory disease that has caused high economical and medical burden every year around the world. There are important lessons to be learned from the recent 'Swine Flu' pandemic. Improving techniques are necessary in trying to decrease the spread of infection-both in the community and within our hospitals would mean improving infection control and hygiene, and the use of masks, alcohol hand rubs and so on.

A worldwide study was conducted which comprehensively analyzed adamantanes resistance in H1N1 influenza viruses from 1918 to 2019 and showed 77.32% H1N1 influenza variants demonstrating resistance to adamantanes. This study emphasizes the importance of global surveillance, especially in many third-world countries, as well as the evolution of drug-resistant H1N1 influenza variants in an effort to prevent another pandemic.

== Contemporary usage ==
=== COVID-19 ===
The introduction of multiple COVID-19 vaccines throughout the pandemic such as Pfizer, Moderna, Johnson and Johnson, and the newly approved Novavax vaccine have helped allow large amounts of the population to get vaccinated.

When COVID-19 was identified in December 2019 there were no vaccines readily available to vaccinate mass populations. By December 2020, the Pfizer vaccine was the first to receive emergency use approval by the Food and Drug Administration. Vaccines under normal circumstances can take up to 10–15 years to be made and approved. Without worldwide collaboration, funding for research, and rigorous guidelines for clinical trials there would not have been a quickly developed vaccine.

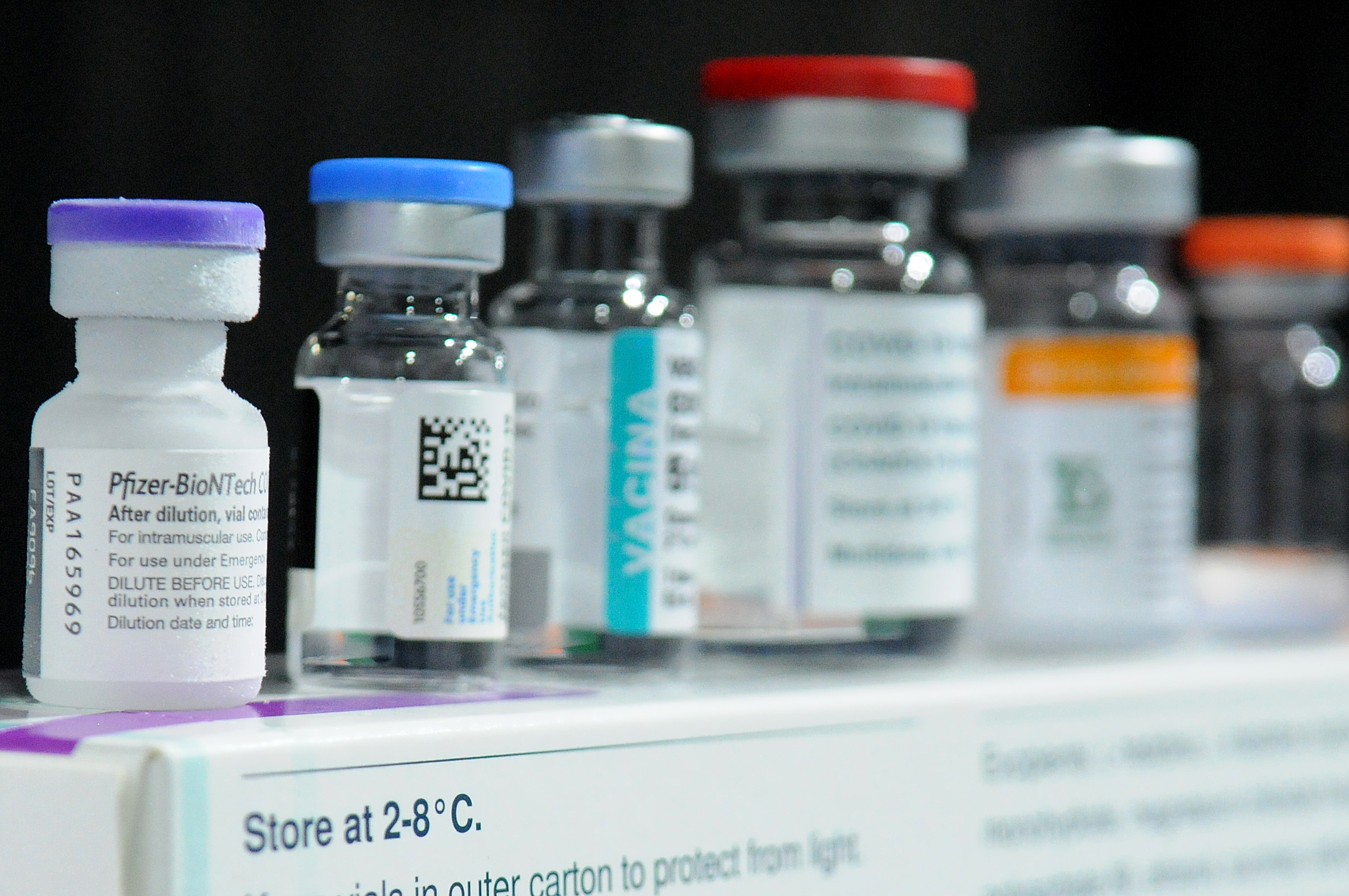
COVID-19 Vaccines

The type of vaccines that are available are messenger RNA, vector, and protein subunit. Messenger RNA vaccines work by giving cells specific instructions to make the S protein found on the surface of the COVID-19 virus. It does not infect recipients of the vaccine with the virus but allows for the body to detect and fight the COVID-19 virus. Both Pfizer and Moderna COVID-19 vaccines fall in to the messenger RNA category. Vector vaccines also deliver instructions on how to make the S protein found on the surface of the virus. It also does not cause the recipient to become infected with the virus after vaccination. The Johnson & Johnson vaccine falls into the vector category. Lastly the subunit vaccine only contains a part of the virus needed to create an immune response. The S protein is the harmless subunit that will allow for an immune response when the COVID-19 virus is detected. The Novavax vaccine falls into the subunit protein category.

When vaccinating large populations an action plan must be created to organize which groups will receive the vaccination first. The California Department of Public Health created an action plan to vaccinate by population group. First immunocompromised groups, second unvaccinated or not fully vaccinated, third under 12 populations, fourth boosters for those 65 and older, and lastly boosters for ages 12–64.

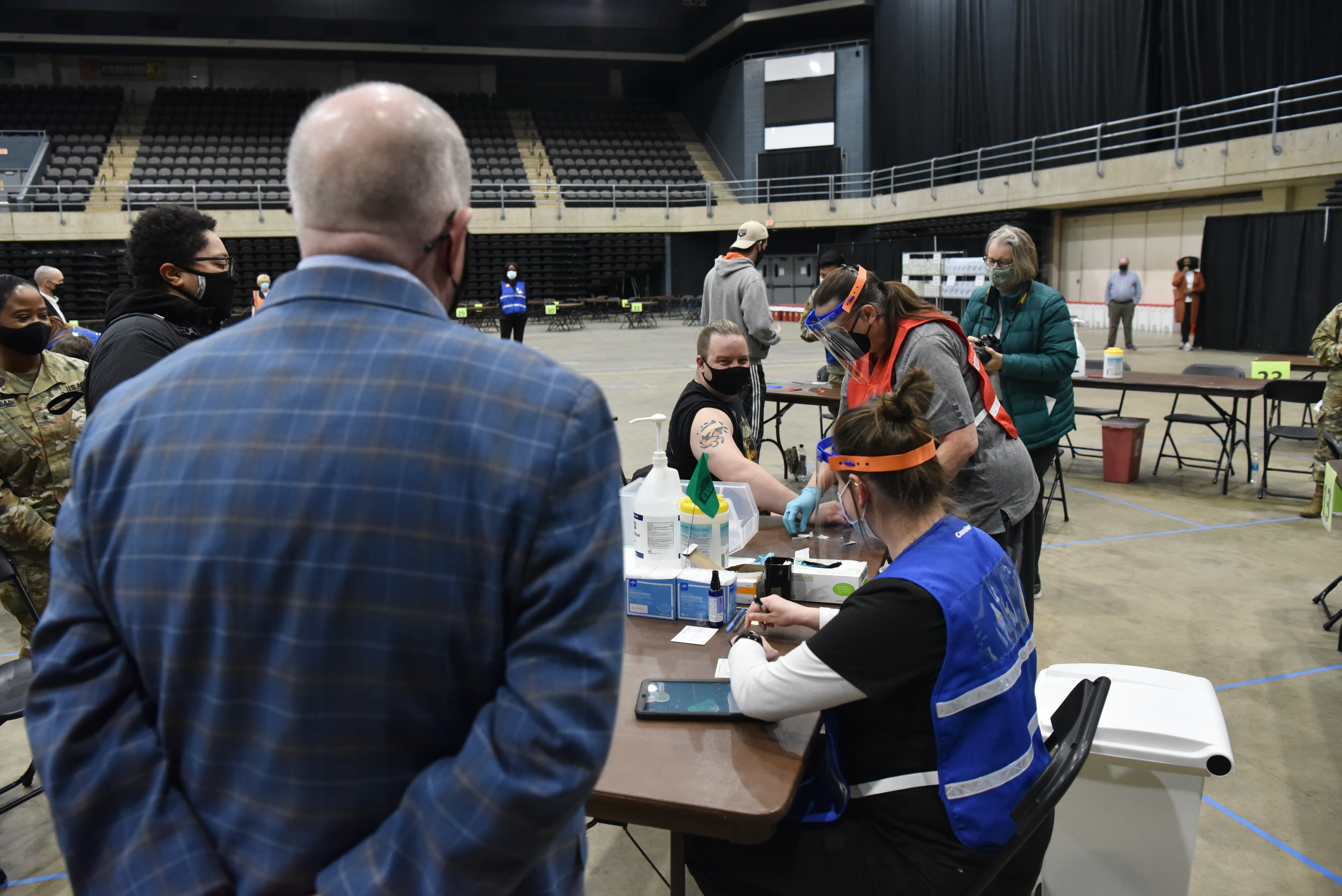
A mass vaccination site at a stadium in Salisbury, Maryland

As well as mass vaccination centers being established at many locations, such as stadiums led to many people getting vaccinated.

In the United States, NFL commissioner Roger Goodell offered the league's 30 stadiums as mass vaccination sites. As of April 2021, NFL stadiums have administered more than 2 million doses. By December 2021, more than 100,000 people had received vaccinations at Indianapolis Motor Speedway.

Pharmacist have also played an important role in getting mass populations vaccinated since they are a skilled and trained workforce able to help increase vaccination rates. Many people can turn to drug or convenience stores to get vaccinated since it can be a quick and easy place to access. Pharmacies have played a large roll in mass vaccination now more than ever due to the pandemic. Some states prior to the pandemic did not allow pharmacist to vaccinate or administer flu vaccines. Now, pharmacies are contracting with state and federal governments since they have become key players in vaccinations. Without the involvement of pharmacies mass vaccination would be difficult to achieve. in most communities 90% of people live within five miles of a pharmacy. Pharmacist can oftentimes be the quickest access to a healthcare provider, making it a desirable option for the public to come and get vaccinated.

Not only have pharmacist been involved in COVID-19 vaccinations but pharmacy technicians as well. Pharmacy technicians have helped alleviate the workload on pharmacist with the large increase in demand for vaccinations. They also can create more opportunities to interact with people who are hesitant in getting the COVID-19 vaccines. Pharmacy technicians can support pharmacist which will allow more vaccination services to be accommodated efficiently and safety. These efforts will allow for an increase in vaccinations and help vaccinate large groups at a time.

During the pandemic pharmacist have had a fundamental roll in sharing information about COVID-19 vaccines. Pharmacist are a quick resource for information and can help relieve some common concerns about reactions or misinformation to the vaccines. They are also advocates for getting vaccinated since they are educators and vaccine administrators. Sharing information to the public about COVID-19 vaccines can help increase vaccinations rates. Since pharmacist are easily accessible in the community setting they can help motivate or encourage getting vaccinated helping decrease preventable infections or diseases such as COVID-19.

Mass vaccination of COVID-19 vaccines is important to help stop the spread of the coronavirus and eventually end the pandemic. Individual governments have been allocating billions of dollars to increase production of vaccines to help with the current global manufacturing need of vaccines. Countries such as the United States, Canada, and Australia were able to receive many vaccines early on due to them being wealthier countries. They were able to receive many doses enough to vaccinate their own countries but this left other lower-income countries with limited supply of the vaccines. With some countries receiving more vaccines than others this leads to inequitable distribution and can increase the risk of new outbreaks. Without proper global vaccine distribution it will make it more difficult to end the pandemic and allow for mass vaccination as a global effort. Amid the new strains of the coronavirus such as the omicron variant, scientist and healthcare officials have raised concern about reduced effectiveness of available vaccines. In response to a concern about vaccines having reduced effectiveness countries have encouraged booster shots for most of their population. The World Health Organization would like to prioritize unvaccinated people over booster doses so more of the population will have received their initial dose.
