= Mary C. McLaughlin =

Health Commissioner of New York City

Mary C. McLaughlin (died 2014) was an American physician and public health official who served as the Commissioner of Health of the City of New York (May 28, 1969 until January 17, 1972). She left to become the commissioner of the Suffolk County Department of Health Services.

In 1947, McLaughlin began her career with the Department as a resident trainee. She went on to earn advanced degrees from Columbia University and New York University before returning as a district health officer in 1953, rising to become assistant commissioner for professional and community health services and associate deputy commissioner.

When McLaughlin became commissioner, budget cuts had taken their toll, leading to diminished clinic hours and cuts to the school health programs. Mayor John Lindsay was concerned about heroin addiction as both a health and crime problem so he directed McLaughlin to begin a citywide methadone program. As abortion was legalized in New York in July 1970, it was under her watch that abortion services were implemented. Other areas of focus included control of sexually transmitted diseases and lead poisoning.
