= Harry S. Mustard =

Henry Stoll Mustard (born Charleston, South Carolina, October 10, 1888; died Camden, South Carolina, August 5, 1966) was an American physician and public health pioneer.

== Early life ==
Mustard was the son of Allan Calvitte Mustard (1853-1906) and Caroline (Miscally) Mustard (1824-1924). He graduated from the College of Charleston and went on to receive his medical degree from the Medical College of South Carolina in 1911.

== Career ==
Mustard started his public health career with the United States Public Health Service in 1916. He left in 1923 to become health officer for Preston County, West Virginia.

In 1924 he was hired by the Commonwealth Fund to run a demonstration project - one of four nationwide - to improve child health in Rutherford County, Tennessee. Mustard quickly moved from an initial top-down approach to one that emphasized school-based programs. Combined with the Commonwealth Fund's financing of Rutherford Hospital, opened in 1927, Mustard revolutionized public health in Rutherford County; by 1930, two years after Mustard's 1928 departure, the American Public Health Association rated the county's public health system as the best in the nation among rural counties. Authorities in Tennessee were impressed enough with Mustard that he was appointed first as an assistant to the Commissioner of Public Health and then Assistant Commissioner of Public Health (1930).

After several years of teaching elsewhere, in 1932 Mustard joined the faculty of the Johns Hopkins School of Medicine and became the first director of the Eastern District of Baltimore, a special public health district centered on the medical school which was used for experimental and model public health programs. In 1934 Mustard moved to the New York University School of Medicine and then in 1940 became director of the Columbia University School of Public Health.

In 1947 Mustard took leave from the university to become the Commissioner of Health of the City of New York. Mustard strengthened district health offices, campaigned against air pollution and beach pollution, and instituted an educational campaign to reduce venereal disease. He also expanded nutrition and cancer-detection clinics, intensified the war on rats, and planned diagnostic clinics for diseases of the aged. Controversially, he imposed a limit of two dogs in an apartment. In 1949 Mustard returned to Columbia, teaching there until 1955

From 1950 to 1955 he also served as director of the State Charities Aid Association; he expanded efforts to raise health and welfare standards throughout New York state.

Mustard was the editor of the American Journal of Public Health from 1941 to 1944. He served as the president of the American Public Health Association in 1946. He also published a number of works on public health, including a popular textbook, An Introduction to Public Health (1937).

Mustard retired in 1956 and returned to South Carolina, making his home in Camden.

== Private life ==
Mustard married Sarah Hopkins (Haile) Mustard (1889-1980). They had three children: Dr. Harry Mustard, Jr. (1913-1963), Mary Boykin Mustard DuVal (1915-2009), and Elizabeth Haile Mustard Wooten (1920-2021). He is buried in Quaker Cemetery in Camden.
