= Shirley W. Wynne =

Former New York City Health Commissioner

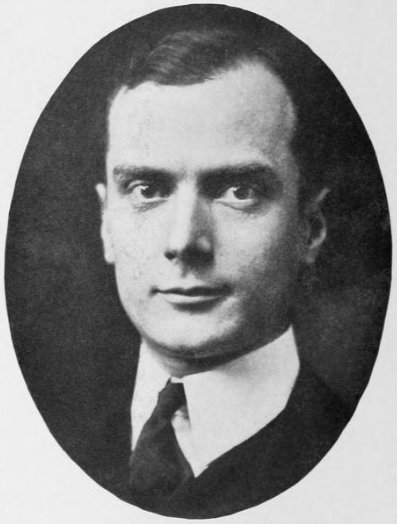

New York City Health Commissioner
- In office 1928–1933

Personal details
- Born: Shirley Wilmotte Wynne; 1882; New York, New York, US
- Died: April 19, 1942 (aged 59–60); New York, New York, US
- Resting place: Physician
- Education: College of Physicians and Surgeons; New York University

Shirley Wilmotte Wynne M.D., Dr. P.H. (1882–1942) was the New York City Health Commissioner from 1928 through 1933. He was considered "a leader in public health and child welfare initiatives throughout his career."

== Biography ==
Shirley W. Wynne was born in New York City in 1882. He graduated from the Columbia University College of Physicians and Surgeons in 1904, and earned a Doctor of Public Health degree from New York University in 1919.

He died at St. Luke's Hospital in Manhattan on April 19, 1942.
