= Mary T. Bassett =

American public health researcher

Mary Bassett
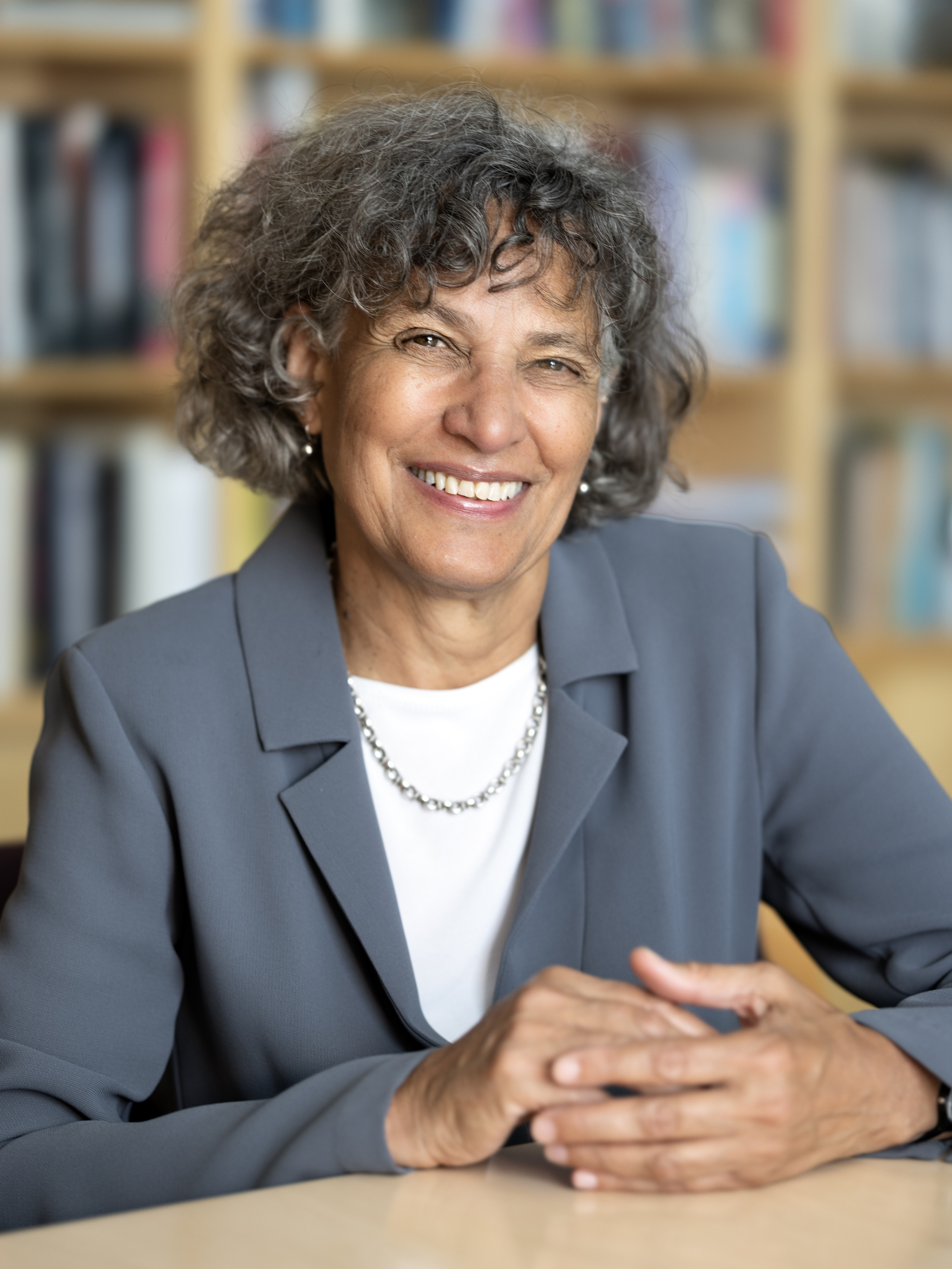

Commissioner of the New York State Department of Health
- In office December 1, 2021 – December 31, 2022
- Governor: Kathy Hochul
- Preceded by: Howard Zucker
- Succeeded by: James V. McDonald

Commissioner of the New York City Department of Health
- In office January 16, 2014 – August 31, 2018
- Mayor: Bill de Blasio
- Preceded by: Thomas Farley
- Succeeded by: Oxiris Barbot

Personal details
- Born: November 12, 1952 (age 73)
- Education: Harvard University (BA); Columbia University (MD); University of Washington (MPH)
- Awards: Calderone Prize (2016)

Mary Travis Bassett is an American physician and public health researcher. Bassett was the 17th Health Commissioner of the New York State Department of Health, serving from September 2021 to December 2022. From 2014 to 2018, she was the commissioner of the New York City Department of Health and Mental Hygiene.

Bassett is the former Director of the FXB Center for Health and Human Rights at Harvard University and the FXB Professor of the Practice of Health and Human Rights at the Harvard School of Public Health. She is also an associate professor of clinical epidemiology at the Columbia University Mailman School of Public Health.

== Early life and education ==
Bassett grew up in New York City and attended the Ethical Culture Fieldston School. Her parents were Dr. Emmett W. Bassett, a chemist with a PhD in dairy technology from the Tuskegee Institute and the first African American investigator in the field, and Priscilla Bassett, a white librarian and activist. Bassett identifies as African American. Bassett received her B.A. in history and science from Harvard University in 1974, her M.D. from the Columbia University College of Physicians and Surgeons in 1979, and her MPH in Health Services (Health Policy Research) from the University of Washington in 1985. She completed her medical residency at Harlem Hospital Center.

== Career ==
Bassett lived in Zimbabwe from 1985 to 2002, during which time she served on the medical faculty of the University of Zimbabwe. She was appointed deputy commissioner of Health Promotion and Disease Prevention at the New York City Department of Health and Mental Hygiene in 2002. Beginning in 2009, she served as the program director for the Doris Duke Charitable Foundation's African Health Initiative.

In January 2014, she was appointed by New York City mayor Bill de Blasio to serve as New York City Health Commissioner. Since being appointed to this position, which was the largest she had ever held, she helped lead the city's response to the Ebola virus cases in the United States that were first reported in the fall of 2014. She also addressed New Yorkers regarding outbreaks of Legionnaires' disease in their city. In February 2015, she wrote a perspective piece in the New England Journal of Medicine regarding the adverse health effects of racial discrimination against African Americans.

In November 2015, Bassett gave a TEDMED talk, "Why your doctor should care about social justice." In this talk, Bassett spoke about witnessing the AIDS epidemic firsthand in Zimbabwe and setting up a clinic to treat and educate people about the virus. However, Bassett said she regrets not speaking out against structural inequities during her time in Zimbabwe. Bassett said these same structural problems exist in the United States today, and as New York City's Health Commissioner, she would use every chance she had to rally support for health equity and speak out against racism.

In 2016, Bassett was awarded the Frank A. Calderone Prize by the Mailman School of Public Health. This prize was established in 1986, and is the most prestigious honor in the field of public health in the United States.

In 2017, Bassett was elected to become a member of the National Academy of Medicine. She was succeeded as New York City Health Commissioner by Oxiris Barbot in 2018. In September 2018, Bassett became director of the François-Xavier Bagnoud Center for Health and Human Rights (FXB Center) at the Harvard T.H. Chan School of Public Health.

=== New York State Health Commissioner (2021–2023) ===
In September 2021, New York Governor Kathy Hochul appointed Bassett as the Commissioner of the New York State Department of Health, succeeding Howard Zucker. She assumed office on 1 December 2021, taking a leave of absence from Harvard.

Shortly after taking office, Bassett issued a memo regarding the distribution of scarce COVID-19 therapeutics. The guidance noted that "non-white race or Hispanic/Latino ethnicity should be considered a risk factor" for severe illness. This inclusion sparked legal challenges, including a lawsuit by Cornell Law Professor William A. Jacobson arguing the guidance constituted racial discrimination. The case was ultimately dismissed for lack of standing, though the court noted that a patient who had actually been denied treatment based on the guidance might have had a successful claim.

Bassett resigned from the position effective 1 January 2023, stating her desire to return to her work at Harvard.

=== Return to Harvard (2023–2025) ===
Bassett returned to her role as Director of the FXB Center at Harvard in January 2023. During this period, the Center expanded its "Palestine Program for Health and Human Rights." Under Bassett's leadership, the program focused on the health impacts of the situation in Palestine, in particular working together with Birzeit University to study the impact of the Israeli occupation on early childhood health in the West Bank.

The Center's programming faced scrutiny. In April 2025, a report by Harvard's Presidential Task Force on Antisemitism and Anti-Israeli Bias criticized the FXB Center, alleging that some of its academic programming presented a "demonizing view" of Israel. Former Harvard leader Larry Summers opposed the cooperation with Birzeit University.

=== Removal from FXB Center (2025) ===
On December 9, 2025, Bassett was asked to resign as director of the FXB Center and told to empty her office by the end of 2025, and an effective termination date of January 9, 2026. The forced resignation was announced by Dean Andrea A. Baccarelli, who stated that the center would undergo a "strategic pivot" to focus on children's health and early development.

The decision drew significant attention. More than 400 university affiliates signed a petition calling for her reinstatement, describing the removal as politically motivated and linking it to the center's focus on Palestine. While Harvard officials did not publicly cite political complaints as the reason for the change, The New York Times noted that the departure followed a period of intense pressure regarding the university's handling of campus activism and the Task Force's earlier criticism of the center's Palestine Program.

== Select publications ==
- Zinzi D Bailey; Nancy Krieger; Madina Agénor; Jasmine Graves; Natalia Linos; Mary T Bassett (1 April 2017). "Structural racism and health inequities in the USA: evidence and interventions". The Lancet. 389 (10077): 1453–1463. doi:10.1016/S0140-6736(17)30569-X. ISSN 0140-6736. PMID 28402827.
- Mary Travis Bassett; Jarvis T Chen; Nancy Krieger (20 October 2020). "Variation in racial/ethnic disparities in COVID-19 mortality by age in the United States: A cross-sectional study". PLOS Medicine. 17 (10) e1003402. doi:10.1371/JOURNAL.PMED.1003402. ISSN 1549-1277. PMC 7575091. PMID 33079941.
- Cowger, Tori L.; Murray, Eleanor J.; Clarke, Jaylen; Bassett, Mary T.; Ojikutu, Bisola O.; Sánchez, Sarimer M.; Linos, Natalia; Hall, Kathryn T. (2022-11-24). "Lifting Universal Masking in Schools — Covid-19 Incidence among Students and Staff". New England Journal of Medicine. 387 (21): 1935–1946. doi:10.1056/NEJMoa2211029. ISSN 0028-4793. PMC 9743802. PMID 36351262.
- Kunichoff, Dennis; Mills, David; Asi, Yara; Abdulrahim, Sawsan; Wispelwey, Bram; Tanous, Osama; Ahmed, A. Kayum; Hammoudeh, Weeam; Bahour, Nadine; Bassett, Mary T.; Greenough, P. Gregg (2024). "Are hospitals collateral damage? Assessing geospatial proximity of 2000 lb bomb detonations to hospital facilities in the Gaza Strip from October 7 to November 17, 2023". PLOS Global Public Health. 4 (10) e0003178. doi:10.1371/journal.pgph.0003178. PMC 11466298. PMID 39387878.
- Krieger, Nancy; Bassett, Mary T. (2025). "Structural and Scientific Racism, Science, and Health — Evidence versus Ideology". New England Journal of Medicine. 393 (12): 1145–1148. doi:10.1056/NEJMp2508916. PMID 40981758.

Government offices
Preceded by Thomas A. Farley	Commissioner of Health of the City of New York; 2014–2018	Succeeded by Oxiris Barbot
