= Howard Zucker =

New York State Commissioner of Health

Howard A. Zucker

Commissioner of the New York State Department of Health
- In office 2015–2021
- Governor: Andrew Cuomo; Kathy Hochul
- Preceded by: Nirav R. Shah
- Succeeded by: Mary T. Bassett

Personal details
- Born: September 6, 1959 (age 66) Bronx, New York, U.S.
- Education: McGill University (B.S.); George Washington University School of Medicine & Health Sciences (M.D.); Fordham University Law School (J.D.); Columbia University Law School (LL.M); London School of Hygiene & Tropical Medicine
- Occupation: Medical administrator
- Profession: Physician

Howard A. Zucker (born 6 September 1959) is a U.S. physician and lawyer.

== Education ==
Zucker was born in the Bronx in 1959. He received a BS from McGill University. While at McGill, he helped design zero-gravity medical experiments that were later performed on several Space Shuttle missions. At the age of 22, he received his medical degree from the George Washington University School of Medicine & Health Sciences, making him at the time one of the youngest doctors in the United States. He trained in pediatrics at Johns Hopkins Hospital, anesthesiology at the Hospital of the University of Pennsylvania, pediatric cardiology at Children's Hospital Boston/Harvard Medical School, and pediatric critical care medicine and anesthesiology at The Children's Hospital of Philadelphia.

== Career ==
During the presidency of George W. Bush, Zucker was a White House Fellow and later Deputy Assistant Secretary of Health in the Department of Health and Human Services under Tommy Thompson. During that time, he worked on public health preparedness, regenerative medicine, the anthrax crisis, and preventive public health strategies. He also developed the Medical Reserve Corps. Afterward he served as the assistant Director-General of the World Health Organization.

From 2013 to 2014, Zucker served as the First Deputy Commissioner of the New York State Department of Health. From 2014 to 2015, he served as Acting Commissioner after the abrupt resignation of Nirav Shah. From 2015 to 2021, he served as the 16th commissioner of the New York State Department of Health. He was appointed to the position by Governor Andrew Cuomo. During the COVID-19 pandemic, he appeared frequently in media as the ultimate expert on the status of the pandemic in the State of New York. In January 2021, the New York Attorney General’s office released a report showing that the New York Department of Health under-counted statewide nursing home deaths by as much as 50%. Both Governor Cuomo and Zucker were blamed for the under-count.

From 2023 to 2024, Zucker served as the deputy director for Global Health at the CDC.

== Publications ==
- Howard Zucker, M.D., "Where Have All the Doctors Gone? Physicians quitting medicine: It's a crisis that's shaking our health care system. Here's how you can protect yourself", AARP Bulletin, vol. 66, no. 1 (January/February 2025), pp. 7–8, 10–12, 14–15. "The current shortage of physicians, combined with a number of other factors, has placed such an intense strain on doctors that many ... are choosing to [p. 8] switch professions or ... retire early. ... In 1980, a U.S. government report [had] predicted a surplus of 70,000 physicians by 1990... In response, medical schools [had] established what became a 25-year moratorium on increasing class size... [Meanwhile, since 1980 the U.S. population has grown by] 110 million. By 2005, as the ... potential for a severe physician shortage emerged, [medical-school class sizes were increased. Nevertheless, by 2036] a shortage of up to 86,000 physicians [is predicted]. Becoming a doctor is expensive. ... Two-thirds of newly minted doctors are choosing to become specialists, which allows them ... salaries ... twice what a primary care physician ... make[s]. [Yet m]any people ... are required to see a [primary care physician] before they can [see] specialists... [Moreover] 50 percent of medical students and residents surveyed preferred to pursue careers that do not involve direct patient care, such as research or teaching... One in 4 contemplate dropping out of medical school altogether, citing overwork, financial stress and mental health concerns. ... Part of what's driving [medical-student and physician dissatisfaction] is the growing trend of private equity firms ... purchasing hospitals ... private [medical] practices ... home health centers and surgival centers. [In 2024 almost] 80 percent of all doctors were employed by hospitals or corporations... [Such] for-profit ... corporate entities [seek to maximize their profits and] often allow... just 15 minutes per [patient] visit, a situation that isn't healthy for either the doctor or the patient. [p. 10] And then there's the paperwork. For every hour seeing patients, the average doctor now spends two hours doing administrative tasks... A primary driver of paperwork: the electronic health record. ... [I]ts primary focus is documenting for regulators and billing for insurers. [p. 11] [Thus it is increasingly difficult for people to find a physician who is accepting new patients, especially within the patient's home area, while m]ore than 300 [harried] doctors now [annually] suicide, a rate twice that of the general population." (p. 12.)

== See also ==
- Healthcare in the United States
- Healthcare reform in the United States
