= Willard Parker Hospital =

Former hospital in New York City

Coordinates: 40°43′46″N 73°58′23″W

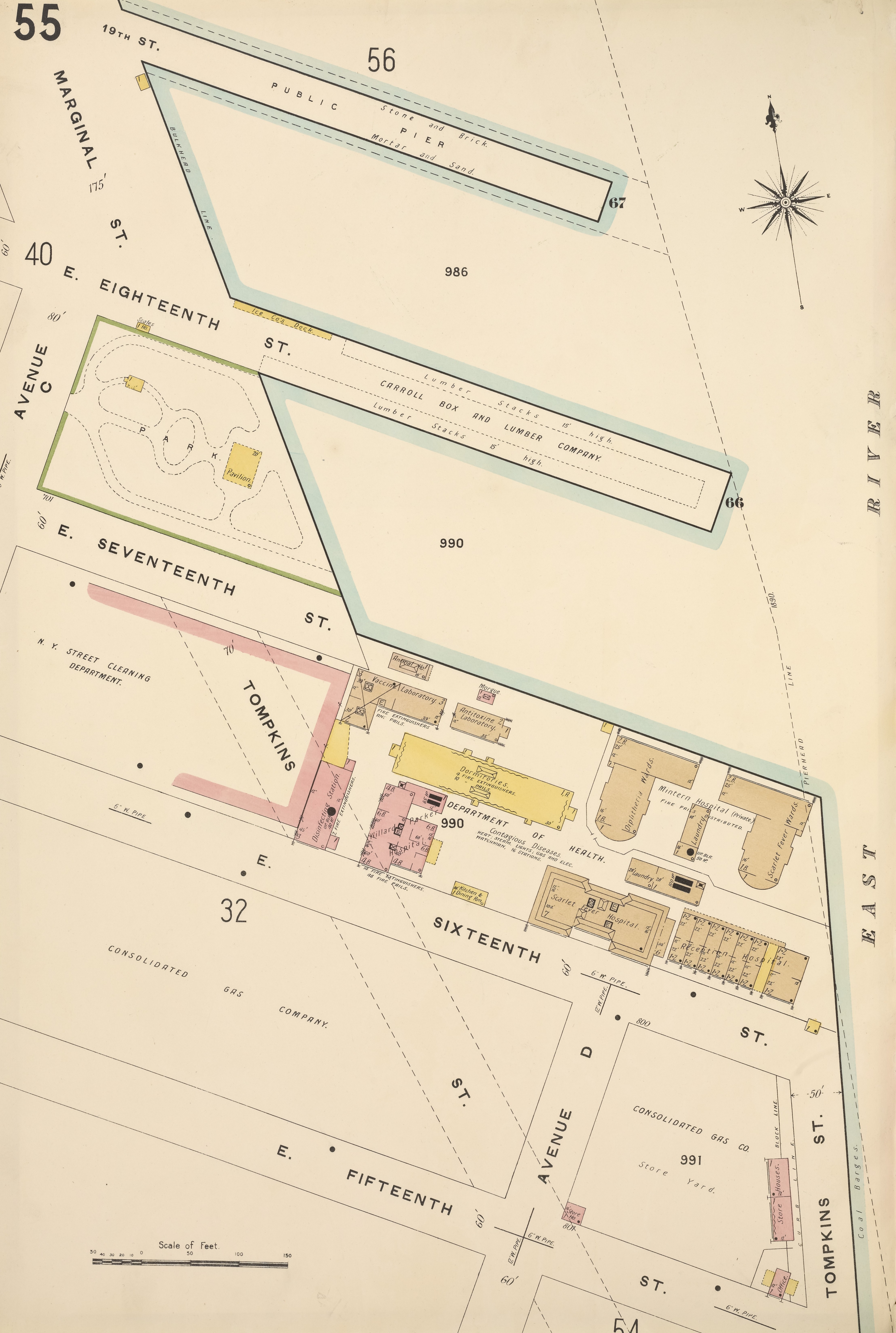
Willard Parker Hospital and its neighborhood on a map published in 1903

The Willard Parker Hospital (1885–1955) for communicable diseases was located on East 16th Street along the East River in New York City. It was founded by the City of New York in 1885. It was named after Willard Parker, a prominent physician and surgeon, who at the time was a member of the Citizens' Association which called for the state legislature to establish an independent city health department. Parker later became the Vice President of the first New York City Board of Health.

== History ==
At the time of its opening, there were only two other hospitals in New York City, Bellevue Hospital and New York Hospital, now called Old New York Hospital and formerly known as Broadway Hospital. It initially opened wards for the care of patients with scarlet fever and measles. Within a year, a renovation of the building allowed the inclusion of a diphtheria ward.

In 1913, funds were raised for a new building along the same location. The hospital became a teaching resource in infectious diseases for area medical and nursing schools. In 1918, it was on the frontlines of the city's response to the 1918 Spanish Flu pandemic, treating hundreds of sick sailors from the US Navy, as well as civilians.

In 1928, the hospital opened its own school of nursing, a 32-month program that awarded a diploma in nursing and qualified the graduates to sit for state licensing examinations granting Registered Nurse licensure.

Philip Zimbardo was quarantined at the hospital for a six-month period beginning in November 1938 after he developed double pneumonia and whooping cough. During his stay at the hospital, Zimbardo learned to read and write from comic books.

The hospital closed in 1955 due to a lack of patients.

In 1960, Con Edison acquired the site at an auction of city-owned parcels and intended to use the property as a future expansion of the East River Generating Station. The sale of land had to be subsequently authorized by the New York State Legislature after it was determined that part of the property had once been land under water.

== See also ==
- 1947 New York City smallpox outbreak
- List of hospitals in New York City
- List of hospitals in Manhattan
