= Michelle E. Morse =

American internist

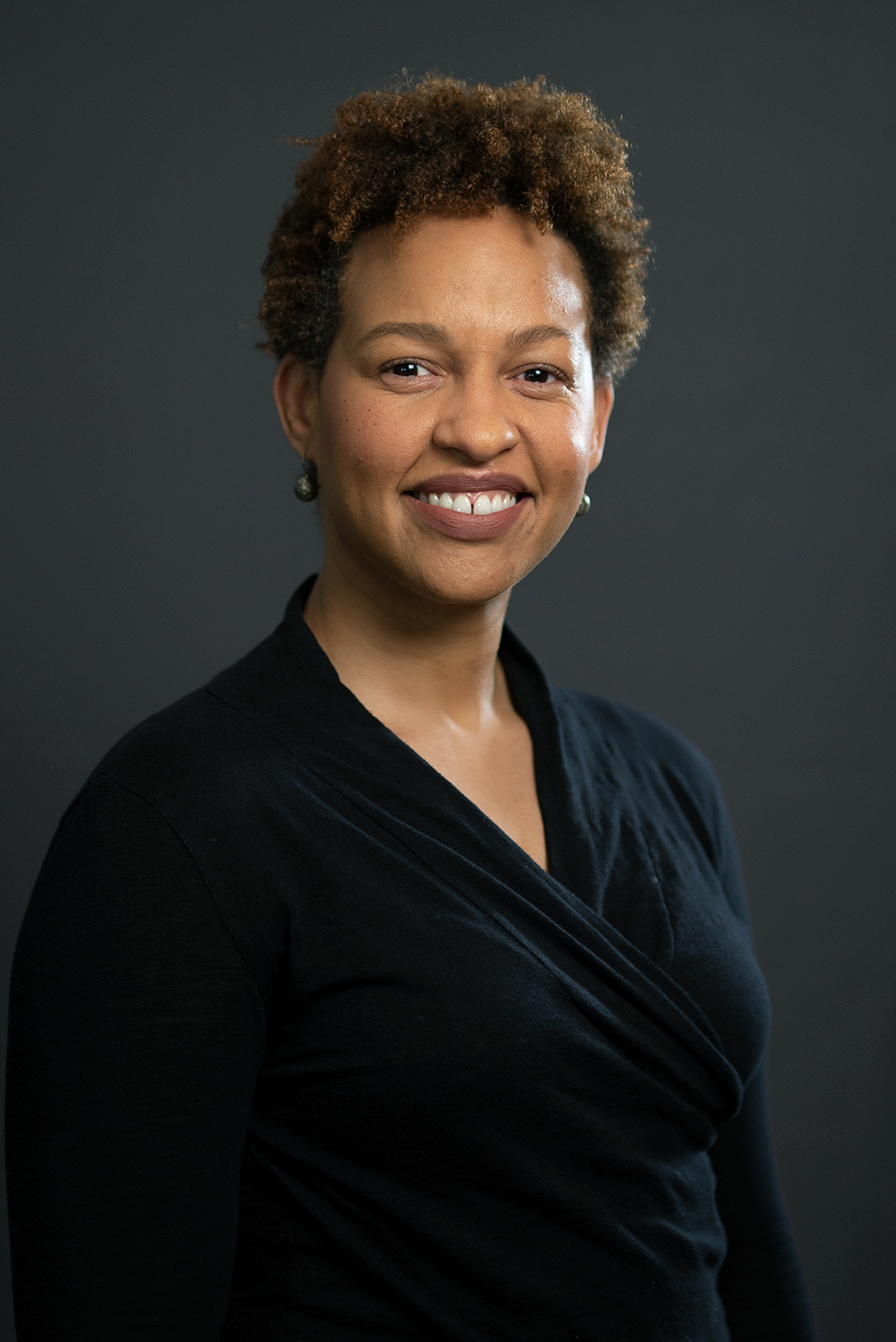

Commissioner of the New York City Department of Health
- Acting; October 19, 2024 – January 30, 2026
- Mayor: Eric Adams
- Preceded by: Ashwin Vasan
- Succeeded by: Alister Martin

Personal details
- Born: Philadelphia, Pennsylvania, U.S.
- Education: University of Virginia (BS); Perelman School of Medicine at the University of Pennsylvania (MD); Harvard T.H. Chan School of Public Health (MPH)

Michelle Evelyn Morse is an American internist. She is an assistant professor at Harvard Medical School/Brigham and Women's Hospital and co-founded EqualHealth and Social Medicine Consortium. She was the interim Commissioner of Health for the City of New York under Eric Adams.

== Early life and education ==
Morse was raised in Philadelphia, Pennsylvania, to a public school teacher. Morse earned her Bachelor of Arts degree in French in 2003 from the University of Virginia and her medical degree from the Perelman School of Medicine at the University of Pennsylvania in 2008. In medical school at the University of Pennsylvania, she had her first exposure to global health when she worked in a pediatric clinic in Guatemala. Morse also took a year off from medical school to conduct research on tuberculosis in Botswana. Following this, she received a Master's in Public Health from the Harvard School T.H. Chan School of Public Health in 2012.

== Career ==
=== Healthcare achievements ===
As part of her residency training, Morse worked several months per year in the Partners in Health-supported hospital in Lascahobas, Haiti, during which she realized she had more formal training than all of her Haitian colleagues. As a result, she co-founded EqualHealth in 2011, a non-governmental organisation that "aims to inspire and support the development of Haiti's next generation of healthcare leaders through improving medical and nursing education and creating opportunities for growth amongst health professionals." Some of the activism Morse is involved with through EqualHealth includes the Campaign Against Racism that she co-founded with Camara Jones, past president of the American Public Health Association. It is a network of 23 chapters in 10 countries, with 250 active members, "uncovering racial capitalism and reimagining a future where sociocultural, political and economic systems work towards health equity, rather than against it." These efforts were supported by a $100,000 grant from the Soros Equality Fellowship in 2018.

Following this collaboration, Morse served as deputy chief medical officer for Partners in Health (PiH) from 2012 to 2016 and served as the director of medical education and the advisor to the medical director of Hôpital Universitaire de Mirebalais in Haiti. While serving in her role as deputy CMO, Morse also co-founded Medicine Consortium, a global coalition that advocates, educates, and conducts research using the lens of social medicine so that health professional education can more honestly align with the root causes of illness.

In 2013, Morse worked to open and operate a 300-bed teaching hospital in Mirebalais, Haiti, and launched the first three residency training programs at the hospital. Upon returning to North America and completing her Master's in Public Health from the Harvard T.H. Chan School of Public Health, Morse also assumed the position of Assistant Program Director for the Internal Medicine residency program at Brigham and Women’s Hospital. While serving in her role as Deputy CMO in 2015, Morse also co-founded Social Medicine Consortium with Michael Westerhaus, a physician. The consortium is a global coalition with the stated aim of advocating, educating, and conducting research using the lens of social medicine. She later worked as a Clinical Instructor and then an assistant professor at Harvard Medical School.

=== Health policy contributions ===
Morse has also worked in the area of health policy. From September 2019 to January 2021, she served as one of the six professionals selected as a Robert Wood Johnson Health Policy and worked with the Ways and Means Committee, Majority Staff, in the U.S. House of Representatives. Following this, she also published Creating Real Change at Academic Medical Centers - How Social Movements Can Be Timely Catalysts to describe her work on heart failures.

In February 2021, Morse was made the first chief medical officer of the New York City Department of Health and Mental Hygiene and succeeded Torian Easterling as head of the Center for Health Equity and Community Wellness. Health Commissioner Dave A. Chokshi, a physician, said Morse's experience combined the "best of public health, social medicine, anti-racism education, and activism.” Her primary role as chief medical officer is addressing gaps between public health (and the Department) and the healthcare sector. She oversees CHECW's work to understand health inequities and end disparities relating to premature mortality, racial inequity, and chronic disease, among others. Having previously published on medical racism in the United States,

The next month, in March 2021, Morse co-authored an op-ed with Bram Wispelwey on that topic in the Boston Review. In the article, Morse argued in favor of federal reparations. She also advocated for preferential treatment of Black and Latinx patients admitted with heart failure exacerbations. Her writing received criticism from researcher Christopher Rufo for being a "moral crime and unconstitutional." Health equity leaders David A. Ansell, Brittani James and Fernando G. De Maio published a related piece in the New England Journal of Medicine, writing, "This effort is not about race-preferential treatment, as the neo-Nazis and others on the political right have claimed, but about eliminating obstacles to care that harm systematically excluded populations." Global health leaders Paul Farmer, Sheila Davis, and Ophelia Dahl of Partners In Health supported Morse's and her co-author's analysis in the Boston Review, writing, "Over the past decade, Morse and Wispelwey, in particular, put heart and soul into addressing deficiencies in the medical system in the United States and medical systems around the world."

In June 2022, a Smithsonian Channel series, "Cyclebreakers," featured Morse for her work serving communities that have been traditionally excluded from healthcare access in the United States, as well as Botswana, Haiti and Guatemala. The eight-minute video was posted to the Smithsonian Channel's social media accounts, including TikTok.

As New York City's first chief medical officer, Morse played a pivotal role in dismantling a decades-long reliance on a racially biased algorithm for kidney function estimation that disproportionately affected Black patients, leading to inadequate treatment and prolonged transplant waits. Starting 2021, she oversaw a transformation, convincing major hospital networks including Northwell Health to abandon the algorithm. Her leadership through the Coalition to End Racism in Clinical Algorithms has not only focused on kidney-related issues but also addressed disparities in areas such as unnecessary C-sections for Black and Hispanic pregnant women.

On October 21, 2024 Morse became Commissioner of the Department of Health of New York City on an interim basis, replacing Ashwin Vasan, who had resigned. She was replaced with Alister Martin under the Mamdani administration.

== Awards and recognition ==
- 40 under 40 Leaders In Health Award by the National Minority Quality Forum in 2018.
- Excellence in Humanitarian Services award by the Society of Hospital Medicine in 2018.
- Soros Equality Fellowship in 2018.
- George W. Thorn Award by Brigham and Women's Hospital Department of Medicine in 2019. Morse is the first black woman to receive this highest clinic education honour offered by the Brigham and Women's Hospital Department of Medicine.
