= Israel Weinstein =

American physician and bacteriologist

- Born: May 26, 1893; Manhattan, New York City, New York
- Died: May 25, 1975 (aged 81); Brooklyn, New York City, New York
- Education: City College of New York; Columbia University; New York University
- Known for: Commissioner of Health of the City of New York, Bacteriologist, vaccination campaign during the 1947 New York City smallpox outbreak
- Scientific career
- Fields: Public health, bacteriology
- Workplaces: Morris High School, New York Public Lecture Bureau, New York Botanical Garden, Columbia University, New York University School of Medicine, Bellevue Hospital, Metropolitan Hospital, Union College, Montefiore Medical Center, Sea View Hospital,

Israel Weinstein (May 26, 1893 – May 25, 1975) was an American physician and bacteriologist, best known for his work in public health in New York City, especially during the 1947 New York City smallpox outbreak as the Commissioner of Health of the City of New York from March 13, 1946, to November 3, 1947, under Mayor William O'Dwyer.

== Early life and education ==
Israel Weinstein was born in New York City, New York, on March 26, 1893, the fourth of seven children of David Weinstein and Freida nee Shostakowsky, recent Jewish immigrants from Brest, Russia (now Belarus). He was raised in a tenement building on the Lower East Side of New York City, and later in the Bronx. As a child, he experienced the death of two of his younger siblings from pneumonia, and he lost his father to heart disease in 1920 when he was only 27.

Weinstein graduated with his Bachelor of Arts from City College of New York in 1913, followed by a masters in 1915 at Columbia University, in 1917 he received his D.Sc from New York University.

== Career ==
During his initial days, he was employed as a biology teacher at Morris High School in the Bronx from 1914 to 1922.

Weinstein lectured on medical and scientific topics for the New York City Department of Health, the New York Public Lecture Bureau, the New York Botanical Gardens from 1920 to 1928. He worked as an instructor of physiology and at Columbia University from 1929 to 1931. He also worked as an assistant professor of bacteriology and hygiene from 1931 to 1934 and an assistant professor of preventive medicine from 1934 to 1939 at New York University.

Weinstein published Extracts of Antibodies Obtained from Specific Precipitates of Typhoid-Antityphoid Serum Complex in the Journal of Immunology in 1918, Quantitative Biological Effects of Monochromatic Ultraviolet Light in the Journal of the Optical Society of America in 1930, Bacteriological Study of Throats in Rheumatic and Non-Rheumatic Fever: With Special Reference to Hemolytic Streptococci in JAMA Internal Medicine in 1934, and An Outbreak of Smallpox in New York City, about the 1947 New York City smallpox outbreak, among others.

=== Medical career ===
In 1917, Weinstein joined the United States Army as a first lieutenant. He served in the Army Expedition Force, seeing action during the Battle of Saint-Mihiel. However, he was specifically tasked as a public health expert, producing his first public health campaign, directed at soldiers in order to reduce venereal diseases.

Upon the end of World War One and the completion of his medical degree, in addition to working as a public health lecturer, Weinstein also served as a surgeon on the house staff of Bellevue Hospital from 1926 to 1928, and later an assistant physician in the outpatient department at the same institution from 1929 to 1930. He was a visiting attending physician at Metropolitan Hospital Center from 1928 to 1929, an adjunct visiting physician at Montefiore Medical Center from 1931 to 1934, and an attending bacteriologist at Sea View Hospital from 1934 to 1939.

During the onset of World War II, he once again joined the Army and was tasked with conducting public health lectures. Shortly after his discharge from the Army after the war, he was appointed to the position of New York City Health Commissioner.

== Commissioner of Health of the City of New York ==
In May 1946 Weinstein was appointed as the Commissioner of Health of the City of New York by Mayor William O'Dwyer. Within two days of his appointment Weinstein started work on cleaning up the Marcy Houses projects in Brooklyn and even left his 53rd birthday celebration in order to close a contaminated cannery at Camp LaGuardia.

=== 1947 Smallpox Outbreak ===
In 1947, New York City experienced its first smallpox outbreak since 1912. Weinstein went to Mayor William O'Dwyer to personally request $500,000 for the purchase of additional vaccine doses and to expand his staff for the campaign, which became the largest in American history. Within three weeks over 6,350,000 New Yorkers had been vaccinated against the disease, 5,000,000 of whom were vaccinated within the first two weeks. In the end, only 12 people had contracted smallpox, only two of whom died.

During the period 1900 to 1929, epidemics of virulent smallpox were reported throughout the United States. Notable among these were the outbreaks in 1921 in Denver and Kansas City, when the former city reported 924 cases and 37 deaths, and the latter 943 cases and 160 deaths. In 1924, Detroit reported 1,610 cases and 163 deaths. In 1901, an epidemic of smallpox in New York City resulted in 1,959 cases and 410 deaths. Had the same rate prevailed in the 1947 outbreak, there would have been 4,310 cases and 902 deaths.

— Dr. Israel Weinstein, "An Outbreak of Smallpox in New York City"

Weinstein served as health commissioner for seven more months, resigning on November 3 due to "personality conflicts" and "jealousy from those above him due to his flamboyant nature and frequent news appearances". He would go on to serve as the director of the Bureau of Health Education until 1949 when he retired.

== Later life ==
Weinstein would go on to lecture occasionally internationally, but never married and had no children; his parents and five of his six siblings predeceased him. Weinstein died on May 25, 1975, in Brooklyn.
