= Commissioner of Health of the City of New York =

New York City political appointee

- Incumbent; Alister Martin since January 31, 2026; 9 months ago
- New York City Department of Health and Mental Hygiene
- Style: Doctor
- Member of: Government of New York City
- Reports to: New York City Deputy Mayor, Health and Human Services
- Appointer: Mayor of New York City
- Term length: At the pleasure of the mayor
- Constituting instrument: New York City Charter
- Formation: April 27, 1870; 156 years ago
- First holder: Joseph Bosworth
- Unofficial names: New York City Health Commissioner
- Website: /www1.nyc.gov/site/doh/about/about-doh/the-commissioner.page

The commissioner of health of the City of New York is the head of the city's Department of Health and Mental Hygiene. The commissioner is appointed by the Mayor of New York City, and also serves on the city's Board of Health with the chairperson of the Department's Mental Hygiene Advisory Board and nine other members appointed by the mayor.

== History ==
The Metropolitan Board of Health, which was the predecessor agency to the Department of Health and consisted of sanitary and vital statistics bureaus, had its first meeting on March 5, 1866. The modern Department of Health, under a single commissioner, was formed by the New York City Charter revision pursuant to Chapter 137 of the Laws of 1870 passed by the New York State legislature. In the early years after its formation, commissioners were sometimes political appointments, with no experience in medicine or related fields. In 2002, the Department of Health was merged with the Department of Mental Health, Mental Retardation and Alcoholism Services to form the Department of Health and Mental Hygiene.

== Qualifications ==
City regulations currently require that the commissioner of health must be a doctor of medicine, and have either

- an M.P.H. degree, an M.B.A. or M.P.A. degree with concentration in the health field, or an equivalent degree and at least five years' teaching experience in college or university public health teaching, or
- at least five years' experience in public health administration.

== Duties ==
According to the New York City Charter, the commissioner is broadly responsible for preparing plans for construction and operation of medical and health care facilities and establishing their priorities, has the power to compel the testimony of witnesses and produce reports and documents in matters regarding health, and assess penalties up to $1,000 for violations or failures to comply with health notices or regulations. These duties involve regulating and overseeing matters ranging from reportable contagious diseases, to registration of birth and deaths, restaurant inspections, selling food from carts, selling tobacco products to minors and monitoring of smoking in public areas, regulation of wild animals, and sending health alerts to the public and doctors.

== List of commissioners of health of the City of New York ==
List of commissioners of health of the City of New York
	Name	Dates in office	Mayoral administration
1	Joseph Bosworth	April 27, 1870 – May 8, 1873	Abraham Oakey Hall
2	Charles F. Chandler, Ph.D.	May 8, 1873 – June 12, 1883	William F. Havemeyer, Samuel B. H. Vance, William H. Wickham, Smith Ely, Jr., Edward Cooper, William Russell Grace, Franklin Edson
3	Alexander Shaler	June 13, 1883 – March 7, 1887	Franklin Edson, William Russell Grace, Abram S. Hewitt
	vacant	March 7, 1887 – March 14, 1887	Abram S. Hewitt
4	James C. Bayles	March 14, 1887 – May 1889	Abram S. Hewitt, Hugh J. Grant
5	Charles G. Wilson	May 1889 – January 1, 1898	Hugh J. Grant, Thomas F. Gilroy, William L. Strong
6	Nathan Straus	January 1, 1898 – March 3, 1898	Robert Van Wyck
7	Michael Cotter Murphy	March 3, 1898 – February 22, 1901	Robert Van Wyck
8	John B. Sexton	February 22, 1901 – January 1, 1902	Robert Van Wyck
9	Ernst J. Lederle, Ph.D.	January 1, 1902 – January 1, 1904	Seth Low
10	Thomas Darlington, M.D.	January 1, 1904 – January 9, 1910	George B. McClellan, Jr.
11	Ernst J. Lederle, Ph.D.	January 9, 1910 – January 19, 1914	William J. Gaynor, Ardolph L. Kline
12	Sigismund Schulz Goldwater, M.D.	January 19, 1914 – November 1, 1915	John P. Mitchel
13	Haven Emerson, M.D.	November 1, 1915 – January 15, 1918	John P. Mitchel
14	J. Lewis Amster, M.D.	January 15, 1918 – April 29, 1918	John F. Hylan
15	Royal S. Copeland, M.D.	April 29, 1918 – March 7, 1923	John F. Hylan
16	Frank J. Monaghan, M.D.	March 7, 1923 – January 1, 1926	John F. Hylan
17	Louis I. Harris, M.D.	January 1, 1926 – August 1, 1928	Jimmy Walker
18	Shirley W. Wynne, M.D.	August 1, 1928 – August 17, 1928 (acting); August 17, 1928 – January 1, 1934	Jimmy Walker, Joseph V. McKee, John P. O'Brien
19	John L. Rice, M.D.	January 1, 1934 – July 16, 1942	Fiorello H. La Guardia
20	Ernest Lyman Stebbins, M.D.	July 16, 1942 – March 4, 1946	Fiorello H. La Guardia, William O'Dwyer
21	Edward M. Bernecker, M.D.	March 4, 1946 – March 13, 1946	William O'Dwyer
22	Israel Weinstein, M.D.	March 13, 1946 – November 3, 1947	William O'Dwyer
23	Harry Stoll Mustard, M.D.	November 3, 1947 – January 1, 1950	William O'Dwyer
24	John Friend Mahoney, M.D.	January 1, 1950 – January 1, 1954	William O'Dwyer, Vincent R. Impellitteri
25	Leona Baumgartner, M.D.	January 1, 1954 – October 2, 1962	Robert F. Wagner, Jr.
26	George James, M.D., M.P.H.	October 2, 1962 – October 30, 1962 (acting); October 30, 1962 – October 1965	Robert F. Wagner, Jr.
—	John R. Philp, M.D.	October 1965 – January 14, 1966 (acting)	Robert F. Wagner, Jr., John V. Lindsay
—	Arthur Bushel, D.D.S., M.P.H.	January 14, 1966 – June 1, 1966 (acting)	John V. Lindsay
27	Howard Junior Brown, M.D.	June 1, 1966 – December 15, 1966	John V. Lindsay
28	Edward O'Rourke, M.D.	December 15, 1966 – May 28, 1969	John V. Lindsay
29	Mary C. McLaughlin, M.D., M.P.H.	May 28, 1969 – January 17, 1972	John V. Lindsay
30	Joseph Anthony Cimino, M.D., M.P.H.	January 17, 1972 – January 7, 1974	John V. Lindsay
31	Lowell E. Bellin, M.D., M.P.H.	January 7, 1974 – January 3, 1977	Abraham D. Beame
32	Pascal James Imperato, M.D., M.P.H., T.M.	January 3, 1977 – March 31, 1978	Abraham D. Beame
33	Reinaldo Antonio Ferrer, M.D., M.P.H.	March 31, 1978 – November 28, 1981	Edward I. Koch
34	David Judson Sencer, M.D., M.P.H.	November 28, 1981 – March 11, 1986	Edward I. Koch
35	Stephen C. Joseph, M.D., M.P.H.	March 11, 1986 – March 30, 1990	Edward I. Koch
36	Woody Myers, Jr., M.D., M.B.A.	March 30, 1990 – June 11, 1991	David N. Dinkins
37	Margaret Hamburg, M.D.	June 11, 1991 – December 24, 1991 (acting); December 24, 1991 – April 15, 1997	David Dinkins, Rudolph W. Giuliani
—	Benjamin Mojica, M.D.	April 15, 1997 – January 14, 1998 (acting)	Rudolph W. Giuliani
38	Neal L. Cohen, M.D.	January 14, 1998 – end of January, 2002	Rudolph W. Giuliani
39	Thomas R. Frieden, M.D., M.P.H.	end of January, 2002 – May 15, 2009	Michael R. Bloomberg
40	Thomas A. Farley, M.D., M.P.H.	May 18, 2009 – January 16, 2014	Michael R. Bloomberg
41	Mary Travis Bassett, M.D., M.P.H.	January 16, 2014 – August 31, 2018	Bill de Blasio
42	Oxiris Barbot, M.D.	September 1, 2018 – December 19, 2018 (acting); December 19, 2018 – August 4, 2020	Bill de Blasio
43	Dave A. Chokshi, M.D.	August 4, 2020 – March 15, 2022	Bill de Blasio, Eric Adams
44	Ashwin Vasan, M.D.	March 15, 2022 – October 18, 2024	Eric Adams
45	Michelle E. Morse, M.D., M.P.H.	October 18, 2024 – January 31, 2026	Eric Adams
46	Alister Martin, M.D., M.P.P.	January 31, 2026 – current	Zohran Mamdani
