= Dave A. Chokshi =

Former Commissioner of Health of the City of New York

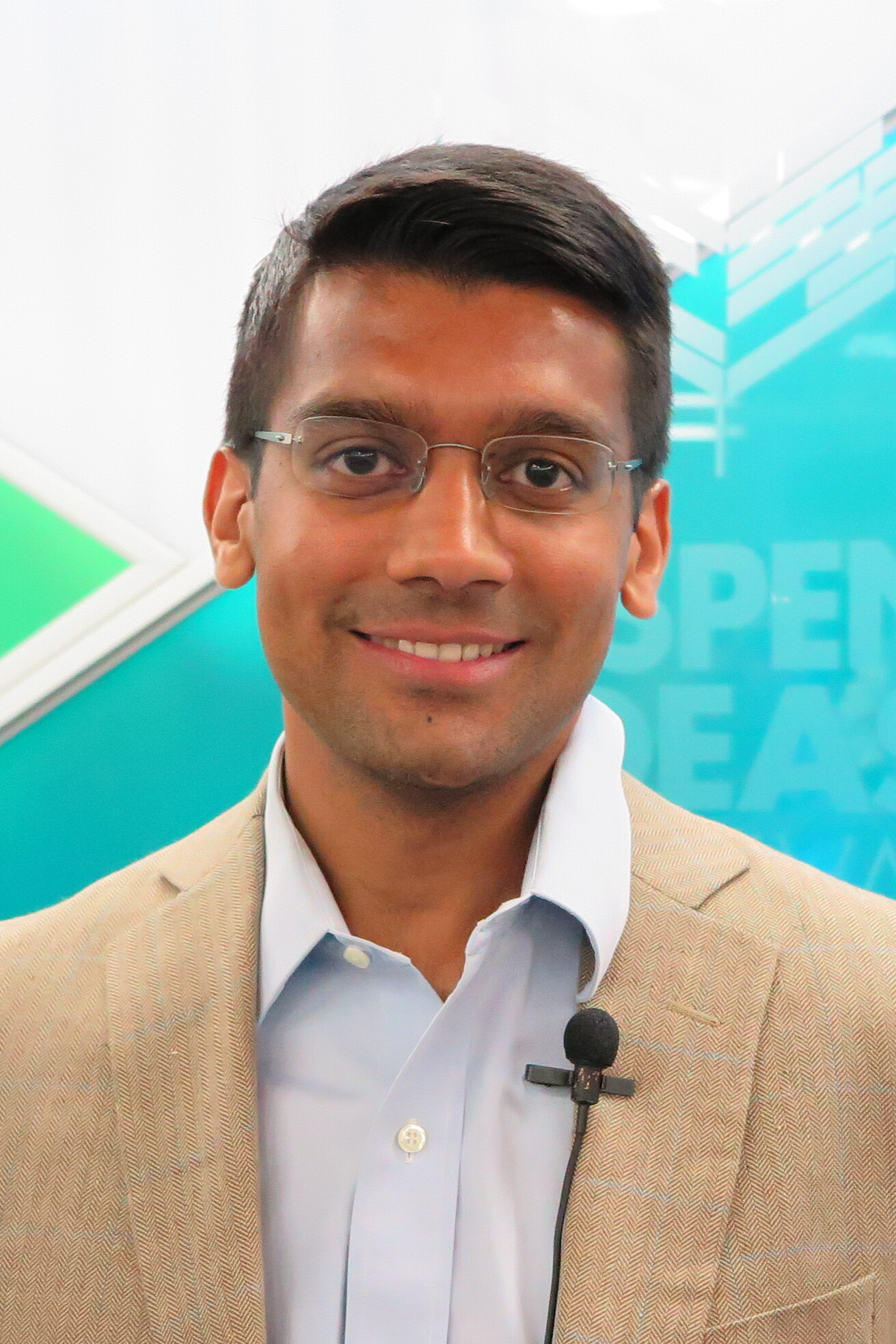
- Dr. Chokshi in 2015

43rd Commissioner of the New York City Department of Health
- In office August 4, 2020 – March 15, 2022
- Mayor: Bill de Blasio; Eric Adams
- Preceded by: Oxiris Barbot
- Succeeded by: Ashwin Vasan

Personal details
- Born: Dave Ashok Chokshi; May 8, 1981 (age 45) Baton Rouge, Louisiana, U.S.
- Children: 2
- Education: Duke University (BA); University of Oxford (MSc); University of Pennsylvania (MD)
- Awards: Rhodes Scholarship; Truman Scholarship; Paul and Daisy Soros Fellowship

Dave Ashok Chokshi (born May 8, 1981) is an American physician and former public health official who served as the 43rd health commissioner of New York City. He was the first health commissioner of Asian descent. Chokshi previously served as the inaugural chief population health officer for NYC Health + Hospitals and as a White House fellow in the United States Department of Veterans Affairs. Currently he is a practicing physician at Bellevue Hospital and the inaugural Sternberg Family Professor of Leadership at the Colin Powell School for Civic and Global Leadership, part of the City College of New York. He is also chair of the not-for-profit organization The Common Health Coalition.

== Early life and education ==
Chokshi was born and raised in Baton Rouge, Louisiana. where he graduated as valedictorian from Baton Rouge Magnet High School. Then, he earned a Bachelor of Arts degree from Duke University, where he double-majored in chemistry and public policy studies. As a Rhodes Scholar, Chokshi earned two Master of Science degrees, in global public health and in comparative social policy, from the University of Oxford. He earned a medical degree from the Perelman School of Medicine at the University of Pennsylvania, where he was elected by his peers to win the Joel Gordon Miller Prize, and completed internal medicine residency at Brigham & Women's Hospital and Harvard Medical School.

== Career ==
Chokshi previously served in the Louisiana Department of Health during Hurricane Katrina. He was a White House Fellow during the Obama administration and served as principal health advisor to the United States Secretary of Veterans Affairs. Chokshi served on the FEMA delegation to New York City after Hurricane Sandy in 2012. Chokshi has been a primary care internist at Bellevue Hospital since 2014 and a clinical professor of population health and medicine at the New York University School of Medicine. In addition to serving as the chief population health officer for NYC Health + Hospitals, Chokshi was also the chief executive officer of the NYC Health + Hospitals Accountable Care Organization, one of the few ACOs in the nation to achieve high quality and cost performance for ten consecutive years.

Chokshi has written widely on public health and medicine including in The New England Journal of Medicine, JAMA, The Lancet, Health Affairs, Science and Scientific American. In 2016, President Obama appointed him to the Advisory Group on Prevention, Health Promotion and Integrative and Public Health.

In August 2020, Chokshi was selected to serve as health commissioner of New York City after the previous commissioner, Oxiris Barbot, resigned amid disagreements with then-mayor Bill de Blasio over the handling of the COVID-19 pandemic. During his tenure, he led the City's response to the COVID-19 pandemic, including its historic campaign to vaccinate over 6 million New Yorkers, saving tens of thousands of lives. Chokshi architected treatment strategies, navigated school and economic reopenings, and served as principal public spokesperson. Under his tenure, the Health Department's budget grew to its highest-ever level, reflecting investment in signature initiatives such as the Public Health Corps, Pandemic Response Institute, and New Family Home Visiting program. In 2021, the department also stewarded the launch of the nation's first publicly-authorized overdose prevention centers—as well as a landmark Board of Health resolution on racism as a public health crisis.

In December 2021, Chokshi announced he will serve as health commissioner until March 2022 for purposes of transition for incoming Mayor Eric Adams. Adams announced March 11, 2022 as Dr. Dave Chokshi Day "for his leadership during the pandemic and his dedication to protecting and improving the health of all New Yorkers." Chokshi stepped down from his role as health commissioner on March 15, 2022.

Since stepping down, Chokshi has spoken and written about several health topics, including: the lessons of the COVID-19 pandemic, how to reverse the decline in American life expectancy, combating medical misinformation, universal health care, reforming public health, and focusing on 'health span' beyond lifespan. In August 2023, Chokshi was appointed the inaugural Sternberg Family Professor of Leadership at the Colin Powell School of Civic and Global Leadership, part of the City College of New York, within the City University of New York (CUNY) system. He also teaches at the CUNY School of Public Health, where he is a senior scholar.

== Personal life ==
Chokshi lives in Jackson Heights, Queens with his wife and two daughters. Chokshi's wife is a public school teacher and administrator. He is the son of Indian immigrants.

In February 2021, Chokshi tested positive for COVID-19 and shared his personal story to encourage New Yorkers to get vaccinated.

== See also ==
- Indian Americans in New York City

Government offices
Preceded by Oxiris Barbot	Commissioner of Health of the City of New York; 2020–March 15, 2022	Succeeded by Ashwin Vasan
