= New York City Department of Health and Mental Hygiene =

New York City government agency

Department of Health and Mental Hygiene

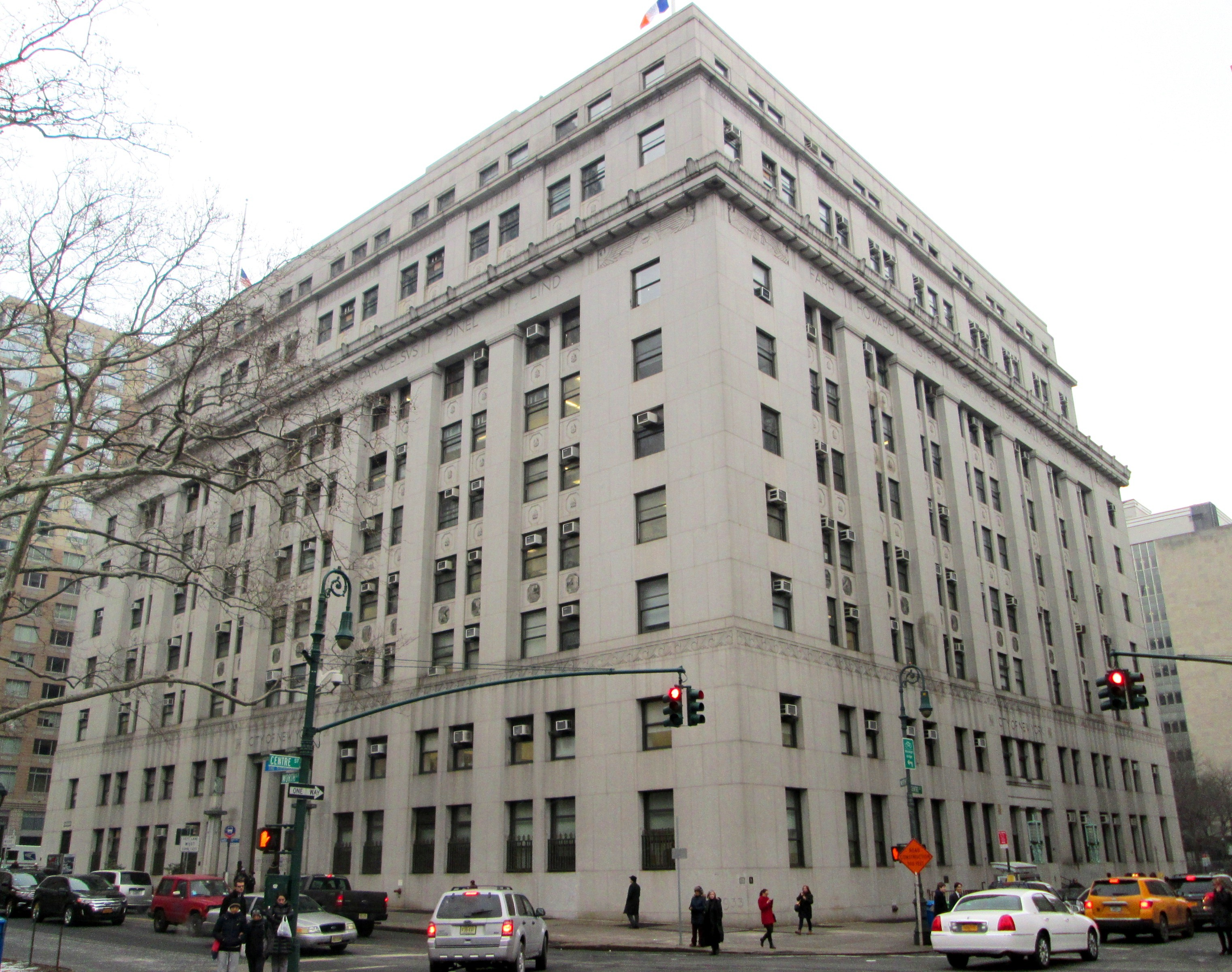
- 125 Worth Street in 2013

Department overview
- Formed: April 5, 1870; 156 years ago
- Preceding agencies: Health Committee, 1793; New York City Board of Health, 1805; Metropolitan Board of Health, 1866
- Jurisdiction: New York City
- Headquarters: 42-09 28th St Long Island City, NY 11101
- Employees: 4,208 (FY 2026)
- Annual budget: $2.67 billion (FY 2026)
- Department executive: Dr. Alister Martin, Commissioner of Health and Mental Hygiene
- Child department: New York City Board of Health
- Key document: New York City Charter
- Website: nyc.gov/health

The New York City Department of Health and Mental Hygiene (also known as NYC Health) is the department of the government of New York City responsible for public health along with issuing birth certificates, dog licenses, and conducting restaurant inspection and enforcement. The New York City Board of Health is part of the department. Its regulations are compiled in title 24 of the New York City Rules (the New York City Health Code). The current commissioner is Dr. Alister Martin. The New York State Department of Health, through the Public Health Law and State Sanitary Code, supervises and enforces statewide standards.

== History ==
The department was initially set up as the Health Committee (later Commission), a quasi-governmental public health group in response to a yellow fever outbreak in Philadelphia in 1793. Governor John Jay made a proclamation on 13 September 1793 to establish this to regulate the ports of the city and ensure proper quarantines. Three days later, the city, under the leadership of Mayor Richard Varick, created a tandem committee that ensured both private and commercial needs would be addressed. New York would see additional epidemics in 1795, 1796, 1798, 1799, and 1800, which lead to the creation of the 'New York City Board of Health', which held its first meeting in 1805.

=== Report of the Council of Hygiene and Public Health ===
Report of the Council of Hygiene and Public Health (Note: Full title: Report of the Council of Hygiene and Public Health of the Citizens' Association of New York upon the sanitary condition of the city) is a 1865 report on the sanitary condition of New York City.

The work on the report commenced in May 1864, when the Council of Hygiene and Public Health of the Citizens launched a comprehensive street-by-street sanitary survey of the city. It was administered by a team of physicians tasked with documenting the living conditions of virtually every household in Manhattan.

Apart from the public healthcare concerns, the report was preoccupied with the “political and social aspects” of sanitation and made a direct link between its poor condition and draft riots of 1863:

The mobs that held sway in our city during the memorable outbreak of violence in the month of July, 1863, were gathered in the overcrowded neglected quarters of the city.

A first edition of the influential Viele map of Manhattan's relief, water bodies, and pristine shoreline was included in the report under the title Sanitary & Topographical Map of the City and Island of New York

=== Metropolitan Board of Health to Department of Health ===
In 1866, the New York State legislature enacted a bill establishing the 'Metropolitan Board of Health', consisting of the four Police Commissioners, four Health Commissioners appointed by the Governor, and the Health Officer for the Port of New York. In 1870, the legislature replaced the Board of Health with the Department of Health, with additional responsibilities including street cleaning and sanitary permits.

As of December 1894, Charles G. Wilson was serving as President of the Board of Health.

=== Department of Mental Health, Mental Retardation and Alcoholism Services (1976-2002) ===
In 1976, a new department, titled the "Department of Mental Health, Mental Retardation and Alcoholism Services" was established as distinct from the existing Department of Health.

=== Department of Health and Mental Hygiene ===
As a result of its consolidation with the Department of Mental Health, Mental Retardation and Alcoholism Services, it was renamed the Department of Health and Mental Hygiene on July 29, 2002. This merge was first proposed by Mayor Rudy Giuliani in 1998.

In 2021, Michelle E. Morse was named the first Chief Medical Officer of the New York City Department of Health and Mental Hygiene. She was also the Acting Commissioner for the agency from 2024-2026.

== Organization ==
NYC is organized into 30 health districts, themselves composed of 354 health areas which are sets of census tracts. NYC is also organized into 17 mental health regions.

The departmental hierarchy is:

- New York City Board of Health
- Commissioner of Health
  - General Counsel
  - Chief Medical Examiner
  - Executive Deputy Commissioner and Chief Operating Officer
    - Deputy Commissioner for Mental Hygiene
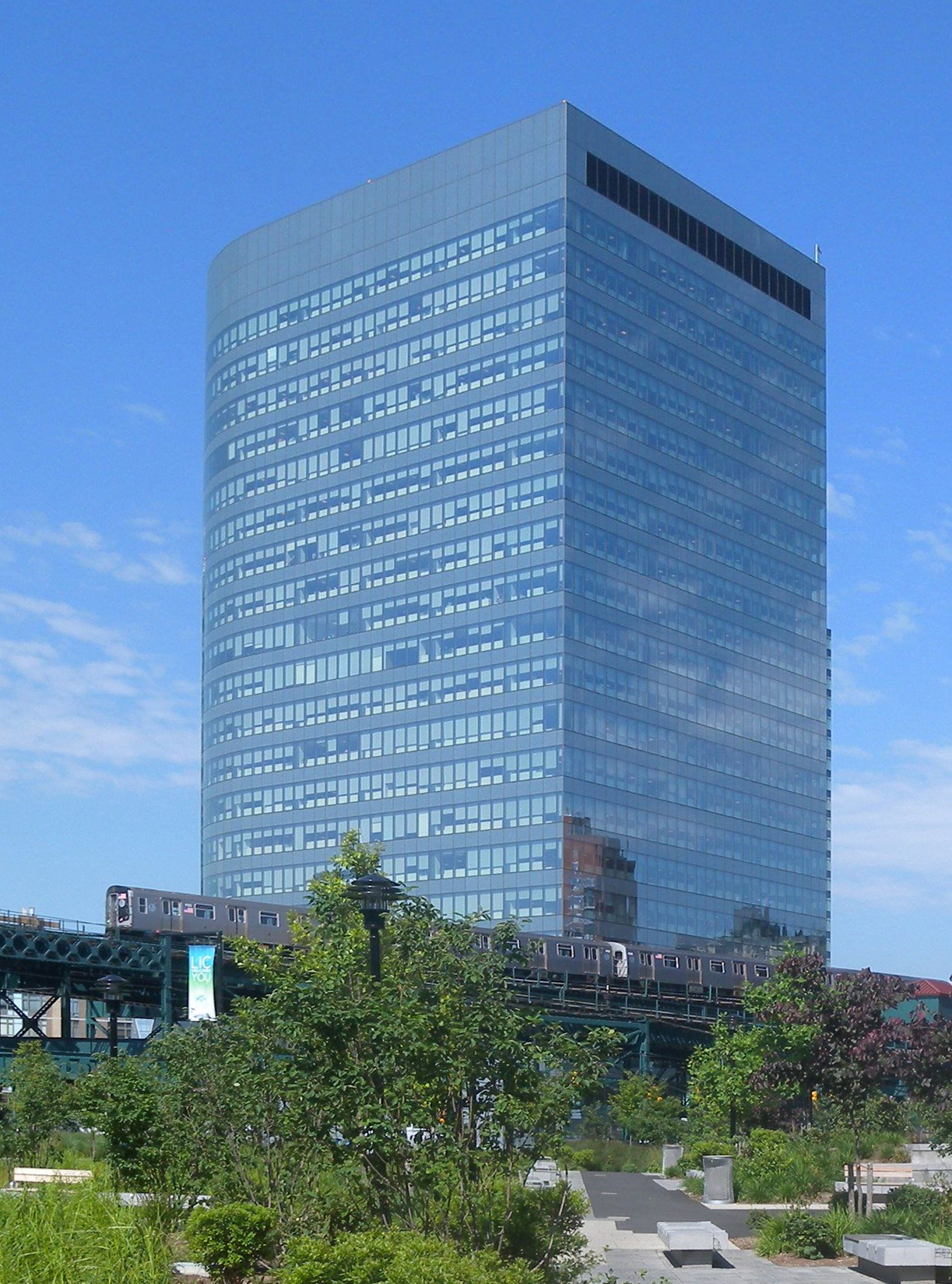
      2 Gotham Center in Long Island City, home to New York City's Department of Health and Mental Hygiene
      - Alcohol and Drug Treatment
      - Child and Adolescent Services
      - Mental Health
      - Developmental Disabilities
      - Systems Strengthening and Access
    - Deputy Commissioner for Disease Control
      - Communicable Diseases
      - HIV/AIDS Prevention and Control
      - Immunization
      - Public Health Laboratory
      - STI Prevention and Control
      - Tuberculosis Control
    - Deputy Commissioner for Environmental Health
      - Environmental Disease Prevention
      - Environmental Emergency Preparedness and Response
      - Environmental Sciences and Engineering
      - Environmental Surveillance and Policy
      - Food Safety and Community Sanitation
      - Poison Control Center
      - Veterinary and Pest Control
    - Deputy Commissioner for Epidemiology
      - Epidemiology Services
      - Vital Statistics
      - Public Health Training
      - World Trade Center Health Registry
    - Deputy Commissioner for Health Care Access and Improvement
      - Correctional Health Services
      - Primary Care Access and Planning
      - Primary Care Information Project
      - Information Technology Initiatives
    - Deputy Commissioner for Health Promotion and Disease Prevention
      - Chronic Disease Prevention and Tobacco Control
      - District Public Health Offices
      - Maternal, Infant and Reproductive Health
      - School Health
    - Deputy Commissioner for Administration
    - Deputy Commissioner for Finance
    - Deputy Commissioner and Chief Information Officer
    - Deputy Commissioner for Emergency Preparedness and Response

=== Public safety ===
This agency employs Special Officers who provide on-site safety and security at 20 NYC Health and Mental Hygiene facilities. NYC DOHMH special officers have very limited peace officer authority in connection with special assignment of employment pursuant to New York State Criminal Procedure Law § 2.10(40) and DOHMH policies, the exercise of these powers are very limited to the employee's geographical area of employment and while such employee is working only. NYC DOHMH Special Officers are prohibited by state law from carrying a firearm.

The New York City Police Department is the primary policing and investigation agency within New York City as per the New York City Charter, which includes all NYC DOHMH facilities.

=== Board of Health ===
The New York City Board of Health is part of the Department of Health and Mental Hygiene and consists of the commissioner of the department, the chairperson of the department's Mental Hygiene Advisory Board, and nine other members appointed by the mayor.

Members	Titles	Appointed	Notes
Dave A. Chokshi	MD	August 4, 2020	Commissioner of Health of the City of New York.
Pamela S. Brier	MPH		Maimonides Medical Center former CEO.
Sixto R. Caro	MD		NYU School of Medicine clinical assistant professor; NYU Langone physician.
Joel A. Forman	MD		Icahn School of Medicine at Mount Sinai professor; Mount Sinai Hospital affiliated.
Susan Klitzman	DrPH, MPH, CPH		CUNY School of Public Health professor.
Lynne D. Richardson	MD, FACEP		Icahn School of Medicine at Mount Sinai professor; Mount Sinai Hospital affiliated.
Gail B. Nayowith	MSW		1digit LLC principal.
Rosa M. Gil	DSW		Comunilife Inc. CEO.
Karen B. Redlener	MS		Children's Health Fund executive director.
Mitchell H. Katz	MD		NYC Health + Hospitals president.

== See also ==
- List of Commissioners of Health of the City of New York
- New York City Office of Administrative Trials and Hearings (OATH), for hearings conducted on certain summonses issued by the Department
- New York City Health and Hospitals Corporation
- New York State Department of Health
- New York State Department of Mental Hygiene (disambiguation)
- Metropolitan Board of Health
- Sugary Drinks Portion Cap Rule
