= COVID-19 pandemic in New York City =

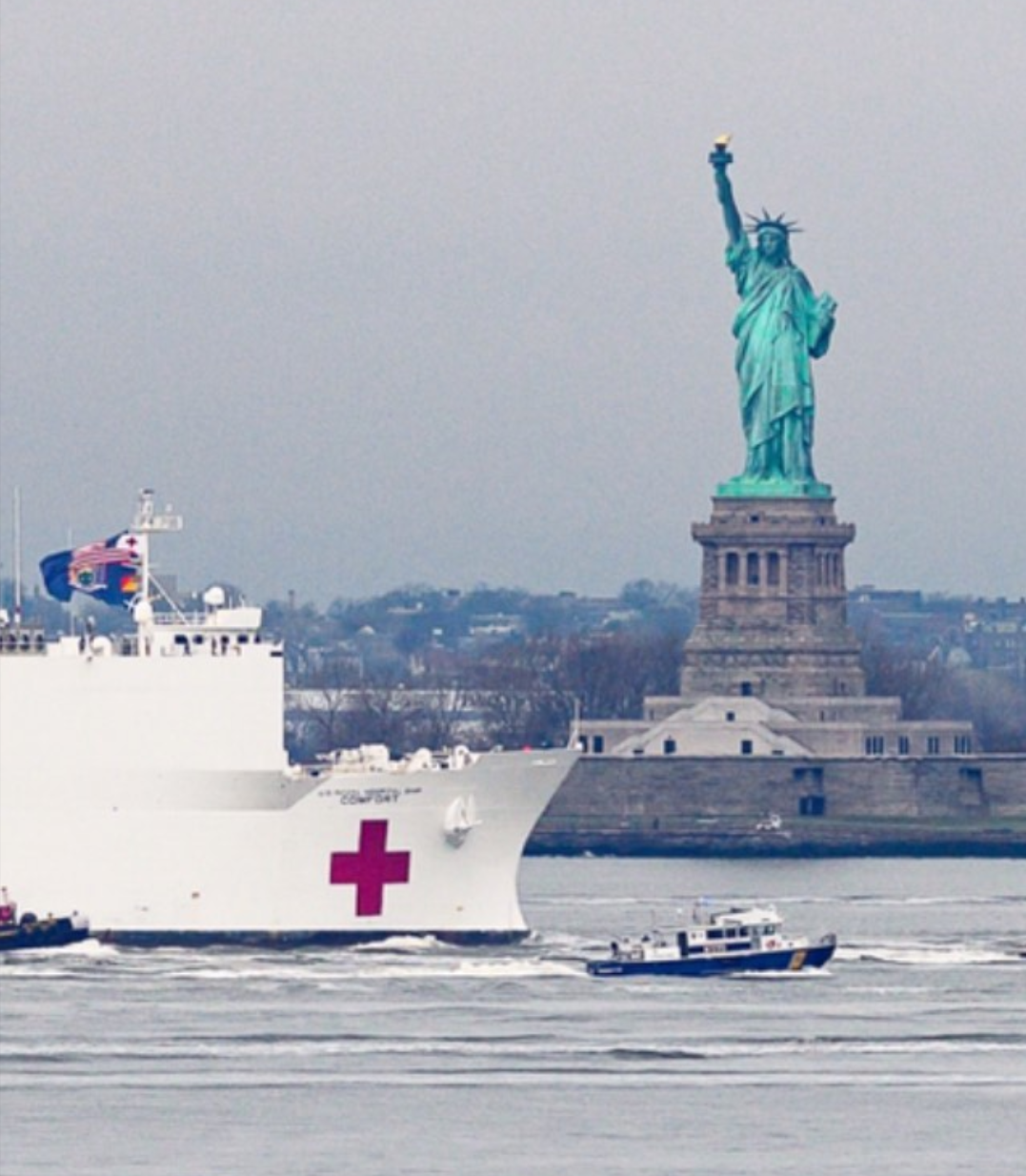
- The USNS Comfort passing by the Statue of Liberty in New York Harbor on March 30, 2020

- Confirmed cases per 100,000 residents in the greater New York City area, as of July 3, 2020
- Disease: COVID-19
- Pathogen: SARS-CoV-2
- Location: New York City, New York, United States; New York Metropolitan Area (depending on criteria of study)
- First outbreak: Wuhan, Hubei, China
- Index case: Manhattan
- Arrival date: mid-February 2020 (first case confirmed March 1, 2020)
- Confirmed cases: 535,700 (CSA; June 4, 2020); 2,726,785 (NYC; April 13, 2023)
- Hospitalized cases: 213,475
- Deaths: 45,194 (38,795 confirmed, 6,399 probable)

Government website
- www.nyc.gov/coronavirus

The first case of the COVID-19 pandemic in New York City was confirmed on March 1, 2020, though later research showed that the novel coronavirus had been circulating in New York City (NYC) since January, with cases of community transmission confirmed as early as February. By March 29, 2020, over 30,000 cases were confirmed, and New York City had become the worst-affected area in the United States. There were over 2,000 deaths by April 6, 2020; at that stage, the city had more confirmed coronavirus cases than China, the UK, or Iran. Bodies of the deceased were picked up from their homes by the US Army, National Guard, and Air National Guard.

Starting March 16, 2020, New York City schools were closed. On March 20, 2020, the New York State governor's office issued an executive order closing "non-essential" businesses. The city's public transportation system remained open, but service was substantially reduced. By April 2020, hundreds of thousands of New Yorkers were out of work, with lost tax revenues estimated to run into the billions of dollars. Low-income jobs in the retail, transportation, and restaurant sectors were especially affected. Over the course of the year, average residential and commercial rents both declined more than 10% in Manhattan, and vacancies surged.

The first phase of reopening began in June 2020 with reduced occupancy ceilings. Schools reopened in September. The police department was ordered to enforce public health measures and conduct emergency inspections at private schools. Spikes in infection rates were observed in some neighborhoods, prompting tighter restrictions in ZIP codes that were identified as "cluster" areas. Public schools were closed again to in-person learning in November, as the seven-day rolling average positivity rate continued to rise over 3%. Indoor dining was suspended again on December 14, 2020. COVID-19 vaccinations began at nursing homes on December 21. Public health researchers estimated that 44% of all metro New York residents had been infected by December 31, 2020.

Face masks in public areas were mandated throughout New York State by an executive order on April 15, 2020. The COVID-19 pandemic is one of the deadliest disasters by death toll in the history of New York City. As of August 19, 2023, the city's confirmed COVID-19 deaths exceeded 45,000 and probable deaths exceeded 5,500.

As of September 15, 2023, when the NYC Health Department stopped reporting new COVID-19 vaccination data, New York City had administered 19,849,266 COVID-19 vaccine doses.

== Timeline ==
=== 2020 ===
The first case of COVID-19 was confirmed in New York State on March 1, 2020, in a 39-year-old health care worker who had returned home to Manhattan from Iran on February 25. Genomic analyses suggest the disease had been introduced to New York as early as January, and that most cases were linked to Europe, rather than Asia. A Queens man contracted COVID-19 via community transmission in late February, falling ill on February 29.

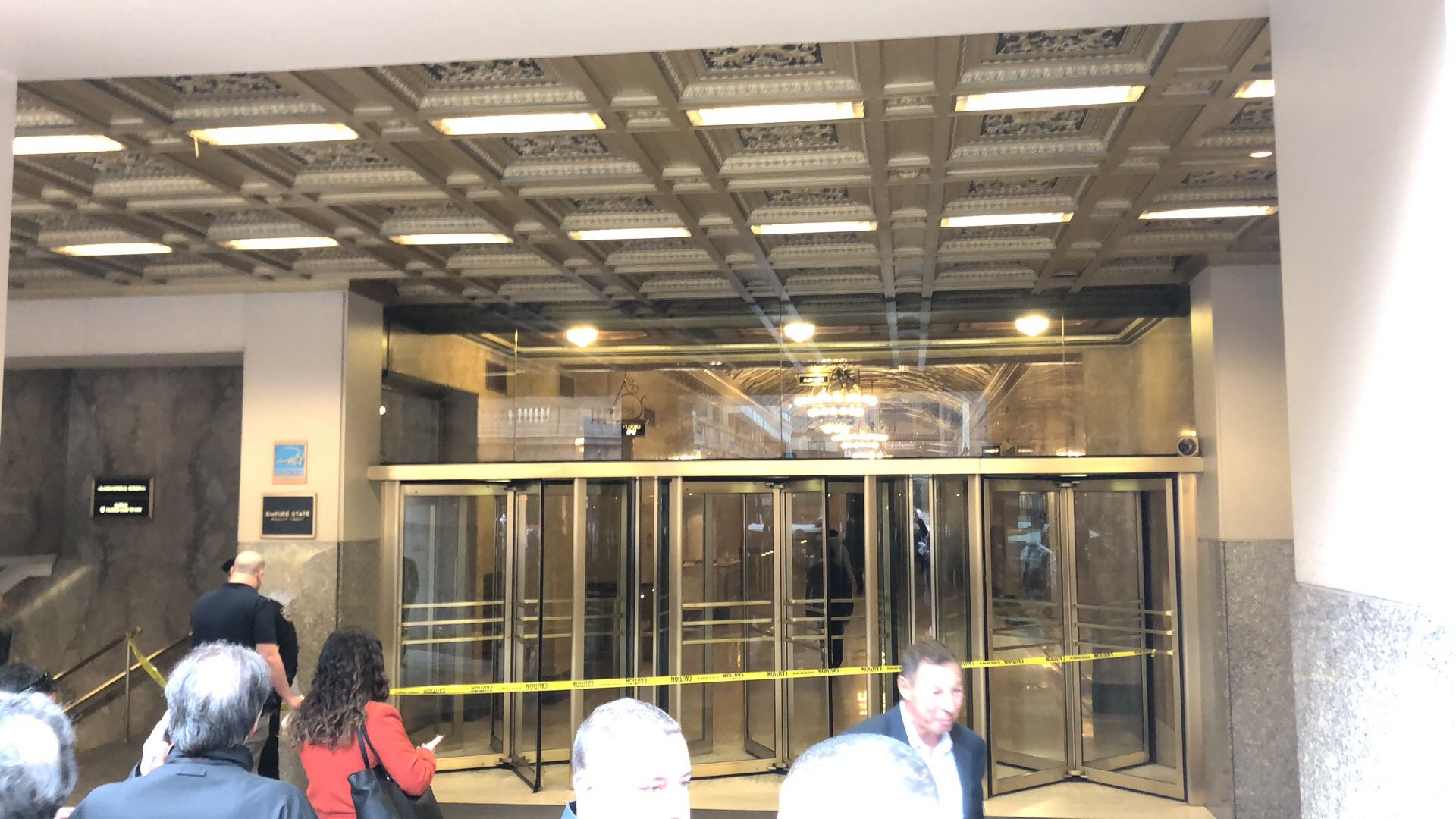
NYPD taping off One Grand Central Place during the early afternoon of March 3, 2020, in response to New York's first confirmed case of COVID-19 person-to-person spread

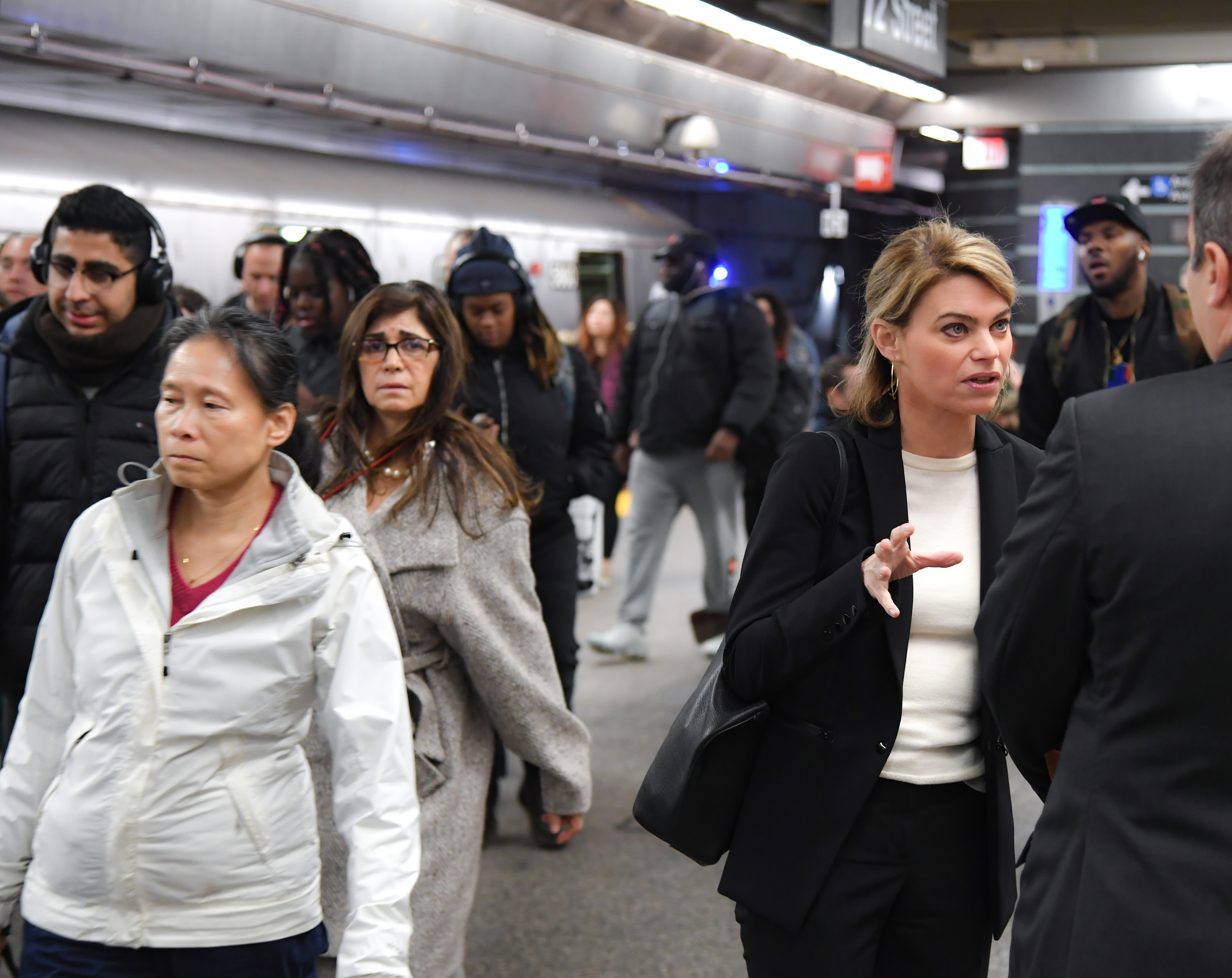
New York City Subway passengers on March 9, when there were 16 confirmed cases of COVID-19 in New York City, with NYC Transit Interim President Sarah Feinberg on the right

On March 3, New York Governor Andrew Cuomo announced that the first recorded case of person-to-person spread in New York State had been confirmed via a New Rochelle man who was working at a law firm within One Grand Central Place in Midtown Manhattan. Six days later, on March 9, Mayor Bill de Blasio announced that there were 16 confirmed cases of COVID-19 in New York City. Cuomo announced a New Rochelle "containment area" on March 10, and the World Health Organization declared a global COVID-19 pandemic on March 11.

The virus entered its exponential growth stage. At the time, the city's infection rate was five times higher than the rest of the country, and its cases were one-third of total confirmed US cases. The reasons for the high infection rate continue to be discussed. On March 27, Queens was the worst-affected borough by number of deaths, with over a third of total deaths.

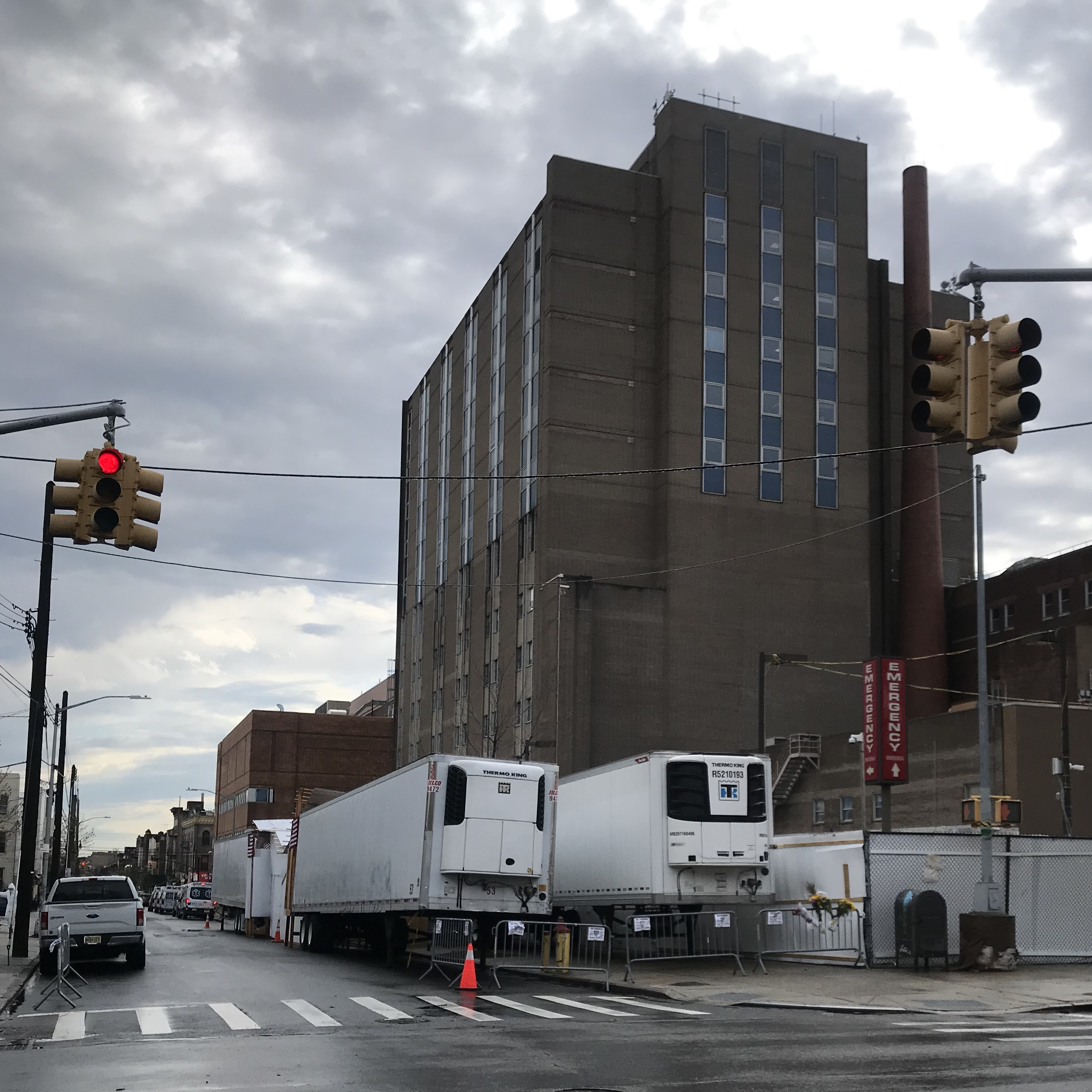
Refrigerated trucks filled with COVID-19 victims outside Wyckoff Heights Medical Center

The USNS Comfort hospital ship arrived in New York Harbor on March 30. Field hospitals were also set up in several places citywide. Refrigerator trucks were set up on city streets outside hospitals to accommodate the overflow of bodies of the deceased.

On April 4, President Donald Trump announced that 1,000 additional federal medical soldiers would be deployed to New York City. It was reported that "Urban Area Medical Task Forces" made up of army reservists would be working in the New York City field hospitals and other parts of the country. As of April 4, there were 1,200 medical military personnel serving on the USNS Comfort. 2,700 New York State National Guard forces had also been deployed.

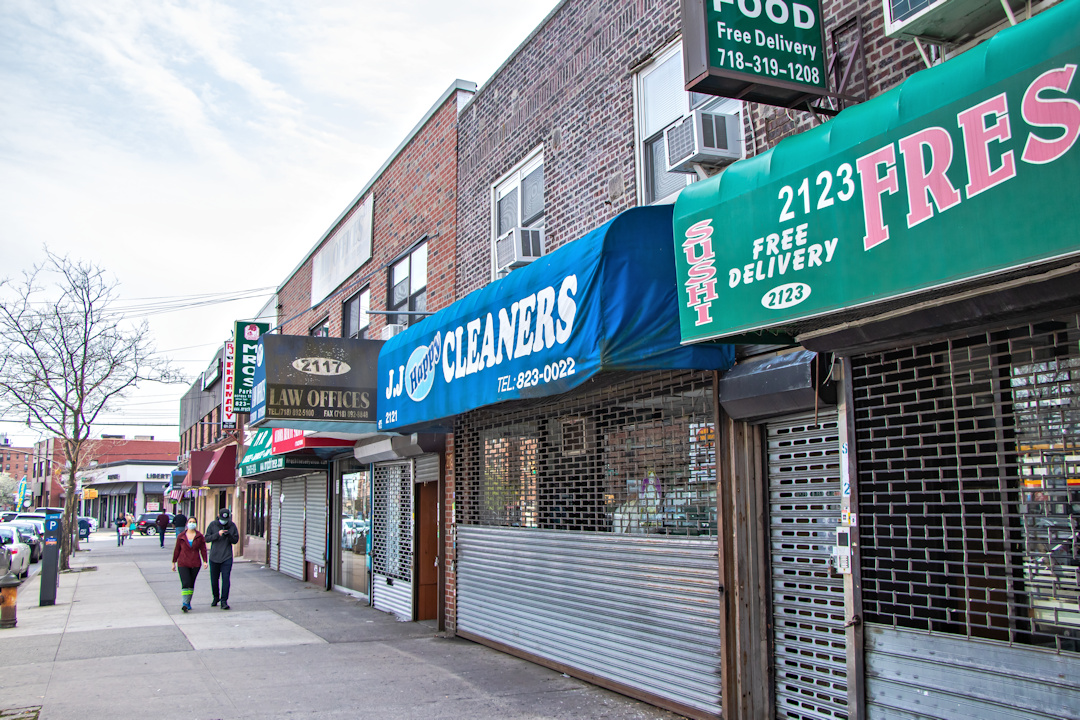
Closed non-essential retailers in Morris Park, the Bronx, during the COVID-19 pandemic

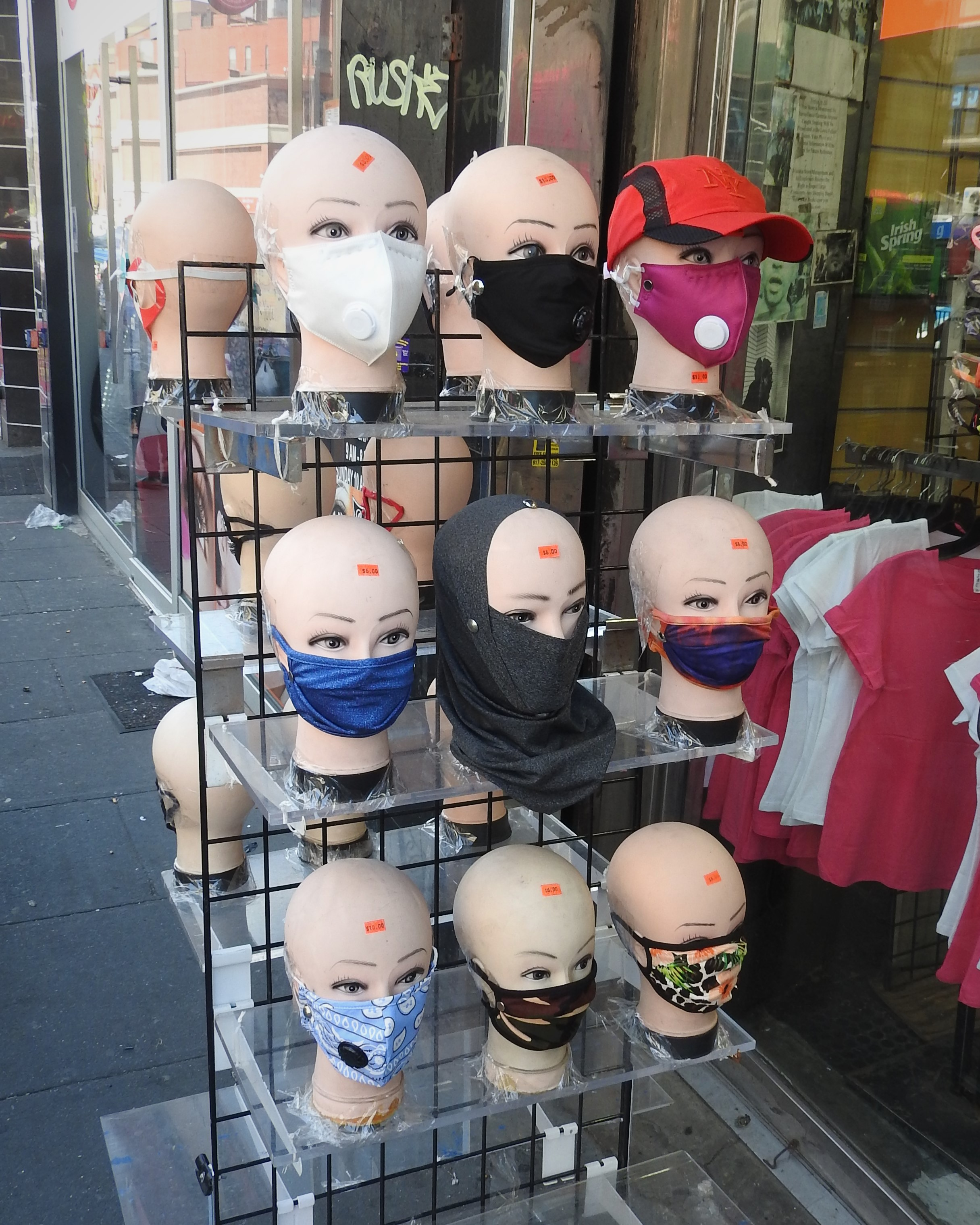
Masks for sale in June, South Bronx

On April 5, it was reported that a Malayan tiger at the already-closed Bronx Zoo tested positive for COVID-19. This was the first known case of an animal in the US (or a tiger anywhere) being infected with the disease. The tiger had started showing symptoms on March 27, including a dry cough, wheezing, and weakened appetite. The source of the infection was believed to be an infected zookeeper who was not yet showing symptoms. On April 22, it was reported that four additional tigers and three lions had tested positive.

By April 6, New York City had nearly 25% of the total deaths from COVID-19 in the U.S. During May, active COVID-19 cases started to decline. After the George Floyd protests in New York City started in late May, public officials expressed concern about the spread of COVID-19 via the crowded events.

On June 8, the city commenced the first phase of its reopening plan after meeting seven conditions of the stay-at-home order, which had been put in place three months earlier. On June 24, New York state, along with New Jersey and Connecticut, began requiring travelers to self-quarantine for 14 days if traveling from an area with high infection rates.

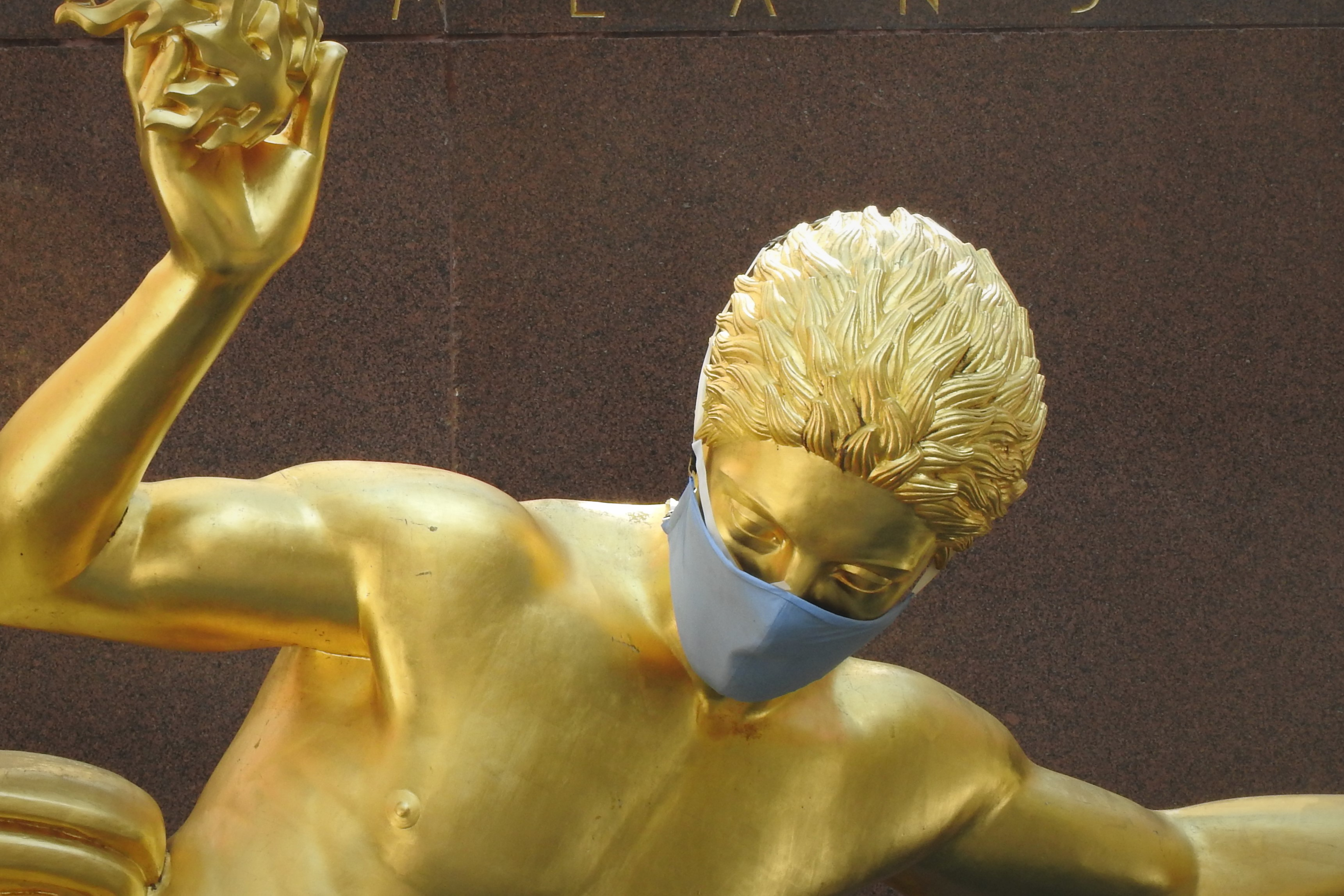
Prometheus, masked for protection

Plans to open indoor dining during the Phase 3 reopening were postponed due to the heightened risks posed by customers refusing to wear face masks and the uncertain role of air conditioning in COVID spread. Indoor dining in other states has resulted in superspreading at certain venues. To compensate in part, outdoor space was expanded by shutting down certain areas to create more space for outdoor dining. Plans to reopen museums in Phase 4 were also postponed.

On the nineteenth anniversary ceremony of the September 11 attacks at the National September 11 Memorial & Museum, the reading of names of victims, usually by family members, was instead recorded in advance. Mask protocols and social distance measures were also in place. The Tunnels to Towers foundation held a simultaneous memorial nearby at Zuccotti Park where around 125 family members took part in reading names.

In early October, the city was still in Phase 4 of reopening, which included museums, gardens, botanical gardens and gyms. Twenty ZIP Codes were identified as cluster areas. In response, the governor's office announced what they called "direct enforcement" of COVID-19 related restrictions in high-risk neighborhoods in Brooklyn and Queens. The mayor's office proposed closing businesses deemed "non-essential" and on-site dining. In-person schooling would have to shut down in nine ZIP Codes with 14-day positivity rates over 3%, while another eleven ZIP Codes were placed on a "watch list" because their positivity rates were 1–3%.

On October 6, Governor Andrew Cuomo introduced a "micro-cluster strategy". The new plan placed tighter restrictions in cluster areas with spikes in COVID-19 cases. The first areas to experience these new restrictions were parts of Brooklyn and Queens.

Public schools were closed indefinitely on November 19 after the rolling seven-day average reached 3%. Despite calls from health experts to close indoor dining before it was too late "to reverse the tide of new infections", the governor's office declined to impose restrictions until the statistical thresholds were met. The mayor's office took charge of closing schools only. Some epidemiologists and public health officials have criticized the decision to close schools, while allowing indoor dining to continue. The school-closure policy was partly reversed less than two weeks later, with de Blasio announcing that elementary schools would resume in-person learning from December 7. However, intermediate and high schools would remain closed through 2021.

COVID-19 vaccinations were authorized by the U.S. Food and Drug Administration on December 11. New York administered the vaccine first to health-care workers, and then to nursing-home residents starting December 21.

Public health researchers estimated that 44 percent of metro New York residents had been infected by December 31, 2020, based on a combination of virus testing, antibody testing, fatality counts, and population mobility data.

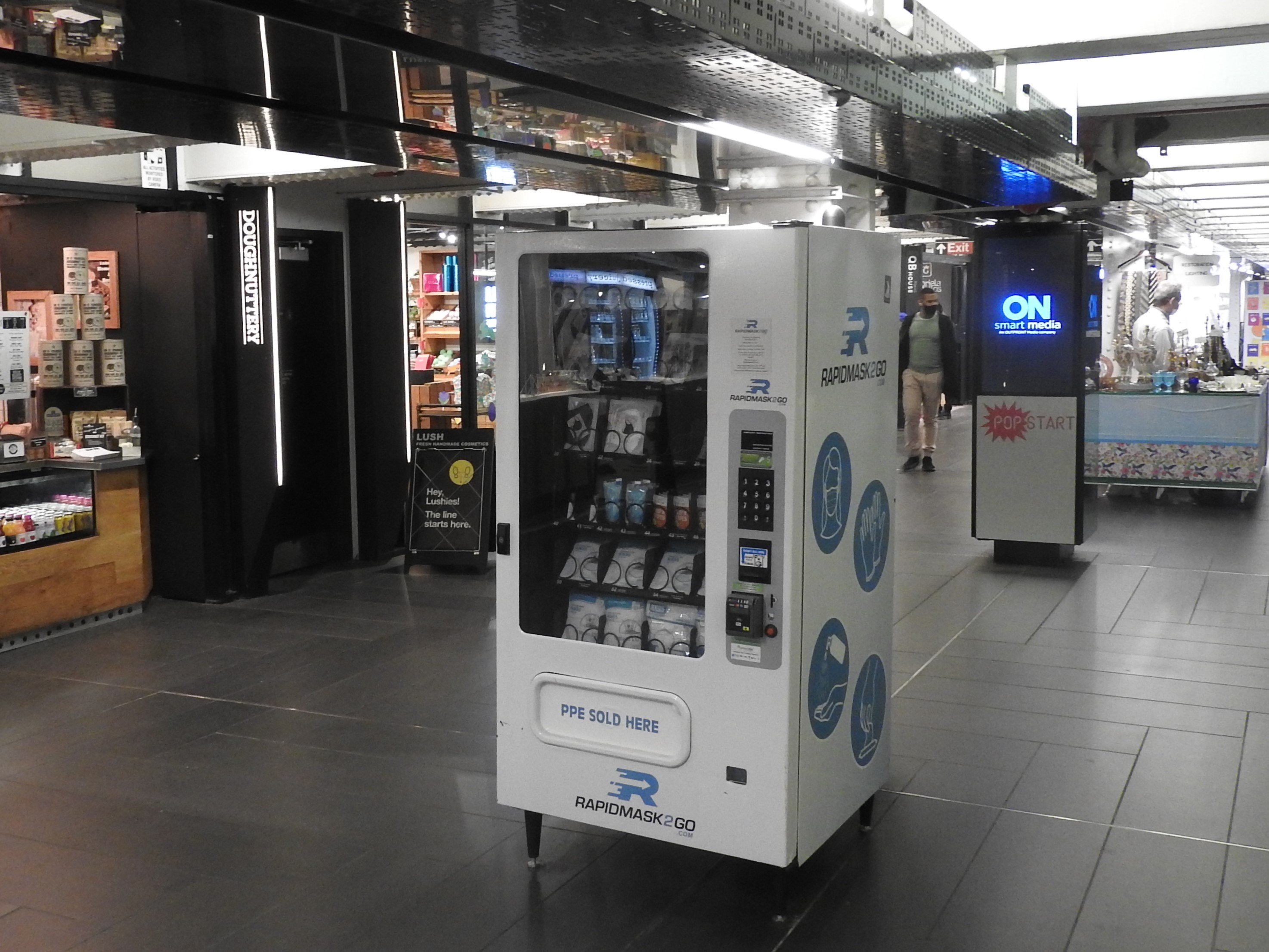
Mask vending machine in a subway station, April 2021

=== 2021 ===
On February 8, 2021, it was announced that public middle schools would reopen for in-person learning on February 25. On March 8, it was announced that public high schools would reopen for in-person learning on March 22. On April 29, de Blasio announced that New York City would fully reopen on July 1. By June, the city's overall testing positivity rate had reached its lowest since the pandemic began. Cuomo reopened the entirety of New York state on June 15, two weeks ahead of Mayor Bill de Blasio's planned July 1 reopening.

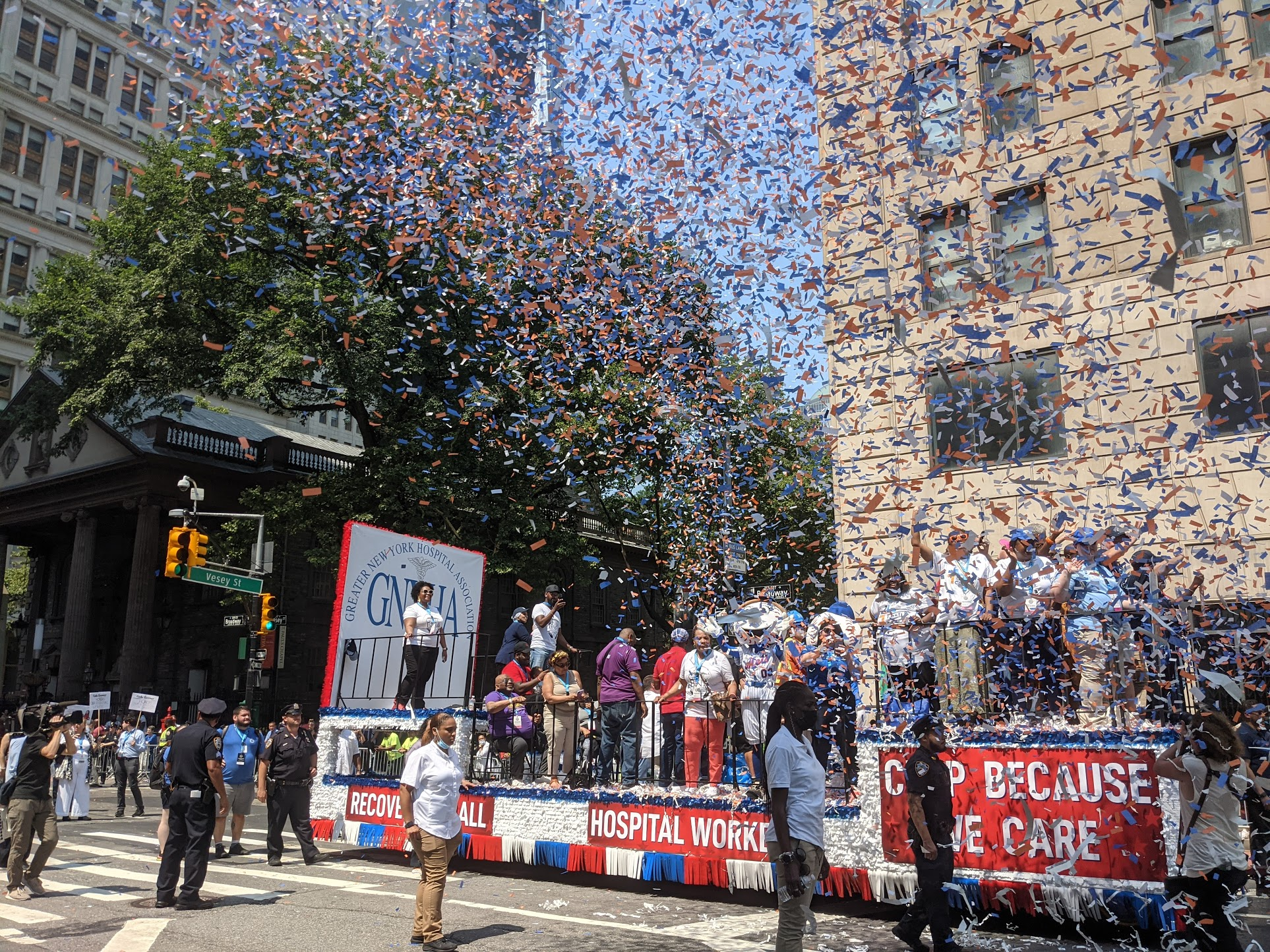
Healthcare workers being honored for their efforts in combatting COVID-19 during a July 7, 2021 ticker-tape parade for essential workers in New York, NY.

On July 7, 2021, the city held a "Hometown Heroes" ticker tape parade to honor healthcare professionals and essential workers for their work during the pandemic. The Uniformed Firefighters Association asked its members to boycott the event, however, saying that COVID-related risks to firefighters had not yet ended, citing the case of a union member who was in the intensive care unit (ICU) with COVID-related pneumonia at the time of the parade. The Uniformed EMS Officers Union also asked its members not to attend the parade due to an ongoing dispute with the city over a lack of hazard pay during the pandemic.

On July 23, 2021, the city's health department announced that daily average cases were 32% higher than the prior week and that the Delta variant had become the dominant COVID strain, accounting for 57% of citywide samples over a four-week period. On August 2, 2021, de Blasio recommended that vaccinated people wear masks in indoor settings, following CDC guidance and a continued uptick in positive COVID cases due to the Delta variant. The next day, it was announced that masks would be required indoors beginning August 16.

On August 3, de Blasio announced that New York City would become the first in the United States to require proof of vaccination for workers and customers at all indoor dining establishments, gyms, entertainment venues, and performances. As of August 16, patrons would be expected to show either their vaccination cards or one of two authorized vaccine passport apps: the city's NYC COVID Safe app or the state's Excelsior app. Enforcement of the requirement began in September.

=== Current ===
As of January 2026, the New York City Department of Health and Mental Hygiene (DOHMH) continues to monitor SARS-CoV-2 through an integrated respiratory virus surveillance system. For the week ending January 17, 2026, laboratory-confirmed COVID-19 cases in the city were reported at low levels (approximately 1,000 cases), representing a decrease from the previous week's 1,300 cases, even as influenza activity remained high.

== Government response ==
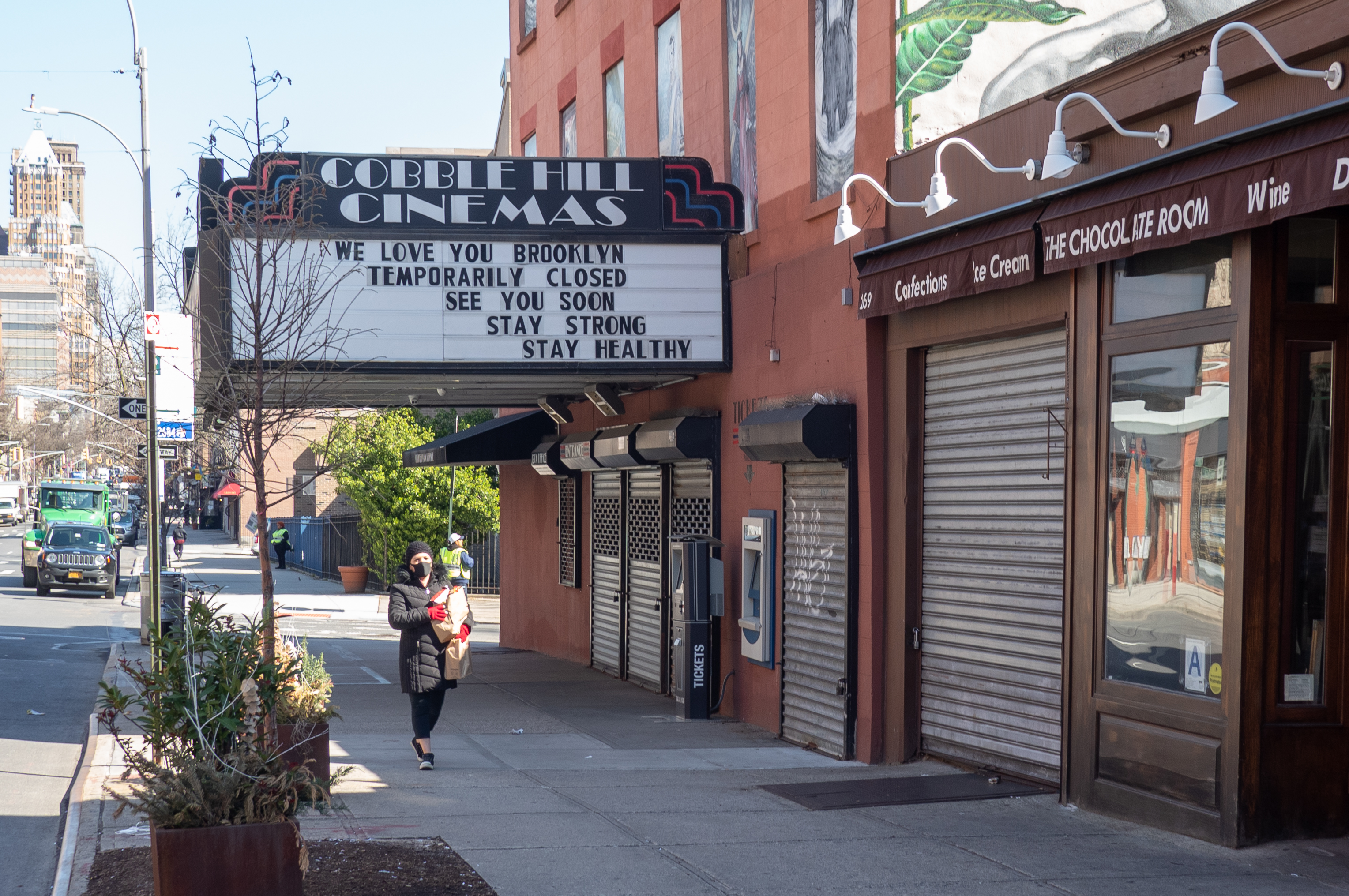
A woman wearing a mask walks by the Cobble Hill Cinemas in Brooklyn, which closed as a non-essential business

On March 2, 2020, de Blasio tweeted that people should ignore the virus and "go on with your lives + get out on the town despite Coronavirus." At a press conference the next day, New York City Commissioner of Health Oxiris Barbot said, "We are encouraging New Yorkers to go about their everyday lives." On March 4, she said, "There's no indication that being in a car, being in the subways with someone who's potentially sick is a risk factor." New York City Council members Robert Holden and Eric Ulrich wrote to Mayor de Blasio asking him to relieve Barbot of her position. (She ultimately resigned on August 4.)

On March 7, 2020, Governor Cuomo declared a state of emergency in New York State after 89 cases had been confirmed in the state, 70 of them in Westchester County, 12 in New York City, and 7 elsewhere.

On April 20, 2020, de Blasio announced that major events had been cancelled through June, including the Pride March and the Puerto Rican Day Parade.

On August 5, 2020, de Blasio announced that COVID-19 checkpoints would be set up at major crossings and tunnels to help enforcement of a mandatory 14-day quarantine for travelers from areas of a high transmission rate per Cuomo's order, in coordination with the New York's Sheriff department. Failure to comply with this order would result in fines ranging from $2,000 to $10,000 with de Blasio adding, "We're not going to let our hard work slip away and will continue to do everything we can to keep New Yorkers safe and healthy."

In preparation for the 2025–2026 respiratory virus season, the New York City Health Department transitioned to an integrated guidance model, recommending the updated 2025–2026 COVID-19 vaccine for all residents aged 6 months and older alongside seasonal influenza and RSV immunizations.

On October 3, 2025, Governor Kathy Hochul extended an Executive Order allowing New Yorkers to receive the updated 2025–26 COVID-19 vaccine without a prescription from a physician. This measure was designed to maintain low-barrier access to immunizations following federal changes to vaccine procurement.

In September 2025, New York City joined the newly formed "Northeast Public Health Collaborative," a partnership between several regional states and the city to coordinate public health data, strengthen vaccine supply chains, and streamline communication for respiratory virus monitoring.

=== Stay-at-home order ===
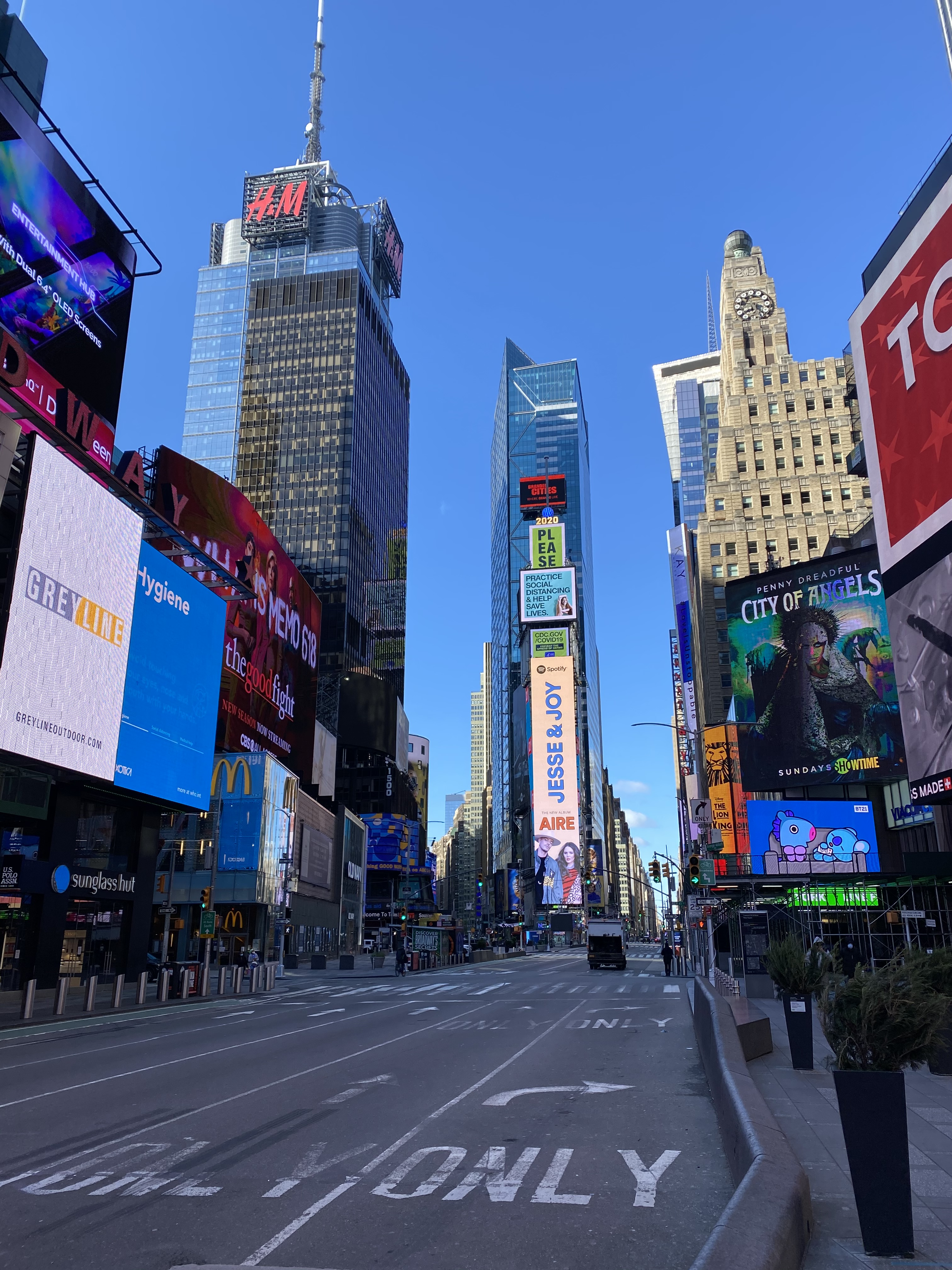
A nearly empty street at Times Square, New York City, during the pandemic, May 2020

On March 14, 2020, before the statewide stay-at-home order (also known as the "New York State on PAUSE" executive order) was put in place, all New York Public Library branches in the Bronx, Manhattan, and Staten Island were temporarily closed. The Queens Public Library and Brooklyn Public Library were also closed. Theaters, concert venues, and nightclubs in NYC were shut down starting March 17, and restaurants were restricted to take-out and delivery only. Schools were closed from March 16 until at least April 20. Gyms were closed as well.

On March 17, despite de Blasio's message to New Yorkers that they should be "prepared right now" for the possibility of "shelter in place" orders, Cuomo expressed doubts about whether the policy would be effective. The governor's office issued a statement that the shelter in place order could only be put in place by the governor's office; the Mayor's office agreed. On March 20, with 5,683 confirmed cases in NYC, the governor's office issued the PAUSE order that would go into effect on March 22 at 8 PM. The order put in place the following restrictions, summarized in the executive order in ten points:

1. Effective at 8pm on Sunday, March 22, all non-essential businesses statewide will be closed;
2. Non-essential gatherings of individuals of any size for any reason (e.g. parties, celebrations or other social events) are canceled or postponed at this time;
3. Any concentration of individuals outside their home must be limited to workers providing essential services and social distancing should be practiced;
4. When in public individuals must practice social distancing of at least six feet from others;
5. Businesses and entities that provide other essential services must implement rules that help facilitate social distancing of at least six feet;
6. Individuals should limit outdoor recreational activities to non-contact and avoid activities where they come in close contact with other people;
7. Individuals should limit use of public transportation to when absolutely necessary and should limit potential exposure by spacing out at least six feet from other riders;
8. Sick individuals should not leave their home unless to receive medical care and only after a telehealth visit to determine if leaving the home is in the best interest of their health;
9. Young people should also practice social distancing and avoid contact with vulnerable populations;
10. Use precautionary sanitizer practices such as using isopropyl alcohol wipes.

The governor said the provisions would be enforced. Businesses that violated the order faced fines and closure. Businesses that qualified as "essential businesses" under the stay-at-home order included but were not limited to:

- utility companies
- banks
- pharmacies
- laundromats
- gas stations
- grocers, restaurants, and convenience stores
- liquor stores
- hardware stores
- auto repair shops
- delivery services
- skilled contractors like plumbers
- health care providers
- warehouses
- manufacturers
- construction companies
- animal-care providers

On April 6, the statewide PAUSE order was extended through April 29. The rate of increase had slowed from 10,000 new confirmed cases daily to 8,700. Intubation and ICU admission rates were slowing. Fines for violating social distancing protocols were increased from $500 to $1,000. On April 16, the statewide PAUSE order was extended through May 15, in coordination with the newly established "Eastern States Multi-state Council".

=== Four-phase reopening plan ===
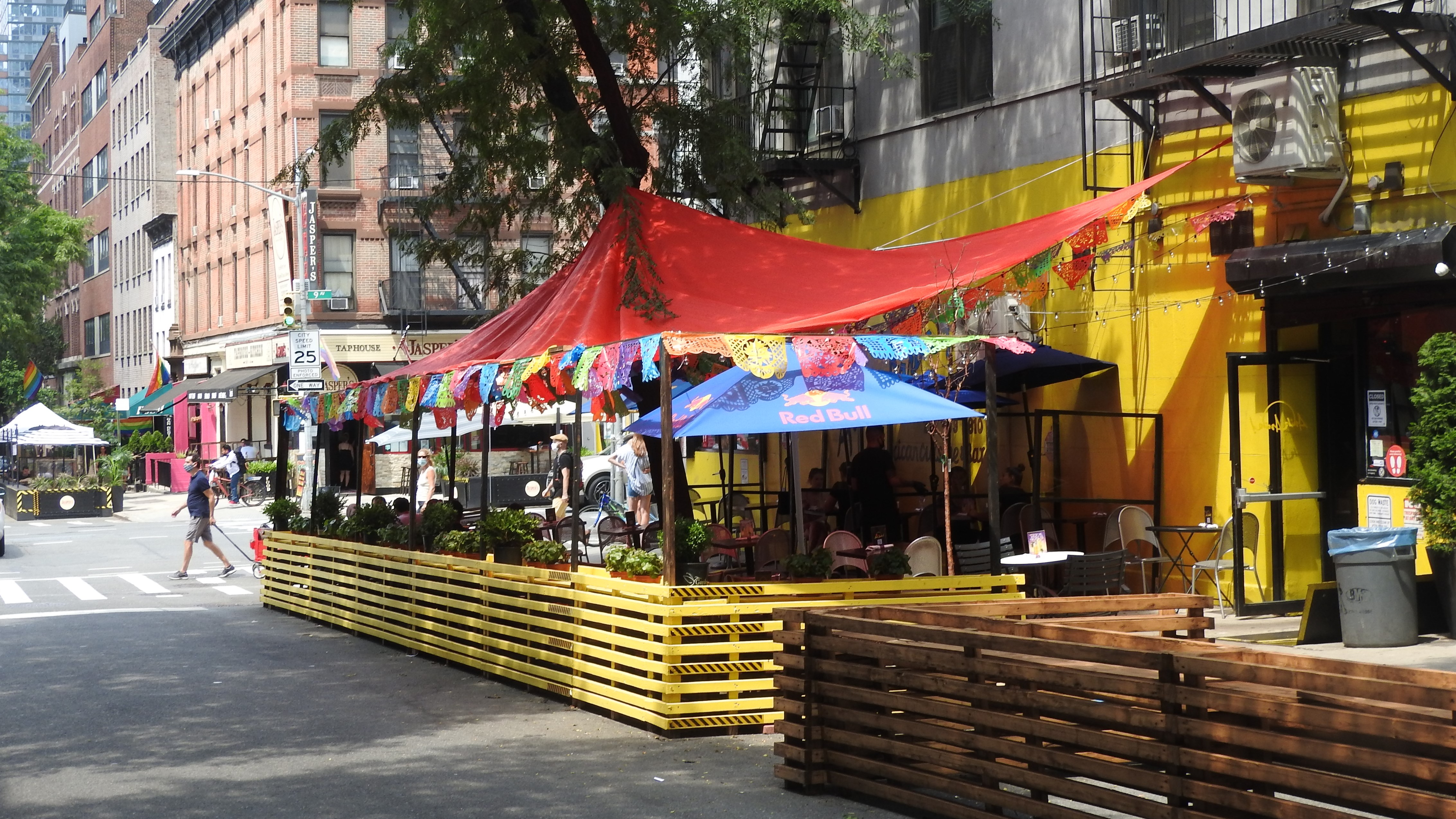
Restaurants with street dining corrals, August 2020

Governor Andrew Cuomo first announced a four-phase reopening plan for businesses on May 7, 2020. In order for the New York City region to begin reopening in Phase 1, it needed to meet these seven metrics:

- 14-day decline in hospitalizations or under 15 new hospitalizations (3-day average)
- 14-day decline in hospitalized deaths or under 5 new (3-day average)
- New hospitalizations — under 2 per 100,000 residents (3-day rolling average)
- Share of total beds available (threshold of 30 percent)
- Share of ICU beds available (threshold of 30 percent)
- 30 per 1,000 residents tested monthly (7-day average of new tests per day)
- 30 contact tracers per 100,000 residents or to meet current infection rate.

As of July 20, 2020, the four-phase reopening plan for New York City was detailed as follows:

- Phase 1: construction, manufacturing, agriculture, forestry, fishing, and select retail that can offer curbside pickup.
- Phase 2: outdoor dining at restaurants, hair salons and barber shops, offices, real estate firms, in-store retail, vehicle sales, retail rental, repair services, cleaning services, and commercial building management.
- Phase 3: indoor dining at restaurants and bars at 50% capacity (excluding New York City) and personal care services.
- Phase 4: low-risk outdoor activities at 33% capacity (outdoor zoos, botanical gardens, nature parks, historical sites, outdoor museums, etc.); low-risk indoor activities at 25% capacity are allowed in Phase 4 regions outside of New York City.

Some types of businesses, such as drive-in theaters, landscaping and gardening, and places of worship, were allowed to reopen regardless of the phase as part of a separate executive order. On May 14, 2020, Governor Cuomo issued an executive order to extend the PAUSE order through May 28 for New York City and other regions that did not meet the state's requirements to begin Phase 1 of reopening. A week later, it still had only met four of seven reopening conditions.

Phase 1 of reopening in New York City began on June 8, 2020. In total, between 200,000 and 400,000 people were expected to return to work during Phase 1. On June 22, 2020, the region moved to Phase 2 with an expected 300,000 returning to work. Cuomo announced in late June that shopping malls would need to install virus-filtering air conditioning systems before reopening. On July 6, 2020, New York City entered Phase 3, excluding indoor dining. On July 20, 2020, the region entered Phase 4.

On August 17, 2020, Cuomo announced gyms and fitness centers would be able to reopen starting August 24 and no later than September 2. Gyms would be required to limit their capacity to 33%, mandate mask wearing at all times, and maintain proper ventilation systems.

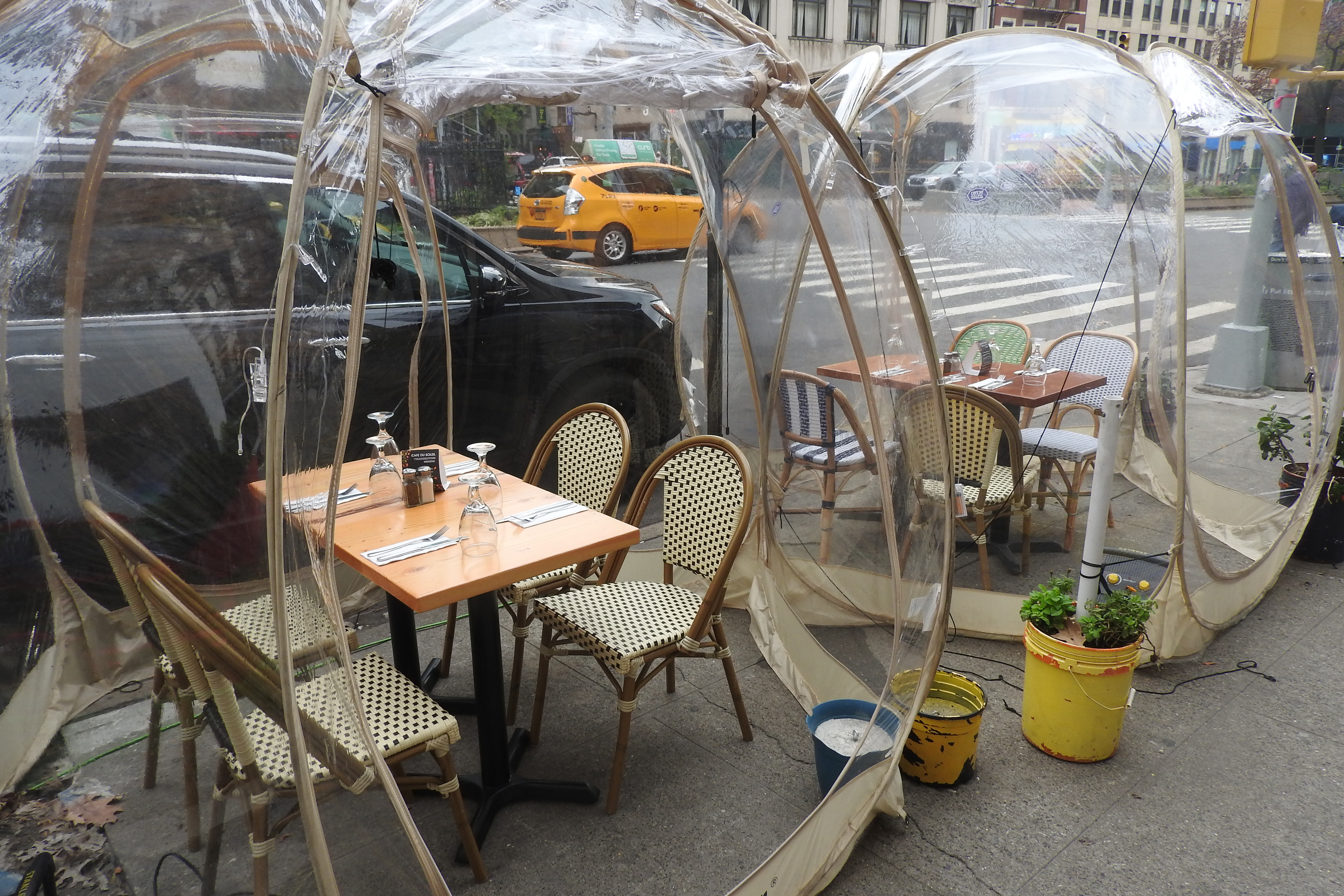
Bubble booths on Broadway sidewalk, in November

In a press conference on September 9, 2020, Cuomo announced New York City would be permitted to resume indoor dining services at 25 percent capacity on September 30.

=== Social distancing and face masks ===
Social distancing has been recommended nationwide by the Centers for Disease Control and Prevention (CDC) and World Health Organization since COVID-19 was first declared a national health emergency in March 2020. It was mandated by Cuomo on March 20, 2020 as part of the statewide stay-at-home order.

In early March 2020, the New York Legislature granted Cuomo the power to temporarily suspend laws or create new laws to fight the pandemic. Face masks were first mandated by law via an executive order issued by Cuomo on April 15, 2020. The order states that face masks must be in all public places when social distancing is not possible, as when people are within six feet of others. On May 28, 2020, another executive order gave business owners the authority to decide whether patrons must wear a face covering to enter.

On May 17, 2021, Governor Cuomo announced the adoption of the new CDC guidelines on mask and social distancing for vaccinated people by May 19. On May 21, 2021, the NYC Health Department issued guidelines on face coverings for vaccinated and unvaccinated individuals. Fully vaccinated people can forego wearing a mask during certain situations, especially outdoor activities. However, face coverings are still required when riding public transportation, in schools or health care facilities, in certain residential facilities, and in stores and restaurants at the discretion of the owner, among other activities.

=== Micro-cluster strategy ===
Governor Andrew Cuomo introduced a micro-cluster strategy on October 6, 2020, to help prevent the spread of COVID-19. This strategy involved systematically monitoring data, identifying potential areas of concern, and defining specific geographic focus areas. These cluster areas would be even more closely monitored and, in accordance with pre-defined metrics, would implement restrictions and increase community testing in clusters with high viral transmission. Depending on the current metrics, the clusters may be zoned into one of three levels of restrictions, which consisted of the following:

- Red zone: prohibited social gatherings, allowed only essential businesses open (except for places of worship that could have a maximum of 10 people), takeout/delivery only, and limited schools to remote learning only
- Orange zone (warning zone): limited social gatherings to 10 people, allowed outdoor dining only with 4 people maximum per table, closed high-risk non-essential businesses, and limited schools to remote learning only
- Yellow zone (precautionary zone): limited social gatherings to 25 people, dining to 4 people per table, and required mandatory weekly testing for schools

The original micro-cluster strategy applied additional restrictions until various lawsuits lifted them. Court rulings ended the harshest restrictions for places of worship on November 26, for schools on December 1, for gyms and salons on December 11, and for restaurants and bars on January 13, 2021.

=== Public transport ===
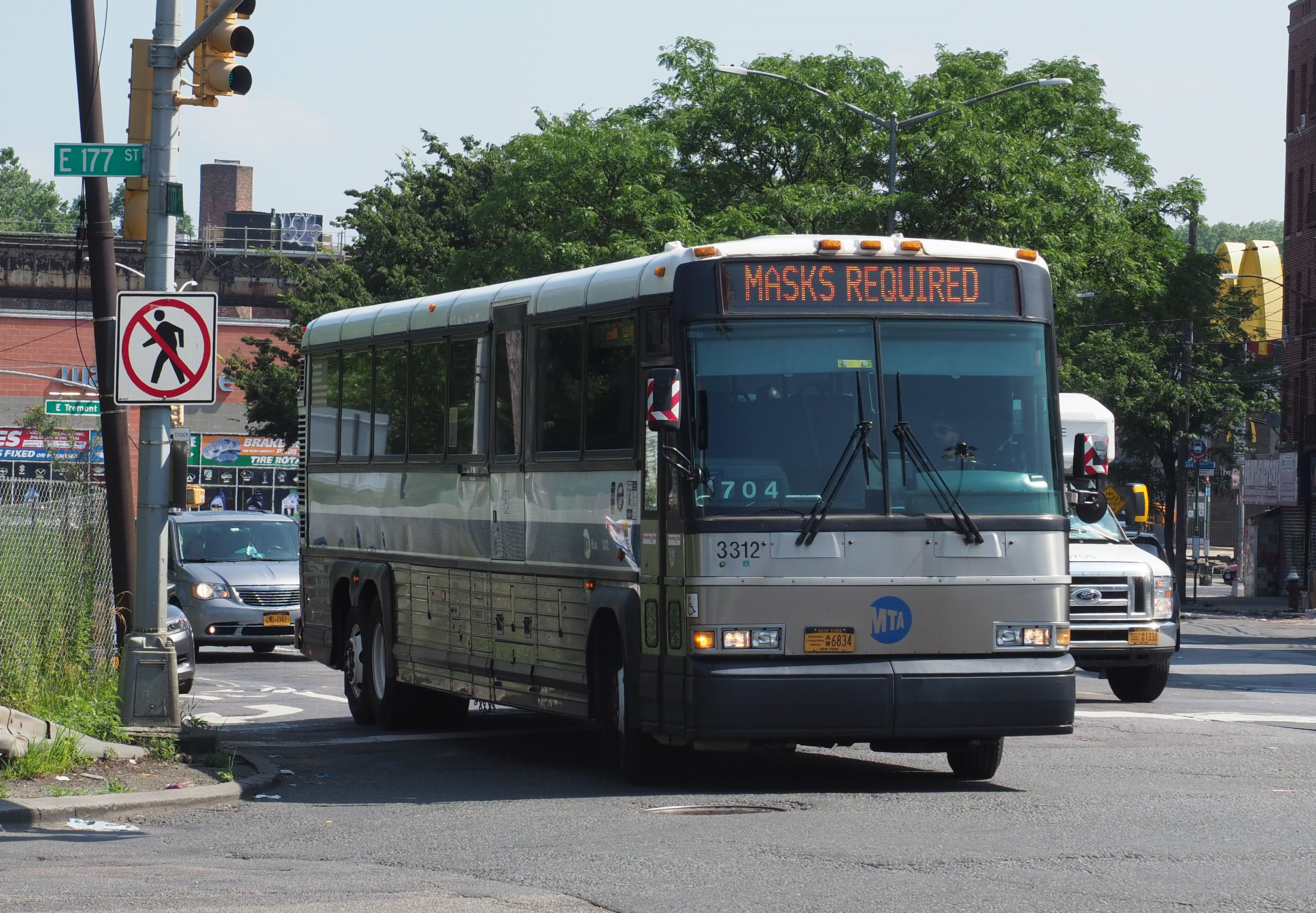
New York City Transit bus at 177th Street near Devoe Ave, Bronx, NY. Route sign reads, "Masks Required"

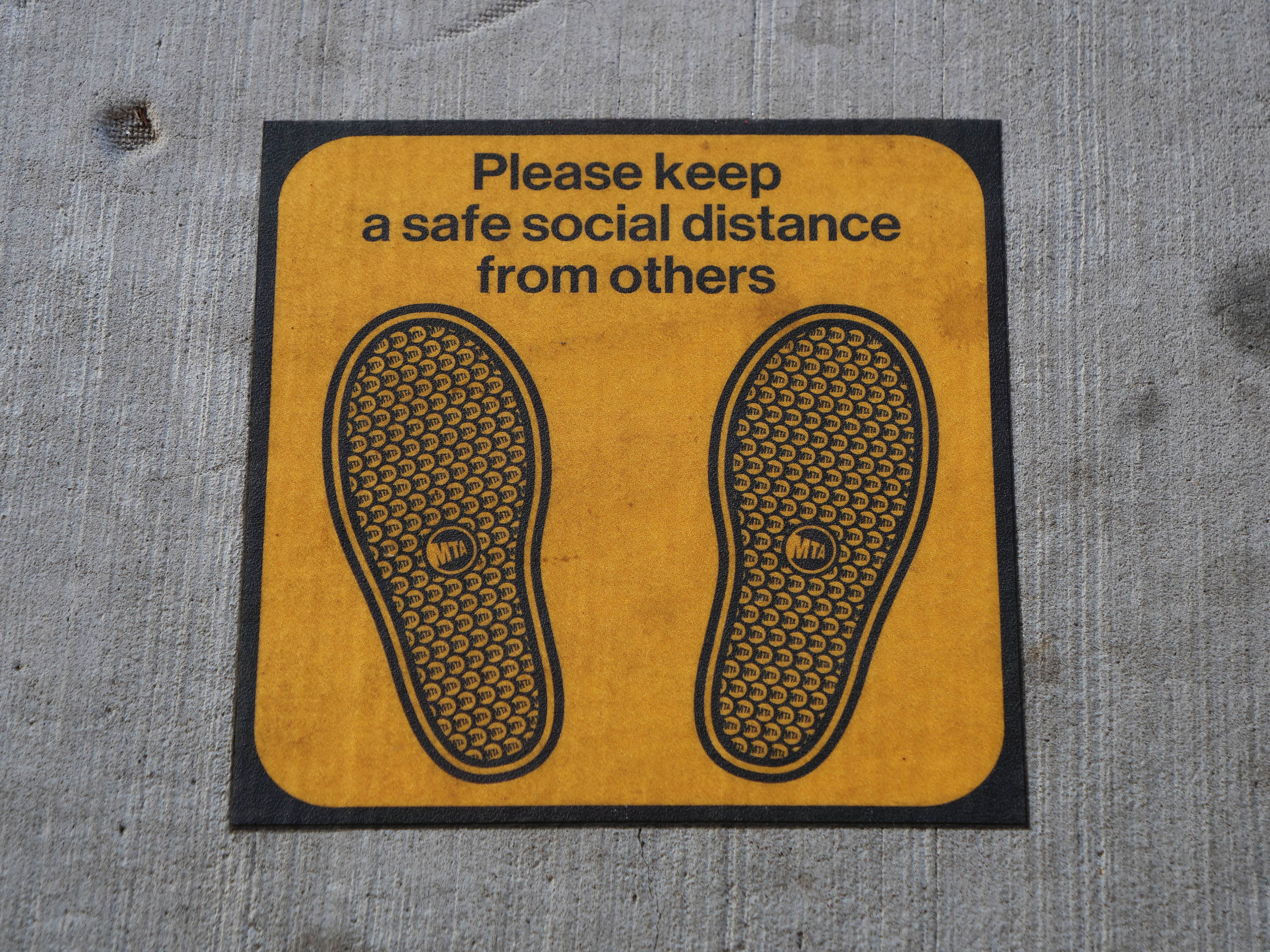
These stickers have been placed six feet apart from one another on the platforms of nearly all subway stations

New York City issued new commuter guidelines following the start of the outbreak, asking sick individuals to stay off public transit, and encouraging citizens to avoid densely packed buses, subways, and trains. Beginning March 25, 2020 service on buses, subways, and commuter rail was reduced due to decreased ridership. Ridership had decreased by 92% on April 8, when 41 Metropolitan Transportation Authority (MTA) workers had died. By April 22, 2020, COVID-19 had killed 83 agency employees; that number had increased to 131 by late August. The agency announced that their families would be eligible for $500,000 in death benefits.

On April 20, four City Council members requested that subway service be temporarily suspended, saying that reduced service had resulted in crowding on the subway and that entire cars had been taken over by homeless people. Their request to shut down the subway was initially rejected by the governor's office and criticized by interim New York City Transit President Sarah Feinberg. City officials made efforts to place high-risk homeless persons in hotels serving as emergency shelters.

Starting in May 2020, subway service and stations were closed overnight for cleaning, as a temporary measure that would end when the pandemic improved sufficiently. On June 8, 2020, regular subway and bus service resumed with Phase 1 of the city's reopening, though the overnight subway closure remained in place. Although officials stated that only one percent of subway ridership occurred at night, there were complaints that essential workers were being unnecessarily inconvenienced. Internal MTA sources stated that it was theoretically possible for the MTA to clean the system without closing it. In February 2021, the overnight closures were shortened to between 2 and 4 a.m. An app feature was added to the MYmta app in July 2020 to give riders real time information about the number of riders on buses.

By September 2020, over 170 transit workers had reported being assaulted or harassed for asking passengers to wear face masks, including a 62-year-old bus driver who was knocked unconscious on his route through East New York, Brooklyn, prompting officials to implement a $50 fine for riders who refused to wear a face mask. Sarah Feinberg says the fine is "a last resort" for people who refuse masks after they are offered.

Jeffrey E. Harris, a member of the economics faculty at MIT, said service cuts "most likely accelerated the spread of coronavirus". In his study published on April 15, 2020, he argued that public transportation was a "major disseminator" of novel coronavirus in New York City. The MTA said the study was "flawed – period". The advice to continue taking public transportation given by city officials during the early stages of the pandemic is now believed to have contributed to the intensity of the outbreak in New York City.

Α report published by the Daily News on September 29, 2020 asserted that there was "no correlation" between mass transit and COVID-19 infection rates. The MTA did not report any deaths between June and September 2020, but lost at least 131 employees to COVID-19 during the first three months of the pandemic. On October 4, the Daily News reported that an epidemiologist affiliated with Yale University recommended that the MTA should advise riders not to talk to reduce the risk from spreading infectious aerosols. The MTA issued a statement that they were considering "all options".

Subway ridership increased slowly in the early months of 2021 but not enough to reach pre-pandemic levels. On September 7, 2022, following Governor Hochul's decision to end the statewide transit mask mandate due to Omicron-specific boosters and stabilizing infection rates, the MTA revised its guidelines to say that masks were "encouraged but optional" throughout the system.

=== Education ===
On March 8, 2020, all NYC school trips were canceled. On March 13, de Blasio stated that he would keep the schools open, citing the need for school meal programs and child care to continue. On March 15, all schools in the New York City Department of Education (NYCDOE) system closed until at least mid-April.

On April 11, 2020, de Blasio ordered all schools to remain closed for the rest of the academic year, while Cuomo insisted that the authority to close and reopen schools throughout the state belonged to himself as the governor, not to de Blasio or any other mayor. On May 1, Governor Cuomo announced that all schools would be closed for the academic year and continue to provide distance education.

On July 2, 2020, de Blasio announced that schools would be opening in September. Cuomo's office said the final decision will be made by the governor's office, based on the infection rate in the state: "You can't open a school if the virus is on the increase." New York City said that full remote learning would be an option even if schools do reopen.

As of July 30, 2020, the city was planning for 2 to 3 days of classroom instruction per week, with remote learning on other days. School staff would be tested for COVID-19 before the start of the school year. There were plans for confirmed cases:

1. If there were one to two confirmed cases in the same class, the class would switch to full-time remote learning while the students and staff self-quarantined for two weeks.
2. If there were two or more confirmed cases in multiple classes in one school, the entire school would close and switch to full-time remote learning. Contact tracers would investigate.

On August 7, 2020, Cuomo announced schools could open in the fall if they publicly disclosed plans to address remote learning, testing of virus, and tracing procedures. Of the state's 749 school districts, 127 had not submitted plans, and 50 had submitted incomplete or deficient ones to the Department of Health, including the New York City region, which "disappointed" the Governor. This came the same day for a deadline for parents in New York City to choose entirely blended or entirely remote learning for their children. On August 10, de Blasio with officials from NYCDOE gave details on their reopening plan in a news conference before the August 14 deadline set by the State.

In preparation of the first day of classes, the city deployed School Ventilation Teams to inspect public school buildings for problems with windows and supply and exhaust fans. Any rooms that did not meet the ventilation requirements would not be used. Some schools applied for outdoor learning space. Around 25% of students opted for all-remote learning.

On September 1, 2020, Mayor de Blasio and teacher unions reached an agreement to start remote and in-person classes on September 21, ten days later than originally scheduled.

On September 17, 2020, de Blasio announced the shift of the start of the school year again, opting for a phased approach, due to continued obstacles including teacher shortages. Pre-K and students with special needs would begin on September 21, elementary schools on September 29, and middle/high schools on October 1.

New targeted closures were put in place in October 2020 as clusters with daily rates above city thresholds were identified. All public and private schools in "red zones" were ordered to switch to remote learning for 14 days, but some private schools refused to comply with the order, prompting the governor's office to issue an executive order that schools refusing to comply with closures would lose their funding.

Schools were closed again on November 19, 2020 after the city reached a seven-day rolling average positivity rate of 3%. Some criticized the decision to close schools without also restricting indoor dining and gyms.

For the 2021–2022 academic year, teachers and staff were required to be vaccinated.

==== Colleges and universities ====
During the pandemic, the majority of New York City colleges and universities transitioned to primarily virtual or hybrid instructional programs. In-person classes were possible following New York State instructions and safety protocols.

=== Parks ===
On April 1, 2020, Cuomo ordered all playgrounds in the city to be shut down in order to promote social distancing. Parks would mostly remain open. The exceptions were Fort Totten in Queens, which was closed to provide a staging area for first responders, and the High Line, which was closed because it is a linear park with few means to spread out. Sports fields and facilities were also closed, as were the historic-house museums operated by the New York City Department of Parks and Recreation. With the start of the summer season in May, public beaches remained closed as well.

On May 7, 2020, de Blasio said that entry to public parks may be limited to prevent overcrowding and to promote social distancing. It was later announced that access might also be limited within parts of parks, such as Sheep Meadow at Central Park. On July 1, the city's public beaches were opened. On July 16, the High Line reopened to the public with free timed-entry passes in order to limit capacity and allow social distancing. For the summer 2020 season, several pools reopened with limited capacity in July and August.

=== Open space ===
==== Open streets ====
On April 27, 2020, de Blasio announced plans to convert 40 to 100 miles (64 to 161 km) of streets to open streets. The affected streets would be closed to through traffic and blocked-off by temporary wooden or metal barricades with NYC Department of Transportation (DOT) signage. The purpose of the Open Streets is to provide "the space for essential workers to pursue safer commuting options, provide outdoor opportunities for vulnerable New Yorkers, and give families the chance to play beyond the four walls of their home". The totals reached 44 miles (71 km) in May 2020 and 67 miles (108 km) in June 2020.

The program has been largely successful, but has received some criticism from transit activists due to the poor enforcement and upkeep of barricades, the choice of segments which are too-short or border existing parks, and racial and socio-economic disparity in street choice and upkeep.

==== Open restaurants ====
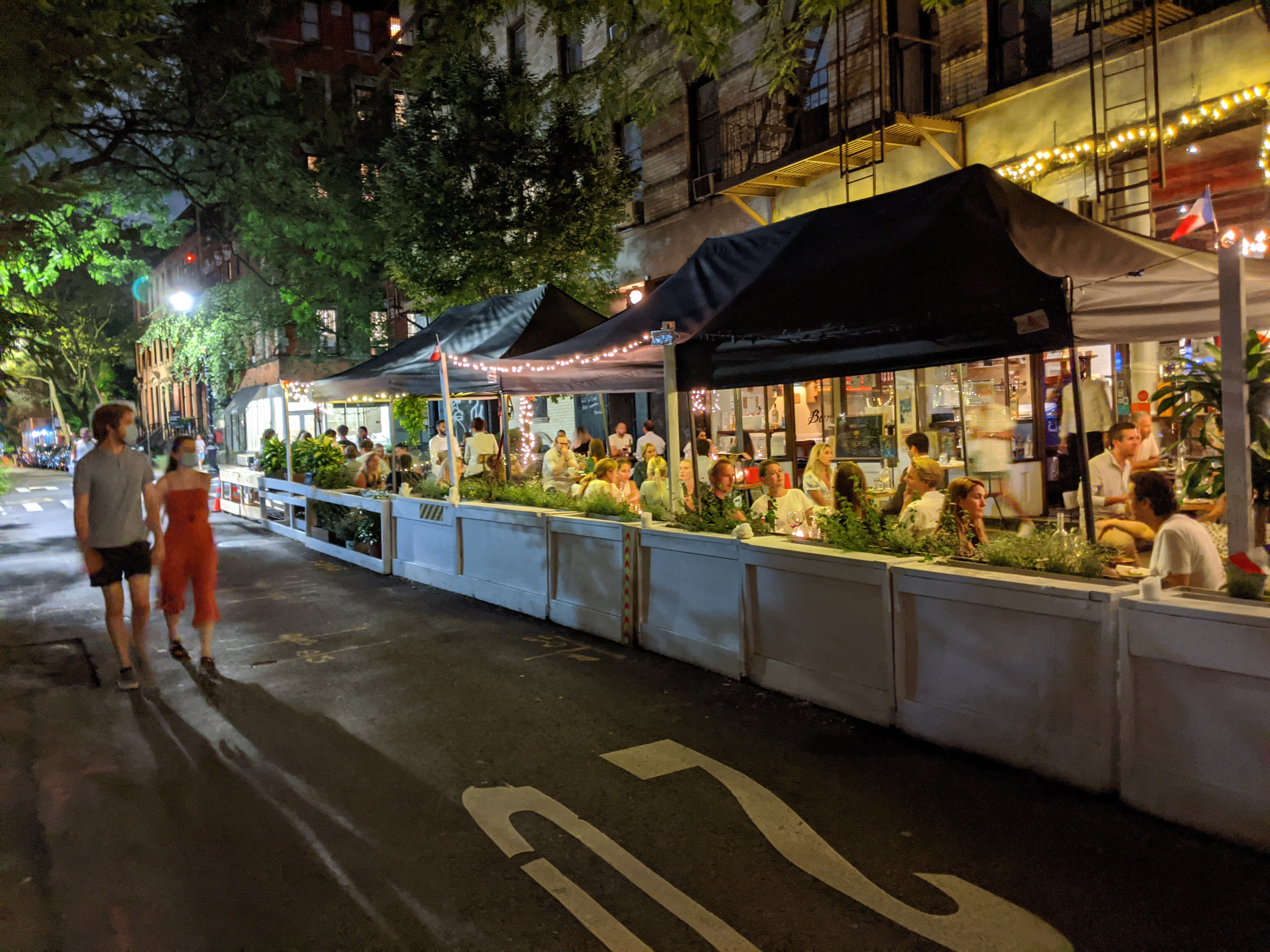
Masked New Yorkers walk by a restaurant providing outdoor dining under Open Restaurants

On June 22, 2020, the city initiated the Open Restaurants program, permitting restaurants to apply to use the sidewalk or curb lane adjacent to their business for outdoor dining, in order to promote open space, encourage social distancing, and help businesses economically recover. By September 5, 10,000 restaurants had participated. Additionally, starting in July, some of the open streets were made available for outdoor dining from Friday through Sunday.

On September 25, 2020, de Blasio in an interview with WNYC announced the outdoor dining and open streets programs would be extended indefinitely. The Open Restaurants program had been set to expire on October 31.

=== Temporary burials ===
COVID-19 burials on Hart Island

On April 6, 2020, The New York Times reported that the city's overall death rate had tripled and that morgues were overwhelmed. After councilman Mark D. Levine tweeted that temporary interment "likely will be done by using a NYC park for burials", NYC officials said they were not considering temporary burials in city parks.

The mayor's press secretary said that a next resort could be to store or bury bodies on Hart Island off the coast of the Bronx in the Long Island Sound. Following reports that mass burials had begun there, the mayor clarified that Hart Island was only being used for unclaimed bodies or for those who chose it as a burial place. Bodies are ordinarily held at the city's morgues anywhere from 30 to 60 days, but to make room for the influx of deceased individuals during the pandemic, the city's medical examiner's office announced a new policy of holding unclaimed bodies for only up to 15 days before they are transferred to the island.

On April 29, 2020, authorities discovered dozens of decomposing bodies in two trucks parked outside a funeral home in Brooklyn.

== Economic impact ==
=== Unemployment and loss of revenue ===
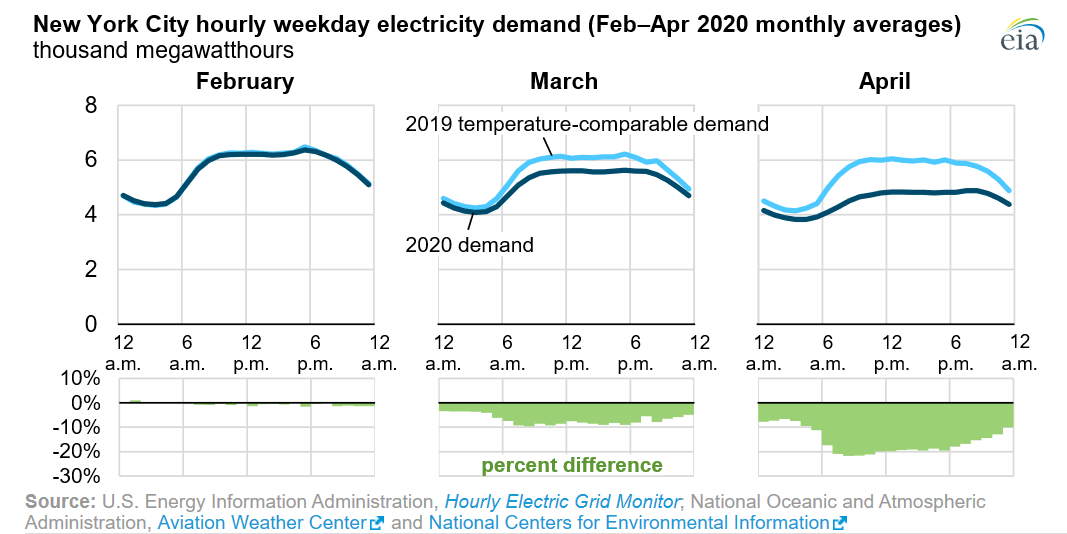
Change in New York City electrical usage, February–April 2020

By April 2020, The New York Times reported that hundreds of thousands of New Yorkers were unemployed, with at least $7.4 billion lost tax revenue projected over the year, and many residents uncertain as to how their rents would be paid. Broadway theaters, restaurants, hotels, and the transit system were among the most affected, while construction and real-estate development activities halted. Law firms, financial services companies, and other white-collar businesses expected declining profits or losses. Between 475,000 and 1.2 million jobs, mostly low-wage positions in the retail, transportation, and restaurant sectors, were expected to be cut by the end of April.

By August 2020, the city had an official unemployment rate of 16.3%, nearly twice the national rate. A significant percentage of populations in all five boroughs were estimated to be receiving unemployment insurance benefits, with rates ranging from 22% of the workforce in Manhattan to 41% in the Bronx. Officially, the Bronx had an unemployment rate of 17.5% in October, the highest of any county in the state at the time. The city's most badly affected neighborhood was West Farms, Bronx, where 26% of the workforce was unemployed in October 2020, several times higher than in wealthy neighborhoods such as the Upper West Side and Upper East Side of Manhattan.

The drop in income, sales tax, and tourism revenues including hotel tax revenue may cost the city up to $10 billion according to the Mayor's office. De Blasio said "We're not going to be able to provide basic services and actually have a normal society if we don't get help from the federal government." According to the New York City Independent Budget Office, a full economic recovery might not be achieved until 2024.

=== Business closures ===
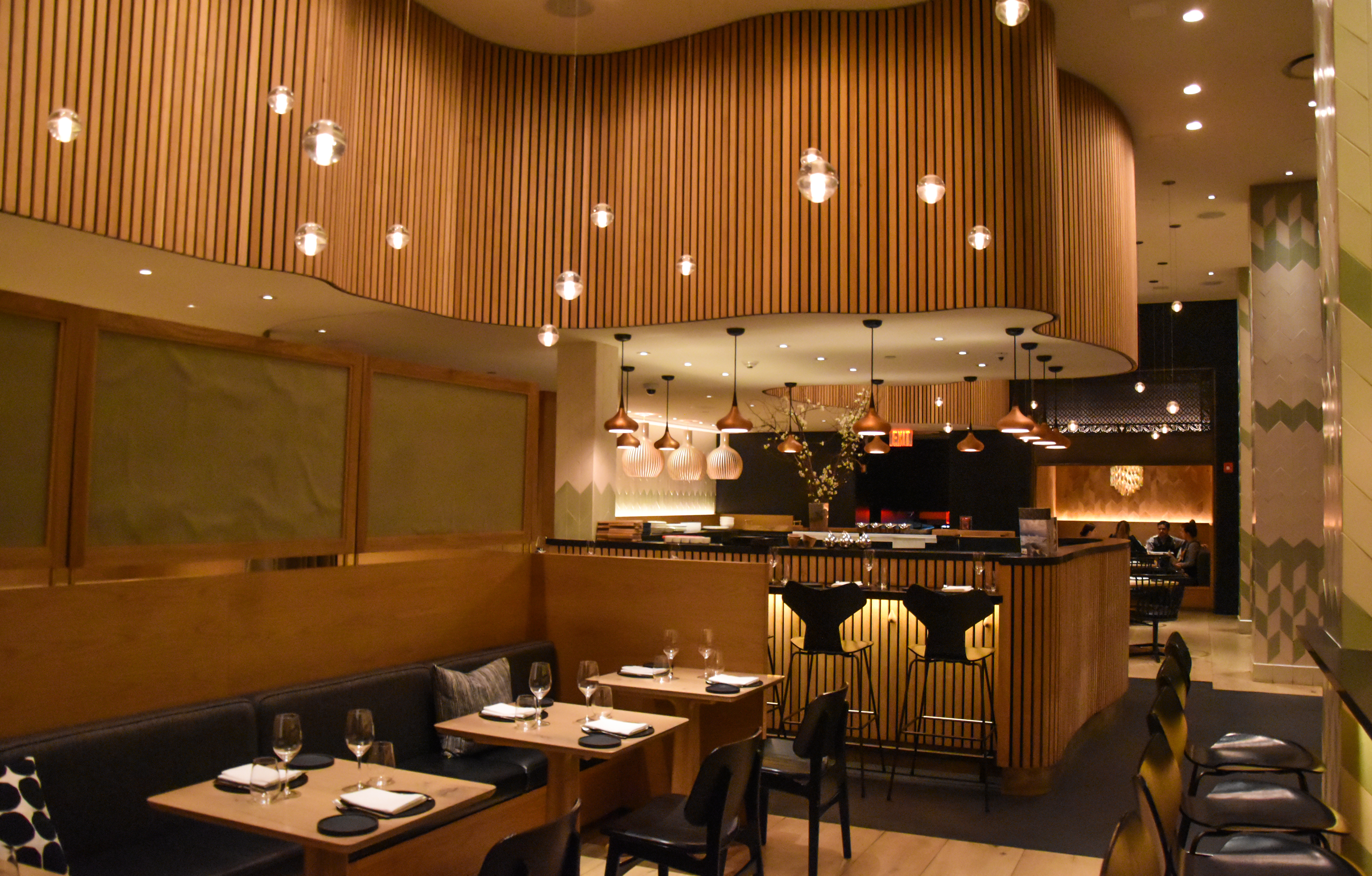
Agern, a one-Michelin-star restaurant in Grand Central Terminal, permanently closed due to the pandemic

Many stores and restaurants have closed permanently. Record Mart, the oldest record store in the city, announced that its shop in the Times Square–42nd Street station's mezzanine would not be reopening. A quarter of retail businesses operating in the subway permanently closed between March and November 2020. Other notable businesses that have closed permanently include Momofuku, the Copacabana nightclub, the Gem Spa, and two locations of Gimme! Coffee. As of July 16, 2020, four Michelin-starred restaurants had announced permanent closures: Gotham Bar and Grill, Nix, Jewel Bako and Ukiyo. In August 2020, The New York Times estimated that up to 80,000 small businesses might never reopen, eliminating jobs for up to 520,000 people and representing one-third of the total number of small businesses in operation before the pandemic. At the time, 2,800 small businesses had already closed permanently, a third of which were restaurants. The pandemic caused many businesses to close in NYC, however in some 2022 reports, Manhattan was shown to have the sharpest decline of businesses with a loss of 5,266 businesses since the pandemic started, but oppositely Brooklyn has gained more new businesses with an increase of 1,267 businesses during that time period. City Limits reported that Manhattan's share of private business establishments plummeted to below 50%.

Numerous bars closed as a result of the pandemic, including Pegu Club, which was one of the pioneering establishments in the cocktail renaissance.

=== Real estate ===
Before the pandemic, the three largest metropolitan areas in the U.S., including New York City, had been losing population for several years. High rents and cost of living in the city contributed to slowing growth by the mid-2010s, as salary in the city was no longer competitive after adjusting for the cost of living. Some residents have questioned whether the high rents can be justified while public spaces, theaters and other event venues remain closed. Employees who have been furloughed from corporate jobs at institutions like Macy's may not renew their lease agreements. Realtors have reported an increase in inquiries about suburban home purchases and rentals from residents of Manhattan and other densely populated urban centers.

In July 2020, according to StreetEasy, there were more than 67,300 vacant rental units in New York City, the highest number since 2010. The median rental price in Manhattan dropped 10% from July 2019 to $3,167 per month. Although there was an increase in people moving out of the city during the pandemic, the increase in vacancies was also attributed to the fact that real-estate agents were also unable to show houses between March and June. A smaller number of buyers and renters decided to move in during the pandemic as well; between April and July, market data showed that almost 700 buyers from around the world finalized contracts for apartments in Manhattan.

The pandemic also affected commercial real estate, as most office workers started remote work. Even after office buildings were allowed to reopen in June 2020 during Phase 2 of reopening, less than one-tenth of the city's office workers had gone back to their workplaces by August. According to an article in The New York Times in September 2020, only one-fourth of large employers anticipated that their employees would return to their offices by December, while 54% expected their employees to return by the following July. Many office workers were planning for permanent remote work. Commercial office leases in the first eight months of 2020 decreased sharply from the previous year. By December 2020, commercial rents along retail corridors in Manhattan had declined 13 percent from the previous year, and 14 percent of Midtown Manhattan office space was vacant.

An emergency moratorium on eviction or foreclosure was extended until May 2021, for New York state residents who could document "COVID-related hardship".

=== Recovery ===
One year into the pandemic, a broad measure of the city's economic recovery was about halfway back to its pre-pandemic level. Vaccinated international visitors from several countries were allowed back into the U.S. in November 2021. Two weeks after the restriction was lifted, The New York Times reported that tourism had begun to rise, though numbers were still far below 2019 figures.

In early 2023, as the city was in the process of lifting the last of its pandemic-era programs and policies, Mayor Adams confronted a more long-lasting shift in attitudes toward remote work, leading to a reversal of his remote work policy, implemented in February 2022, that originally favored a full-scale return to in-person work. Instead, after the city struggled to fill job vacancies due to a refusal to allow remote or hybrid work, Adams announced on February 14 that he had tasked city agencies with discovering "creative ways of having flexibility". Remote and hybrid policies remained controversial, due to a loss of roughly $12 billion in revenue per year from hybrid work in Manhattan and a so-called two-tiered system of work, in which some workers were privileged to work from home and others did not have such a choice due to the nature of their jobs.

== Social impact ==
=== Social distancing ===
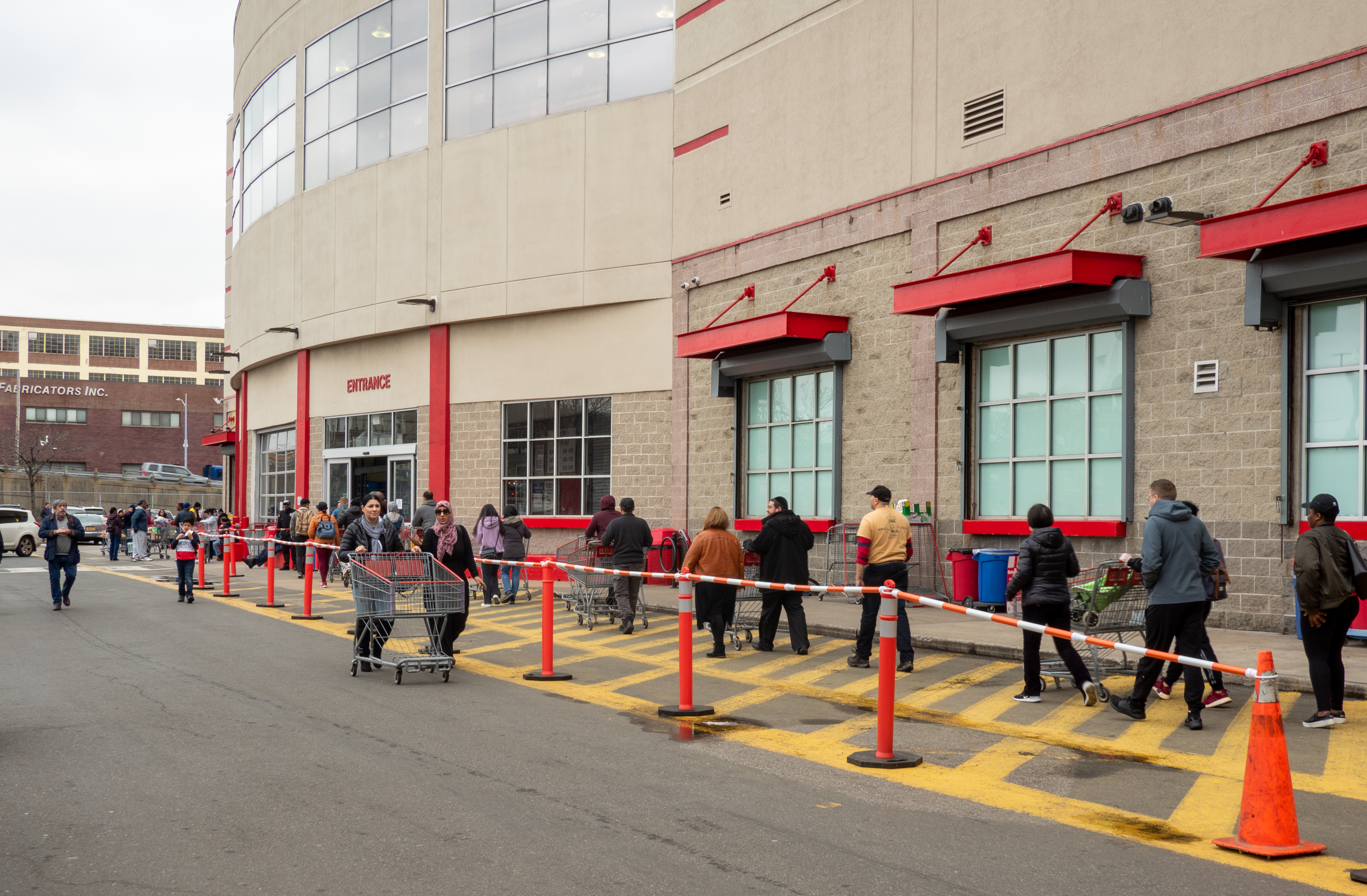
Line at Costco in Brooklyn on March 19, 2020

On March 30, 2020, the mayor announced that most religious buildings had shut down in accordance with quarantine regulations. However, he warned that some churches and synagogues were not in compliance and would be shut down by authorities if they remained open. Several summonses and arrests were made for violating social distancing rules. On March 28, a Brooklyn bar owner was arrested for defying Cuomo's shutdown of indoor bars and restaurants. On April 3, the NYPD broke up a party in the Bronx where several dozen people had gathered in violation of social distancing rules. On April 7, NBC News reported violations of the statewide PAUSE order throughout the city, and de Blasio said violations of the order could be reported to 311.

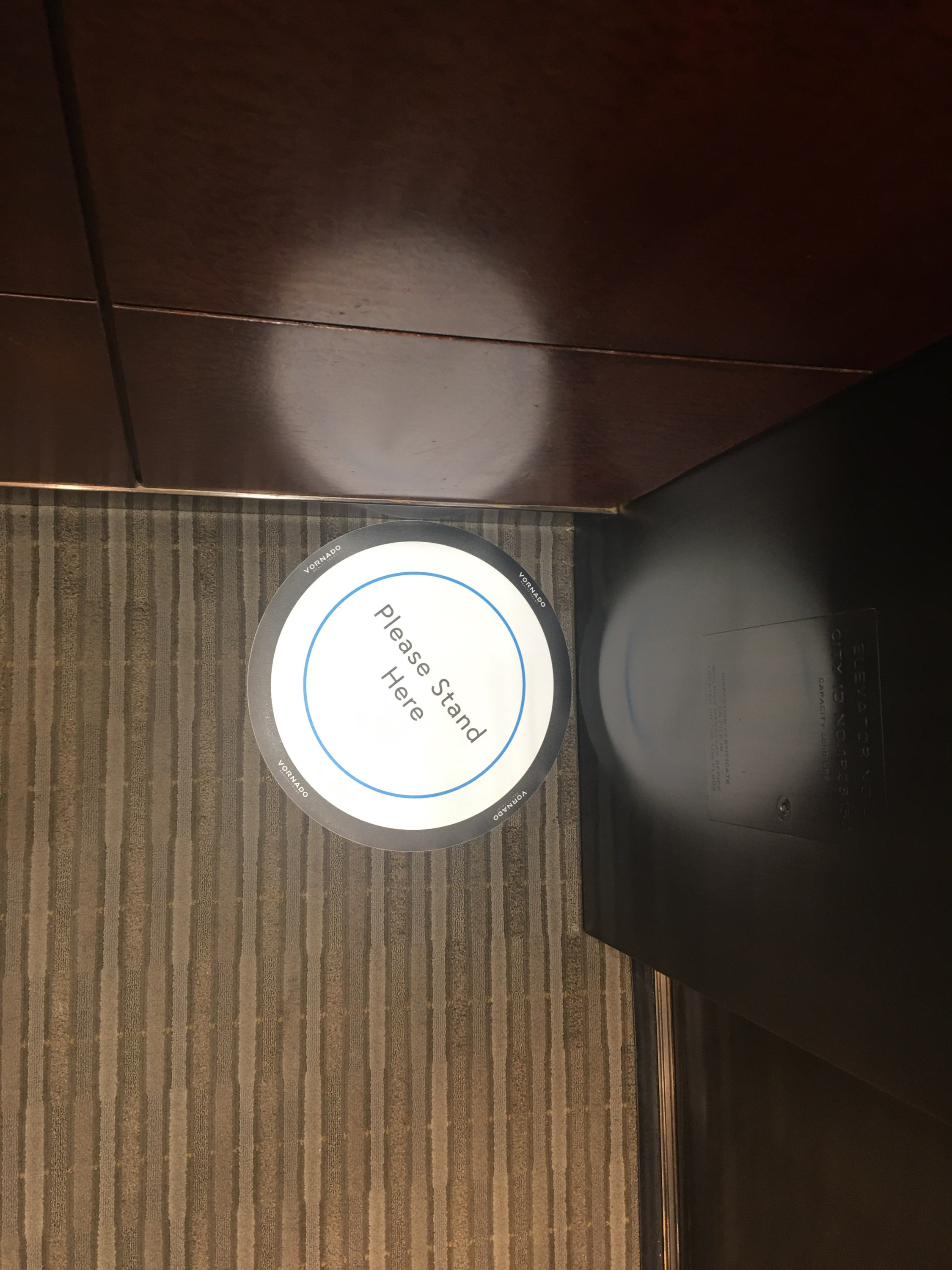
Social distancing marker inside an elevator in a building in Manhattan - July 2020

One epidemiologist at Columbia University noted "Social distancing is a privilege that not everybody has equal opportunity to practice." Of the five boroughs, Manhattan had reported the lowest rate of confirmed COVID-19 cases. Epidemiologists have observed that low-income communities were being disproportionately affected. Many residents of these neighborhoods work in essential jobs where it may not be possible to work from home.

After some arrests for violations of social distancing protocols turned violent, the city relaxed enforcement. As the weather warmed, large groups began gathering at parks and beaches. Some non-compliant bars and restaurants, limited to take-out and delivery service during the pandemic, continued allowing customers to dine in or to gather outside bars with drinks. De Blasio said non-compliant establishments risk closure.

During May and June 2020, fears arose of a second wave of COVID-19 accelerated by the George Floyd protests, close confinement of those detained, and poor rates of mask wearing by law enforcement. Several outlets criticized police working the events for failing to wear face masks as required by policy and order of the governor. As the number of arrests during the protests increased, many people were detained for longer periods, as hundreds were held in close quarters while waiting to see a judge. Some of the arrested also had inadequate access to water to wash their hands.

=== Police and crime ===
At the beginning of March, prior to the confirmation of the first case of COVID-19 in New York City, a 20 percent spike in crime for the first two months of 2020 was reported. After movement in the city became restricted, New York City Police Commissioner Dermot Shea stated that the pandemic had initially curtailed crime. At the end of March, Shea said that crime had decreased sharply (other than car theft, which increased markedly), though there was concern that domestic violence was not being reported.

By the end of the month, however, thousands of prisoners were released early to reduce their COVID-19 risk, 911 calls were at a record high, 1,048 officers and 145 civilian employees had tested positive for COVID-19, and more than 15% of uniformed officers were out sick, rising to nearly 20 percent on April 6. By April 30, 4,959 members of the NYPD had tested positive for the virus, and 37 had died.

Xenophobia and racism against Asians in the city increased due to the pandemic. Police investigated 11 anti-Asian hate crimes between January 1 and March 29, 2020, up from three during the same time period in the previous year.

Shootings nearly doubled in 2020 from 748 to 1,480, the highest number in 14 years. There were 436 murders, an increase of 40%. The cause is still being debated. Longtime city residents have complained of an increase in gang activity of the Bloods and Crips that has worsened since the city's stop-and-frisk program was ruled unconstitutional in Floyd v. City of New York. Members of the police force say it's a combination of factors including the early release of prisoners, bail reforms, body cameras and other forms of public pressure on police officers. Some scholars believe the pandemic has worsened underlying social and economic instability in the city.

Many residents expressed reluctance to go back on the city's transit system, citing crime rates. In a survey that the MTA conducted in April 2021, 72 percent of 17,000 self-identified frequent riders said they were more concerned with increased crime than with COVID-19 transmission in the subway, and 36 percent of riders who stopped using the system since the pandemic said they were reluctant to return to the system due to their concerns over crime. There had been six murders in the system in 2020, more than in the previous three years combined, and the number of rapes, robberies, and burglaries was also recorded as having increased. In February 2021, the MTA requested an additional 1,500 police after two subway riders were killed, and MTA workers and riders continued to experience harassment and physical attacks, including being spit on.

=== Social disparities ===
In April 2020, during the initial and severe stage of the pandemic, Black and Hispanic communities had a mortality rate of 264 and 269 deaths per 100,000 people, compared to 124 for white people. There were geographic disparities as well: prior to the pandemic, the Upper East Side of Manhattan had 27 times more primary care providers than Elmhurst and Corona, or eight times the city average. The same Queens communities had a COVID-19 infection rate four times that of Manhattan' East Side and a death rate six times higher. Multiple reports showed that minority communities in New York City were severely affected by COVID-19, partially due to higher population density in minority-dominated neighborhoods and a higher rate of comorbidities.

A 2020 study found that COVID-19 testing in New York City was more egalitarian than income distribution. However, the same study found significant disparity in test results across income levels. Comparing the poorest ZIP codes to the wealthiest revealed a 38 to 65 percent difference in negative tests.

Early data showed demographic disparities in vaccine distribution. As of January 31, 2021, 48% of people receiving vaccine doses were reported as white, compared with 11%, 15%, and 15% of Black, Asian, and Latinx individuals respectively, though 40% of vaccine recipients at the time had not had demographic data collected. Vaccine hesitancy has been an issue, especially in low-income neighborhoods. Many Black New Yorkers cited fear and suspicion of the government entities advocating vaccination. Vaccination rates improved significantly with city and state mandates.

New York City's large population of undocumented workers were excluded from federal economic relief. In 2021, lobbied by a coalition of community-based organizations, the New York State Legislature allocated $2.1 billion for distribution to excluded workers. Critics stated that this fund might also contain obstacles or inequities that would further exclude workers. Despite this, aid was rapidly distributed to those who were eligible and applied. Applications to the fund were closed on October 8, 2021. Lawmakers and organizers stated that the fund's rapid depletion could leave tens of thousands of eligible applicants without relief.

=== Deaths ===
As of October 16, 2025, the NYC DoH records the following for NYC Residents:

Total	Number
Cases	3,769,829
Hospitalizations	246,123
Deaths	47,148

Nursing homes have had high fatality rates, accounting for at least 2,056 deaths in the city as of April 20, 2020. New York State Health Commissioner Howard Zucker stated that the policy was for nursing home residents who tested positive to be returned from hospitals back to their nursing homes.

An excess mortality analysis found more than double as many deaths as expected in New York City between March 4 and April 4, 2020. Between March 11, 2020, and May 2, 2020, there were 32,107 deaths in the city; based on past data, this number was higher than expected by 24,172. According to official figures, COVID-19 is linked with 18,879 of the excess deaths (including probable cases that were not confirmed with testing).

A study published in JAMA Network Open found New York City's COVID-19 death rates in the spring of 2020 were comparable to the peak of the Spanish flu, per capita.

== Public health impact ==
=== Hospitals ===
New York City usually has about 20,000 hospital beds and 5,000 ventilators, many of which are routinely in use to keep ICU patients alive. Social distancing measures were implemented to slow the spread of the virus and prevent the hospital system from collapsing. In the early days of the crisis, on March 14, 2020, the Health and Hospitals Corporation and New York-Presbyterian cancelled non-emergency surgeries. Northwell Health put out a call for retired nurses to return. The Tisch Hospital of NYU Langone converted a pediatric emergency ward into a respiratory ward. Personal protective equipment (PPE) was rationed due to shortages. By March 25 the situation at Elmhurst Hospital, one of the worst-affected hospitals in the city, had deteriorated to the point that staff described it as "apocalyptic". Dr. David Reich, President and COO of Mount Sinai Hospital, announced in March that the hospital was converting its lobbies into extra patient rooms to "meet the growing volume of patients" with coronavirus.

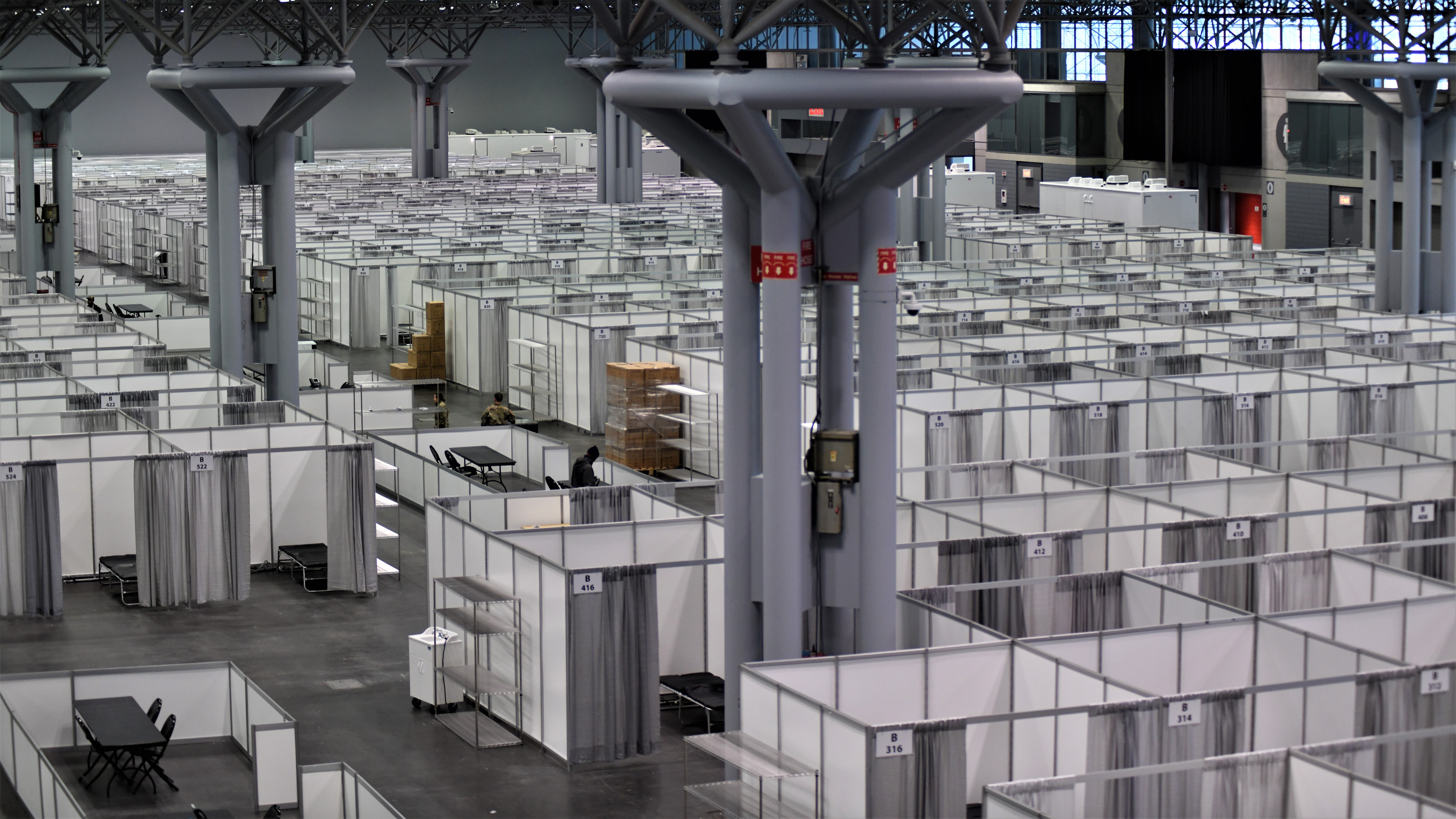
The "Javits New York Medical Station" was a field hospital set up in the Javits Center

In response to the increasing number of COVID-19 cases at the end of March 2020, several temporary field hospitals were built or proposed, including the Javits Center in Manhattan (2,500 beds), USTA Billie Jean King National Tennis Center in Queens (350 beds), and in Central Park in Manhattan (68-bed COVID respiratory care unit). Field hospitals were also proposed at the New York Expo Center in the Bronx, Aqueduct Racetrack in Queens, the Brooklyn Cruise Terminal, and the College of Staten Island. At the request of the Mayor, veterinary clinics sent their ventilators to human hospitals.

The USTA field hospital only treated 79 COVID-19 patients until it closed on May 13, while costing the city at least $52 million. Due to rules constraining transfers and preventing 911 calls from going there, it remained mostly empty as at least three COVID-19 patients quarantining at home died and nearby hospitals exceeded capacity. USTA also had its own ambulances it could not use to pick up transfers due to exclusivity agreements between hospitals and ambulance companies. During the peak of the COVID-19 pandemic, private hospitals had spare beds while some public hospitals were unable to offload enough patients to stay within normal capacity, unlike during Hurricane Sandy, when patients were actively balanced across the region.

Although the number of new patients admitted to the hospitals started to slow in early April, Cuomo stated that social distancing protocols would continue to be enforced to prevent a rise in these figures that could overwhelm the strained healthcare system. The USNS Comfort was originally intended to take non-COVID patients to ease the burden on city hospitals, but most New Yorkers remained isolated in their homes and non-COVID admissions decreased dramatically; the admission processes for patients who did present at the emergency room was cumbersome. On April 21, when Cuomo told Trump that the Comfort was no longer needed, the ship had treated 179 patients. Another field hospital, built in Brooklyn for $21 million during April, was closed the next month without ever seeing any patients.

The senior director of the System-wide Special Pathogens Program at NYC Health + Hospitals Syra Madad, who worked through the first wave in spring, said, "We never want this to happen again", referring to the nearly 20,000 deaths from COVID-19 in New York City.

=== Shortages and policy changes ===
The New York City healthcare system continued to experience major shortages with its COVID-19 testing capacity. On April 11, 2020, the city's Department of Health and Mental Hygiene warned that the city's hospitals were close to running out of cotton swabs used for COVID-19 testing. The same alert reminded healthcare providers that only those patients admitted for hospitalization should be given COVID-19 tests.

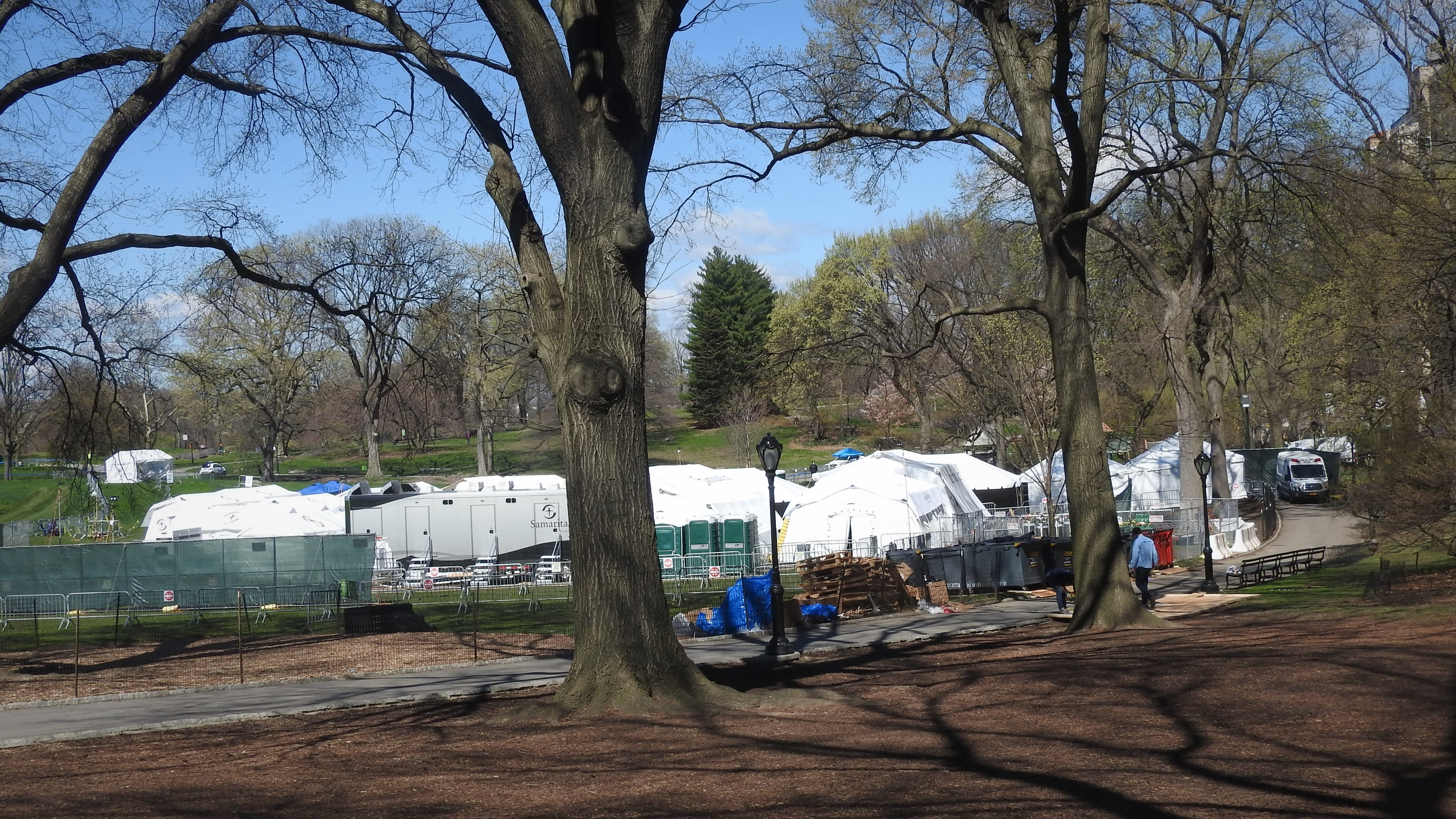
Field hospital in Central Park

Some doctors tried to crowdsource tablet computers so patients can say goodbye to loved ones with video calls. Too often, the last contact patients had with their families was when they were dropped off at the hospital or taken by ambulance.

Due to the demand from the pandemic on New York City hospitals, emergency medical services (EMS) personnel were ordered not to transport adult cardiac arrest cases to the hospital, if the EMS personnel were unable to restart the patient's heart at the scene. On April 21, this order was modified to "do not resuscitate", meaning EMS should no longer try to revive persons on scene.

=== Guidelines ===
On April 5, 2020, a state Health Department official confirmed that seriously ill COVID-19 patients were being treated with hydroxychloroquine. The effects were being observed by the University of Albany's School of Public Health. On April 23, Cuomo said that based on one study the drug "didn't really have much on an effect on the recovery rate." Although some studies are still ongoing, hospitals have stopped using the drug as treatment.

On May 1, 2020, the New York State Department of Health issued fresh COVID-19 guidelines for the Medicaid providers serving low-income families, adult care facilities (including nursing homes), and physically disabled individuals. These guidelines were directed towards the providers of social daycare (SDC) services which also included the elderly (PACE) organizations and providers of Consumer Directed Personal Assistance Program (CDPAP).

In June 2024, significant changes were announced for the Consumer Directed Personal Assistance Program (CDPAP). These changes affect both the application process and the eligibility criteria for service recipients. Specifically, new selection criteria now consider not only the health condition of the patient but also their financial status. Families with incomes above a certain level may no longer be eligible for full coverage of services provided by CDPAP. Additionally, the program has expanded the options for consumers to select and hire their own caregivers, which aims to increase flexibility and improve the quality of services. These changes will take effect on August 1, 2024, and are intended to enhance the quality of life for patients requiring continuous support and home care.

However, just a month earlier, New York State signed a 2021 fiscal budget to cap Medicaid long-term care (LTC) enrollment at 3% under the managed long-term care (MLTC) plans. In the long run, the 3% capping will gradually reduce the number of individuals served by current Medicaid LTC plans, and also reduce the number of provider organizations able to contract with MLTC plans. However, the LTC recipients are a substantial population at risk for COVID-19 and there are costs involved to make sure the LTC facilities are adequately staffed and that infection control protocols are closely followed.

=== Variants ===
By March 2021, the B.1.526 variant (believed to have developed locally in NYC) accounted for over 45% of new cases in the city. The variant first appeared in samples collected in the city in November 2020 and accounted for a "worrying" rise of cases in January 2021.

The first case of P.1 variant (Brazil) was identified on March 20, 2021, as the UK variant was also spreading. While the UK variant was becoming dominant in the rest of the United States, in NYC the New York variant was spreading even faster.

In total, the three variants accounted for 65% of new cases in mid-March 2021. By July, the more-severe Delta variant became the dominant strain.

At end of the week of December 25, 2021, the Department of Health reported that the Omicron variant accounted for nearly all positive cases after becoming the dominant strain five weeks after it was detected.

== Demographics ==
On April 5, 2020, it was reported that 51% of lab-confirmed COVID-19 cases in NYC involved people at least 50 years old. In previous weeks, the dominant cohort of cases had been men between 18 and 49 years of age.

In April 2020, The New York Times reported that the virus was twice as deadly for Black and Latino people than whites in New York City. Officials attribute this difference to longstanding inequalities of health care access, economic status, prevalence of chronic health issues or other co-morbidities, and the fact that Black and Latino people might be over represented among essential workers. 75% of front line workers are minorities. By early May, over 5,200 Latinos in the city had died of COVID-19, making them the ethnic group with the highest number of deaths from the disease.

COVID-19 is also considered to disproportionately affect low-income immigrants, who may have higher risk of exposure, misinformation, and be hesitant to access care.

== Graphs ==
Adapted from nyc.gov. The cases are by date of diagnosis, and deaths are by date of death. Due to delays in reporting, historical counts may be subject to change and recent data may be incomplete.

=== COVID-19 cases over time ===
View chart definition.

=== COVID-19 deaths over time ===
View chart definition.

=== All-cause deaths over time ===
Weekly all-cause deaths in New York City:

View source data.

== See also ==
- List of disasters in New York City by death toll
- Healthcare in New York City
- History of public health in New York City
- COVID-19 pandemic in the United States
