= List of beaches in New York =

Below is a partial list of beaches of the U.S. state of New York.

== New York City ==
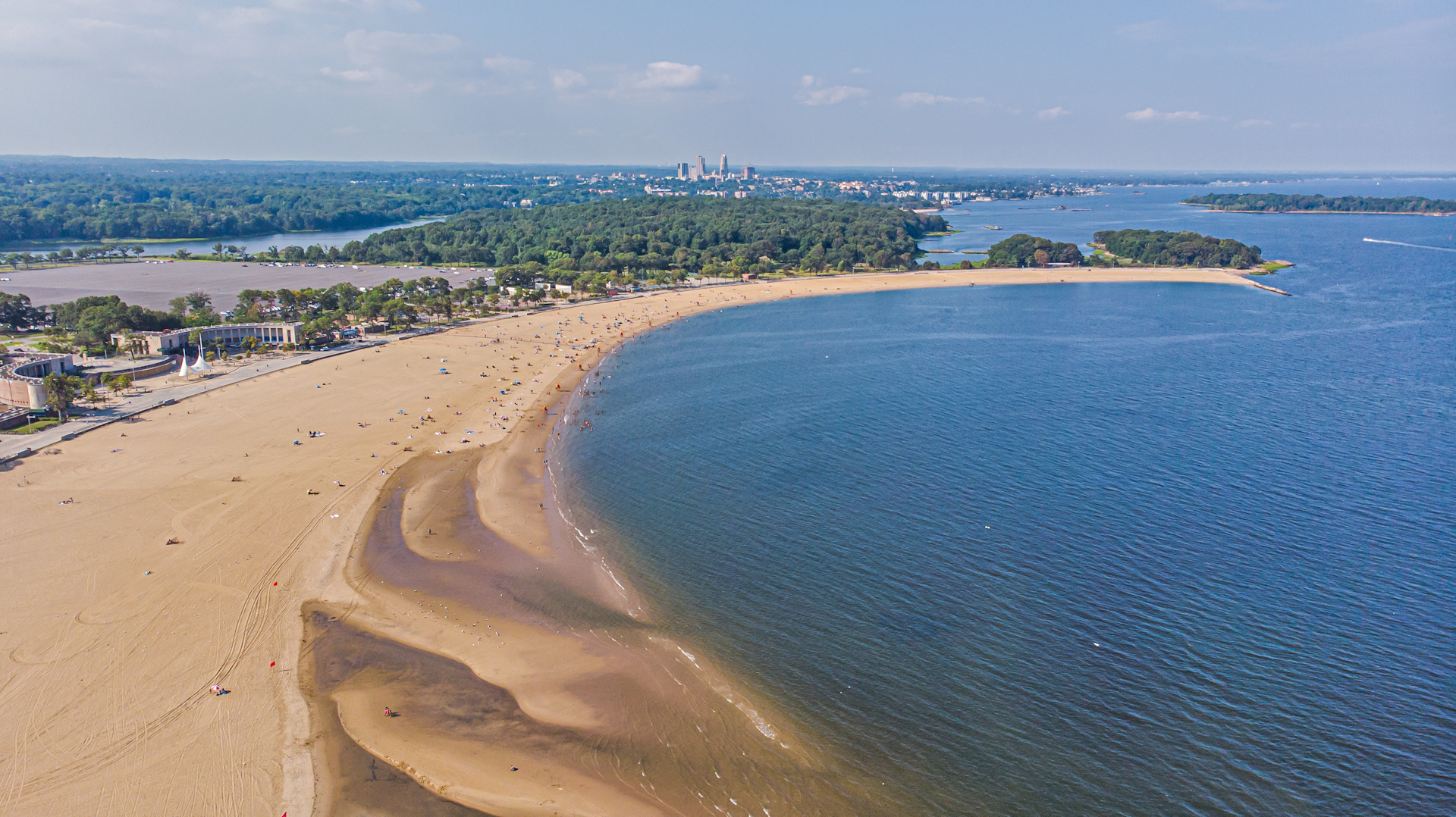
Orchard Beach in The Bronx

- Coney Island Beach and Boardwalk, Brooklyn
  - Brighton Beach
  - Coney Island
- Fort Tilden, Queens - The pristine beaches in this National Park Service-managed site never get crowds because they are not accessible by public transit and even by car, require a small hike to get to, except for visitors with a fishing license. There are no lifeguards at the park and the tides are strong so swimming is not advised. Besides sunbathing, the primary recreational activities are fishing, bird-watching and beach walks. Visitors can also take a nature walk on trails through a successional maritime forest behind the beach. An observation deck at one of two old military batteries at the park offers sweeping views of New York Harbor.
- Gerritsen Beach, Brooklyn
- Great Kills Park, Staten Island
- Jacob Riis Park, Queens - Jacob Riis Park features an ocean beach with lifeguards in season, a boardwalk, an historic Art Deco bathhouse and recreational facilities that include paddle tennis, baseball, basketball and volleyball courts. It can be reached by public transit and also has parking. The park is part of Gateway National Recreation Area and is managed by the National Park Service. Concessionaires operate beach clubs that offer food, cabanas and other services and facilities for a fee. Beach wheelchairs are available and the boardwalk is wheelchair-accessible.
- Manhattan Beach, Brooklyn
- Orchard Beach, Bronx
- Plumb Beach, Brooklyn
- Rockaway Beach, Queens
- South Beach and Boardwalk, Staten Island
  - Midland Beach, Staten Island
  - New Dorp Beach
  - South Beach, Staten Island
- Water Taxi Beach, Queens

== Remainder of Long Island ==
- Atlantic Beach
- East Hampton
- Fire Island
- Long Beach
- Lido Beach
- Montauk
- Ocean Beach
- Point Lookout
- South Hampton
- Westhampton Beach
- West Hampton Dunes

== Upstate New York ==
- Southwick Beach State Park - Lake Ontario
- Ontario Beach Park, Rochester - Lake Ontario
- Sylvan Beach - Oneida Lake

== See also ==
- List of beaches
- List of beaches in New England
- List of beaches in the United States
