= Bespoke Gene Therapy Consortium =

The Bespoke Gene Therapy Consortium (BGTC) is a research initiative of the US Foundation for the National Institutes of Health. The consortium consists of the FDA, NIH, five non-profit organizations, and 10 pharmaceutical companies.
