= William Blattner =

American virologist

William A. Blattner is an American virologist and physician known for his pioneering studies on the epidemiology of human retroviruses. He is a professor of medicine at the University of Maryland School of Medicine, where he co-founded the Institute of Human Virology (IHV) with Robert Gallo and Robert R. Redfield in 1996. He subsequently helped found the Institute of Human Virology, Nigeria, which has screened over 1 million Nigerians for HIV/AIDS. He retired from his position as associate director of the IHV and director of its Division of Epidemiology and Prevention on January 31, 2016. He is also the founding editor-in-chief of the Journal of Acquired Immune Deficiency Syndromes, and serves as its co-editor-in-chief along with Paul A. Volberding.

== Education and career ==
Blattner received his bachelor's degree in 1966 from Washington University in St. Louis and his medical degree in 1970 from Washington University School of Medicine. He then worked for the National Cancer Institute for 22 years before joining the faculty of the University of Maryland School of Medicine in 1995.

== Work ==
Along with his then-colleague Gallo at the National Cancer Institute, Blattner defined the link between HTLV-1 and adult T-cell leukemia/lymphoma, and played an important role working alongside Gallo on his pioneering research on HIV and AIDS.

== Honors and awards ==
Blattner has received the Alumni Achievement Award from Washington University. He has also received the John Snow Award from the U.S. Public Health Service and the American Public Health Association.
