= Robert R. Redfield =

American medical researcher and CDC director

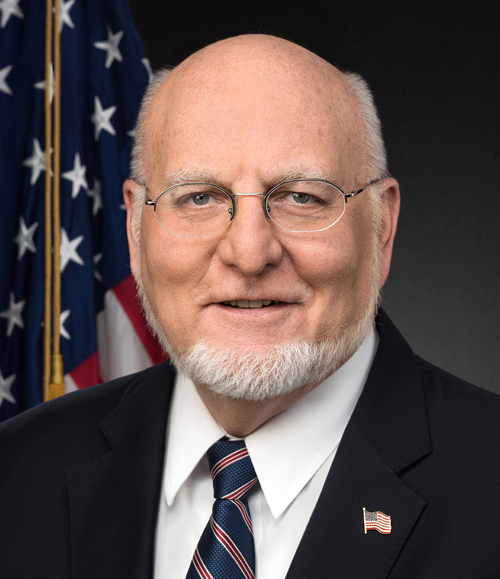
- Redfield in 2018

18th Director of the Centers for Disease Control and Prevention
- In office March 26, 2018 – January 20, 2021
- President: Donald Trump
- Deputy: Anne Schuchat
- Preceded by: Brenda Fitzgerald
- Succeeded by: Rochelle Walensky

Personal details
- Born: Robert Ray Redfield Jr. July 10, 1951 (age 75) Bethesda, Maryland, U.S.
- Education: Georgetown University (BS, MD)

Military service
- Allegiance: United States
- Branch/service: United States Army
- Years of service: 1977–1996
- Rank: Colonel
- Unit: Medical Corps

Robert Ray Redfield Jr. (born July 10, 1951) is an American virologist who served as the 18th Director of the U.S. Centers for Disease Control and Prevention and the Administrator of the Agency for Toxic Substances and Disease Registry from 2018 to 2021.

== Early life and education ==
Robert Ray Redfield Jr. was born on July 10, 1951. His parents, Robert Ray Redfield (1923–1956, from Ogden) and Betty, née Gasvoda, were both scientists at the National Institutes of Health, where his father was a surgeon and cellular physiologist at the National Heart Institute; Redfield's career in medical research was influenced by this background. His parents had another son and a daughter. His father died when he was four years old.

Redfield attended Georgetown University, and at college worked in Columbia University laboratories where investigations focused on the involvement of retroviruses in human disease. Redfield earned a Bachelor of Science from Georgetown University's College of Arts and Sciences in 1973. He then attended Georgetown University School of Medicine and was awarded his Doctor of Medicine in 1977.

== Army career ==
Redfield's medical residency was at Walter Reed Army Medical Center (WRAMC) in Washington, D.C., where he completed his postgraduate medical training and internships in internal medicine (1978–1980), as a U.S. Army officer. Redfield completed clinical and research fellowships at WRAMC, in infectious diseases and tropical medicine, by 1982.

Redfield continued as a U.S. Army physician and medical researcher at the WRAMC for the next decade, working in virology, immunology and clinical research. He collaborated with teams at the forefront of AIDS research, publishing several papers and advocating for strategies to translate knowledge gained from clinical studies to the practical treatment of patients afflicted by chronic viral diseases. During this time, Redfield received the Surgeon General's Physician Recognition Award in 1987, an honorary degree from the New York Medical College in 1989, a lifetime services award from the Institute for Advanced Studies in Immunology and Aging in 1993.

During this time, Redfield served on the board of Americans for a Sound AIDS Policy (ASAP), which gay groups criticized for anti-gay, conservative Christian policies, such as abstinence-only prevention. Redfield also authored the foreword to the 1990 book co-written by ASAP leader W. Shepard Smith, "Christians in the Age of AIDS", which discouraged the distribution of sterile needles to drug users as well as condom use, calling them "false prophets". The book described AIDS as "God's judgment" against homosexuals.

Redfield retired from the Army in 1996 as a colonel.

=== HIV vaccine controversy ===
In 1992, the Defense Department investigated Redfield after he was accused of misrepresenting the effects of an experimental HIV vaccine, the study of which he had overseen. On the basis of this data, in 1992, the U.S. Senate gave a $20 million appropriation for a private company, MicroGeneSys, to develop a therapeutic HIV vaccine based on the protein gp160, which went into clinical trials. Randy Shilts, author of And The Band Played On, wrote that the idea of a therapeutic vaccine was a radical idea that came to Redfield while reading his children a book about Louis Pasteur which he then discussed with Jonas Salk who was in support. At the time a U.S. Army Lieutenant Colonel, Redfield was the Army's leading AIDS researcher, and a proponent of the vaccine.

In July 1992, Redfield gave an abstract presentation on the vaccine at the international AIDS conference in Amsterdam. Based on preliminary results of 15 of the 26 patients who got the vaccine, Redfield said that the viral load of patients getting the vaccine was lower than patients who did not get the vaccine. Most researchers believe that viral load is a good indicator of vaccine effectiveness. The vaccine later turned out to be ineffective. Many researchers, however, were skeptical of the data, and were unable to reproduce Redfield's analysis. Craig Hendrix, a US Air Force scientist (now at Johns Hopkins) said that Redfield committed scientific misconduct by misusing data in studies of the vaccine.

In 1993, a U.S. Army investigation acknowledged accuracy issues with the HIV vaccine clinical trials, but concluded that their investigations "did not support the allegations of scientific misconduct," and he was subsequently promoted to colonel. Redfield is quoted in Big Shot: Passion, Politics, and the Struggle for an AIDS Vaccine, the comprehensive book on the controversy, as saying of his accusers, "I am disappointed in the institutions for not holding the individuals accountable for what I consider conduct unbecoming of an officer."

Redfield continued studies of the gp160 vaccine; the results of the 27-author phase II clinical trial were published in the Journal of Infectious Disease in 2000, concluding that the vaccine was ineffective, with Deborah L. Birx as lead author. Redfield's multi-site study was a collaboration between the Department of Defense and the National Institutes of Health, The work did not, however, result in an effective vaccine.

The 1993 investigation said that Redfield had an "inappropriate" close relationship with the non-governmental group "Americans for a Sound AIDS/HIV Policy" (ASAP), which promoted the gp160 vaccine. The group was founded by evangelical Christians who worked to contain the HIV/AIDS outbreak by advocating for abstinence before marriage, rather than passing out condoms — a view Redfield says he's since changed.

== University of Maryland School of Medicine ==
In 1996, Redfield, his HIV research colleague Robert Gallo and viral epidemiologist William Blattner co-founded the Institute of Human Virology at the University of Maryland School of Medicine. It is a multidisciplinary research organization dedicated to developing research and treatment programs for chronic human viral infection and disease.

At the University of Maryland School of Medicine, Redfield served as a tenured professor of medicine and microbiology, chief of infectious disease, and vice chair of medicine. Redfield is known for his contributions in this period — in clinical research, in particular, for research into the virology and therapeutic treatments of HIV infection and AIDS. In the early years of investigations into the AIDS pandemic in the 1980s, Redfield led research that demonstrated that the HIV retrovirus could be heterosexually transmitted. He also developed the staging system now in use worldwide for the clinical assessment of HIV infection. Under his clinical leadership at the University of Maryland the patient base grew from 200 patients to approximately 6,000 in Baltimore and Washington, D.C., and more than 1.3 million in African and Caribbean nations. His clinical research team won over $600 million in research funding.

In the 2000s, Redfield was a prominent advocate for the ABCs of AIDS doctrine, which promoted abstinence primarily and condoms only a last resort.

While holding this position, he was interviewed for the 2009 HIV/AIDS denialist film House of Numbers. Scientists interviewed for the film complained afterward that their comments had been taken out of context and misrepresented, and that, unknown at the interview times, the film promoted pseudoscience.

Redfield served as a member of the President's Advisory Council on HIV/AIDS from 2005 to 2009, and was appointed as chair of the International Subcommittee from 2006 to 2009. He is a past member of the Office of AIDS Research Advisory Council at the National Institutes of Health, the Fogarty International Center Advisory Board at the National Institutes of Health, and the Advisory Anti-Infective Agent Committee of the Food and Drug Administration. In 2012, along with William Blattner, he was named entrepreneur of the year at the University of Maryland. In 2016 he was named the inaugural Robert C. Gallo, MD Endowed Professors in Translational Medicine.

== CDC Director ==
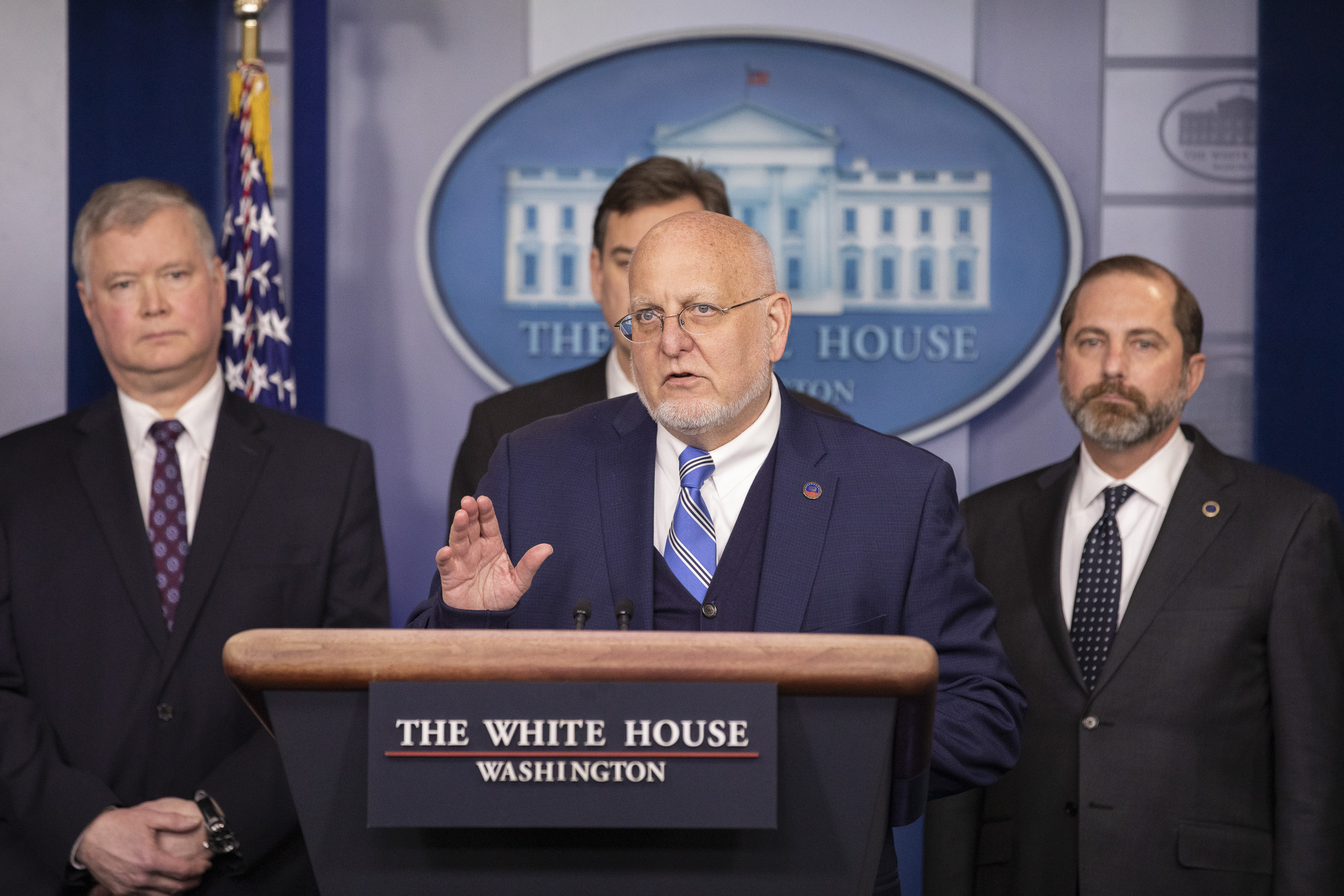
Redfield speaks on the COVID-19 pandemic in January 2020

Redfield became the Director of the U.S. Centers for Disease Control and Prevention on March 26, 2018. He was appointed to the post by President Donald Trump, after the president's first appointee, Brenda Fitzgerald, resigned in scandal.

His appointment was considered controversial; he was publicly opposed by the Center for Science in the Public Interest and Patty Murray, the ranking Democrat on the Senate health committee, but supported by Kathleen Kennedy Townsend and some advocates for AIDS patients. Redfield was criticized for maintaining close ties with homophobic activists, although he has publicly supported the use of condoms and denied ever promoting abstinence-only interventions.

In his inaugural address to the CDC, Redfield called the agency "science-based and data-driven, and that's why CDC has the credibility around the world that it has".

In 2018, after Redfield was appointed to the CDC, Democrats and watchdog groups criticized his $375,000-a-year salary, which was significantly higher than the $219,700 salary of his predecessor, Tom Frieden, and higher than that of Redfield's boss, Alex Azar, the Secretary of Health and Human Services. Azar (a former president of a division of Eli Lilly) and the head of the FDA had taken significant pay cuts on moving into government service, but their salaries are set by Congress while the salary of the CDC Director is not. Within a few days, Redfield asked for and received a pay reduction to $209,700 from $375,000 because "[he] did not want his compensation to become a distraction from the important work of the CDC".

=== COVID-19 pandemic ===
On January 8, 2020, Redfield was advised by the head of China's Center for Disease Control and Prevention that SARS-CoV-2 (the virus that causes COVID-19) was probably contagious among humans. Redfield did not warn the public at that time. The first confirmed case of COVID-19 was discovered in the U.S. on January 20, 2020, while Redfield was serving as director of the CDC. Redfield was a member of the White House Coronavirus Task Force from its start on January 29, 2020.

On February 13, 2020, Redfield said that the "virus is probably with us beyond this season, beyond this year, and I think eventually the virus will find a foothold and we will get community-based transmission". This contrasted with statements by President Trump, who, erroneously, told the public through most of February that the virus was under control.

During February 2020, the CDC's early coronavirus test malfunctioned nationwide. Redfield reassured his fellow task force officials that the problem would be quickly solved, according to White House officials. It took about three weeks to sort out the failed test kits, which may have been contaminated during their processing in a CDC lab. Widespread COVID-19 testing in the United States was effectively stalled until February 28, when the faulty test was revised, and the days afterward, when the Food and Drug Administration began loosening rules that had restricted other labs from developing tests. Later investigations by the Food and Drug Administration and the Department of Health and Human Services found that the CDC had violated its own protocols in developing the faulty test.

Redfield testified to Congress on March 2, 2020, about the outbreak of COVID-19 in the U.S. Given the lack of testing on patients and healthcare workers requesting testing, Florida Democrat Debbie Wasserman Schultz asked Redfield about who was responsible to ensure testing could be performed on individuals who needed to be tested. Redfield could not name a specific individual and looked to Anthony Fauci, director of infectious disease at the NIH, who said, "The system is not geared to what we need right now... that is a failing."

On April 6, 2020, to justify his belief that social distancing could be effective and that COVID-19 deaths would not be as high as models predicted, Redfield stated on AM 1030 KVOI Radio in Tucson, Arizona, "those models that were done, they assume only about 50 percent of the American public would pay attention to the recommendations".

On July 14, 2020, Redfield warned that the winter of 2020–2021 would probably be "one of the most difficult times that we've experienced in American public health". He also said, "If we could get everybody to wear a mask right now, I really do think over the next four, six, eight weeks, we could bring this epidemic under control." Trump, asked about Redfield's statements, said he opposed a mask law and said "masks cause problems too," but also said, "I think masks are good".

On July 23, the CDC called for reopening American schools, in a statement written by a working group at the White House that included Redfield but had minimal representation from other CDC officials.

Trump publicly contradicted Redfield on September 16, 2020, on the timeline for a COVID-19 vaccine and the effectiveness of masks compared with inoculation. Redfield told a Senate panel that a limited supply of a COVID-19 vaccine might be available in November or December, but that the general public would not be inoculated until the summer or fall of 2021. Redfield also said that masks could be a more effective protection against COVID-19 than the vaccine. After Redfield's testimony, Trump told reporters, "I believe he was confused" and said a vaccine could be available in weeks and go "immediately" to the general public.

In September 2020, Redfield sought to extend a no-sail order on passenger cruise ships into 2021 to prevent the spread of COVID-19, but he was overruled by Vice President Mike Pence. The no-sail order was instead set to expire on October 31, 2020. Some of the severest early outbreaks of COVID-19 were on cruise ships.

==== Assessments ====
The CDC's actions during the pandemic have led to intense scrutiny of Redfield in congressional hearings and in media reports. Laurie Garrett, a science journalist who is a former senior fellow for global health at the Council on Foreign Relations, called Redfield "about the worst person you could think of to be heading the CDC at this time" and said "he lets his prejudices interfere with the science, which you cannot afford during a pandemic". William Schaffner, an infectious-disease specialist at Vanderbilt University, said "Bob Redfield's commitment to public health is completely strong," but said that Redfield has had trouble advocating effectively inside the White House. Trump was said to like Redfield but to distrust the CDC.

== Later life ==
In a March 26, 2021, Redfield said that in his opinion the most likely cause of the COVID-19 pandemic was a laboratory escape of SARS-CoV-2, which "doesn't imply any intentionality", and that as a virologist, he did not believe it made "biological sense" for the virus to be so "efficient in human to human transmission" from the early outbreak. In June 2021, Redfield told Vanity Fair that he received death threats from people who disagreed with his statements about the origin of COVID-19. He stated that he was targeted by fellow scientists and ostracized for offering this alternative hypothesis, and highlighted the rising tensions surrounding the virus's origins.

In the political reappraisal of the pandemic, Redfield was heard on March 8, 2023, during a congressional hearing regarding the origins of COVID-19. Redfield reaffirmed his conclusion that the pandemic was caused by a leak from a laboratory (lab leak hypothesis). This conclusion was based primarily on the biology of the virus itself, including its rapid high contagiousness in human-to-human transmission. He stated that the virus was too capable of spreading between humans to be the result of a natural animal-to-human spillover (zoonotic hypothesis).

Redfield stated that the biology of the virus, including its high infectivity in human-to-human transmission, suggests that it originated in a laboratory through gain-of-function research, in which scientists attempt to increase the transmissibility or pathogenicity. Redfield testified that gain-of-function research on high-risk viruses in Wuhan have been funded by National Institutes of Health, the State Department, USAID and the Department of Defense (DOD). The House of Representatives voted unanimously in favor of a bill mandating the release of information on the origin of the SARS-CoV-2 virus.

== Personal life ==
Redfield is married to Joyce Hoke, whom he met while delivering babies as a medical student when she was a nursing assistant. They have six children and nine grandchildren.

== See also ==
- HIV/AIDS research
- COVID-19 pandemic in the United States

Government offices
| Preceded by Brenda Fitzgerald | 18th Director of the Centers for Disease Control and Prevention; 2018–2021 | Succeeded by Rochelle Walensky |
