= Thomas Farley (physician) =

American public health official

Thomas A. Farley
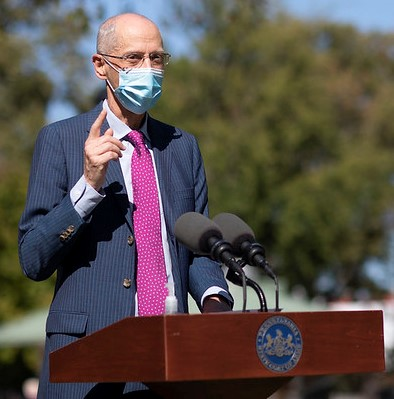

Commissioner of Health of the City of New York
- In office May 18, 2009 – January 16, 2014
- Appointed by: Michael R. Bloomberg
- Preceded by: Thomas R. Frieden
- Succeeded by: Mary Travis Bassett

Commissioner of Philadelphia Department Of Health
- In office February 1, 2016 – May 13, 2021
- Appointed by: Jim Kenney
- Preceded by: Jane Baker
- Succeeded by: Cheryl Bettigole

Thomas A. "Tom" Farley is an American pediatrician who served as Commissioner of Health of the City of New York and Commissioner of the Philadelphia Department of Health.

== Early life and education ==
The sixth of eight children of a patent lawyer father and full-time parent mother, Farley grew up in Westfield, New Jersey. He graduated Phi Beta Kappa from Haverford College in 1977, and later received his MD and MPH degrees from Tulane University.

== Career ==
From 1989 to 2000, he worked for the Centers for Disease Control's Epidemic Intelligence Service and the Louisiana Office of Public Health. During the decade prior to 2009, he was the chair of Tulane's department of community health sciences. From May 2009 until January 2014, Farley was the commissioner of the New York City Department of Health and Mental Hygiene. While he held this position, he promoted multiple public health policies in New York City, including banning smoking in the city's parks and beaches, raising the tobacco purchasing age to 21, and oversaw the coordination of the National Salt Reduction Initiative. He also led the effort to enact the Sugary Drinks Portion Cap Rule. During part of 2014, he served as the Joan H. Tisch Distinguished Fellow in Public Policy at Hunter College. He served as the CEO of the nonprofit organization Public Good Projects.

Farley has written two books. Saving Gotham: A Billionaire Mayor, Activist Doctors, and the Fight for Eight Million Lives published in 2005 shows the effects of public health policy within the city of New York. His Prescription for a Healthy Nation: A New Approach to Improving Our Lives by Fixing Our Everyday World was also published in 2005 and advocates making small changes in the social environment, such as making healthy foods more accessible than junk or snack foods, will result in better health for the community.

On February 1, 2016, Philadelphia mayor Jim Kenney appointed Farley commissioner of the Philadelphia Department of Health.

In 2020, as Philadelphia Health Commissioner, Farley approved the city's partnership with the organization Philly Fighting COVID despite the organization's leadership by a 22-year old university student without experience in public health or business management. Farley continued to defend the organization despite warning signs including PFC not granting the city access to data PFC had accumulated; Philly Fighting COVID losing demographic data; and PFC ceasing their testing operations, abandoning community groups who relied on them for free tests. PFC's CEO Andrei Doroshin would be described by the city as "unprofessional". Philly Fighting COVID was able to test only 20,000 people and vaccinate only 6,800 people. Farley discontinued the relationship following publication of PFC's change to for profit status. Calls for disgraced Philly Fighting COVID CEO Doroshin to resign were made by a number of city council members and state senators.

On May 13, 2021, Mayor Kenney requested Farley's resignation as health commissioner after the public learned that Farley had ordered the destruction in 2017 of the human bodies of victims of the city's 1985 MOVE bombing rather than returning the human remains to the families and without notifying the family of his actions.

In 2021, Farley assumed the position in Washington D.C. as the Senior Deputy Director of the Community Health Administration.

Government offices
Preceded by Tom Frieden	Commissioner of Health of the City of New York; 2009–2014	Succeeded by Mary Bassett
