= Brenda Fitzgerald =

American obstetrician-gynecologist

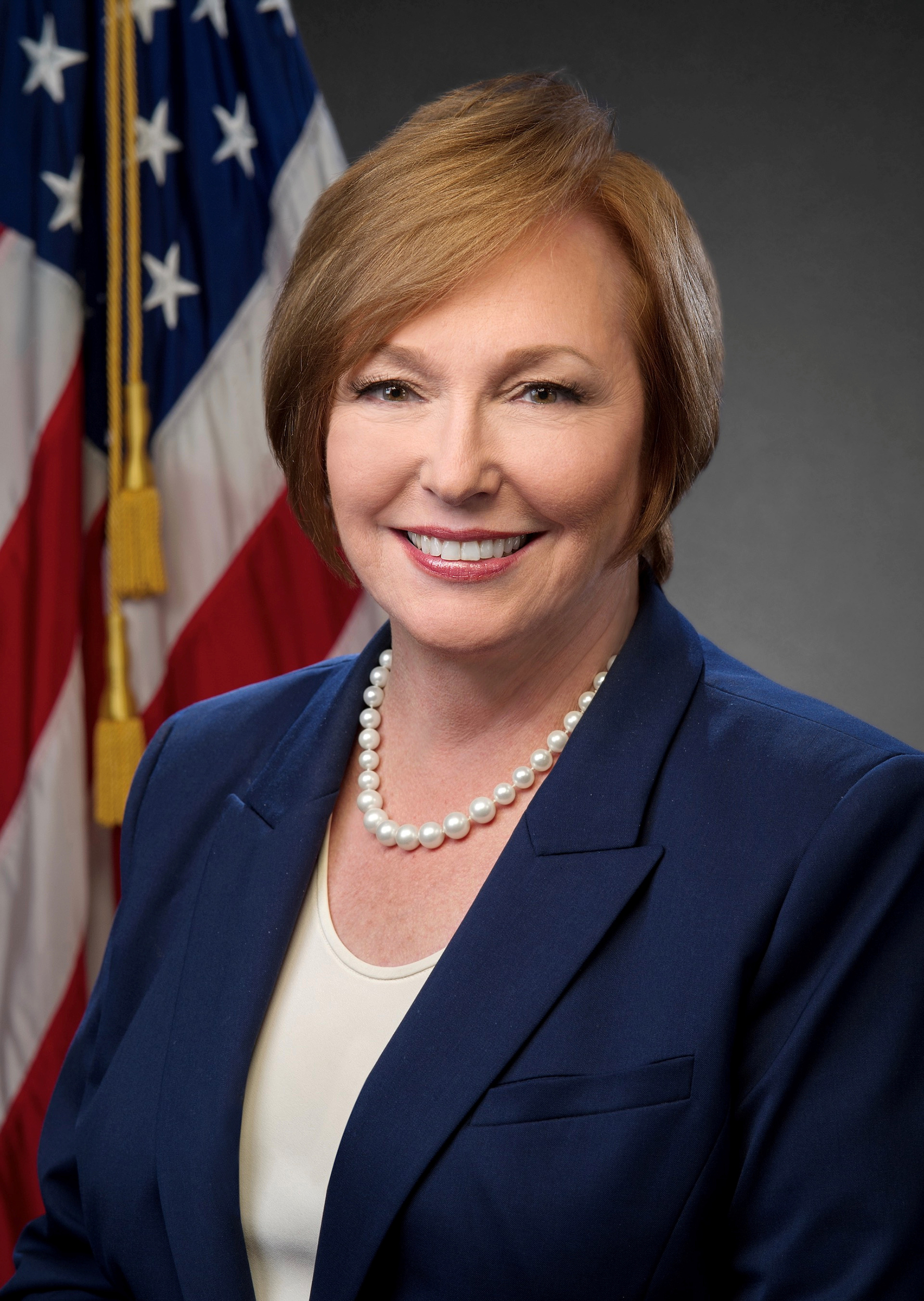
- Fitzgerald in 2017

17th Director of the Centers for Disease Control and Prevention
- In office July 7, 2017 – January 31, 2018
- President: Donald Trump
- Deputy: Anne Schuchat
- Preceded by: Tom Frieden
- Succeeded by: Robert R. Redfield

Commissioner of the Georgia Department of Public Health
- In office June 29, 2011 – July 7, 2017
- Governor: Nathan Deal
- Preceded by: Position established
- Succeeded by: J. Patrick O'Neal

Personal details
- Education: Georgia State University (BS); Emory University (MD)

Military service
- Allegiance: United States
- Branch/service: United States Air Force
- Rank: Major
- Unit: U.S. Air Force Medical Corps

Brenda Fitzgerald is an American obstetrician-gynecologist who served as the 17th Director of the U.S. Centers for Disease Control and Prevention (CDC) in the Donald Trump administration from July 2017 to January 2018. Her tenure was one of the shortest in the office's history, excluding interim appointments. Previously, she was the Commissioner of the Georgia Department of Public Health from 2011 to 2017.

== Early life and career ==
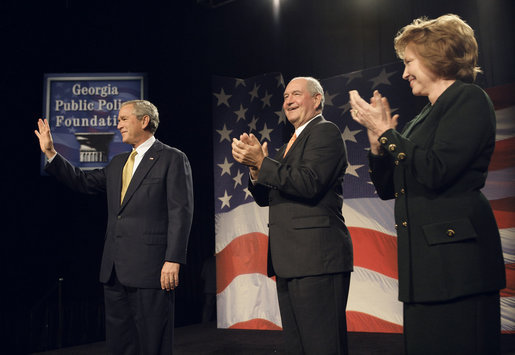
Fitzgerald with President George W. Bush and Sonny Perdue in September 2006

In 1972, Fitzgerald received her Bachelor of Science degree in microbiology from Georgia State University. She went on to medical school at Emory University, where she graduated in 1977, completed post-graduate training and became an assistant clinical professor. She then joined the United States Air Force, where she served first at Wurtsmith Air Force Base and later at Andrews Air Force Base outside Washington, D.C. She attained the rank of Major in the Air Force.

After leaving the Air force, Fizgerald entered private practice specializing in gynecology and obstetrics. While in private practice, Fitzgerald promoted "anti-aging medicines" to her patients, medicines which have been criticized as being unsupported by scientific evidence and potentially dangerous. She has received board certification from the American Academy of Anti-Aging Medicine, though that organization has not been recognized by the American Board of Medical Specialties or the American Medical Association.

In 2011, Georgia Governor Nathan Deal appointed Fitzgerald as Director of the state's Division of Public Health (later Commissioner of the Department of Public Health), which office oversees the state's eighteen health districts and the health departments of the 159 counties. During her tenure as Georgia's commissioner of public health, the state improved on some measures, such as immunization coverage for teenagers; but in a combined-outcomes assessment, calculated annually for each state, Georgia's ranking dropped from 37th place in 2011 to 41st 2016. In 2013, Fitzgerald started a $1.2 million statewide school exercise program, "Power Up for 30", with a $1 million donation by The Coca-Cola Company. The Atlanta soft-drink company's donation was part of a broader $3.8 million pledge to the state in Coke's campaign to combat the obesity epidemic with changes to exercise rather than diet.

Professionally, Fitzgerald has served as president of the Georgia OB-GYN Society. She has served as a board member of the Association of State and Territorial Health Officials, Georgia Public Policy Foundation, Paul Coverdell Leadership Institute, Georgia State School Board, Voices for Georgia's Children, the Advanced Academy of Georgia, the University of West Georgia Foundation, and the Carrollton Rotary Club.

== Politics ==
In 1994, Fitzgerald ran for the Republican nomination in the 7th Congressional District in Georgia. She lost to Bob Barr, gaining 43% of the vote. During the campaign she and Newt Gingrich threw symbolic crates of tea into the Chattahoochee River as a bit of political theater.

== Director of the CDC ==
In July 2017, Fitzgerald was appointed by Health and Human Services Secretary Tom Price to succeed Thomas R. Frieden as the Director of the U.S. Centers for Disease Control and Prevention (CDC). Anne Schuchat had been acting as interim director since Dr. Frieden's resignation was effective on January 20, 2017.

Fitzgerald was replaced as Georgia's Commissioner of the Department of Public Health by Dr. J. Patrick O'Neal as an interim commissioner.

The Washington Post described her tenure as CDC Director as "low-profile", noting that she had made very few public statements. And she had on at least three occasions sent her deputies to testify in congressional hearings about the opioid epidemic while the agency heads of other agencies testified themselves.

=== Conflicts of interest ===
By December 2017 and after five months in office, Fitzgerald had yet to divest her financial holdings that posed conflicts of interest in her position at the CDC. Democratic Senator Patty Murray raised questions as to Fitzgerald's ability to lead the CDC's anti-opioid programs given her financial stake in prescription drug monitoring programs.

In January 2018, Politico reported that Fitzgerald had bought shares in the Japan Tobacco company one month after assuming office as Director of the CDC. The investment raised ethical concerns given the CDC's mission to reduce tobacco use, which is the leading cause of preventable disease in the United States. She sold the stocks a few months later. One day after Politico's story broke, Fitzgerald resigned as Director of the CDC on January 31, 2018.

Government offices
Preceded by Tom Frieden	17th Director of the Centers for Disease Control and Prevention; 2017 – 2018	Succeeded by Robert R. Redfield
