= Richard E. Besser =

American doctor and executive (born 1959)

Rich Besser
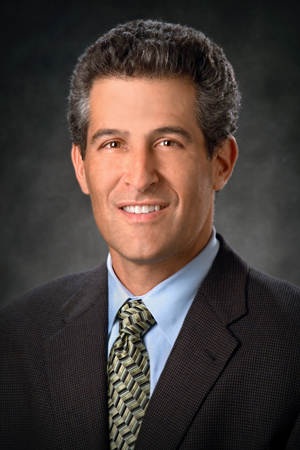
- Besser in January 2009

Acting Director of the Centers for Disease Control and Prevention
- In office January 22, 2009 – June 8, 2009
- President: Barack Obama
- Preceded by: Julie Gerberding
- Succeeded by: Tom Frieden

Personal details
- Born: August 29, 1959 (age 67)
- Relatives: Annie Lennox (sister-in-law)
- Education: Williams College (BA); University of Pennsylvania (MD)

Richard E. Besser (born August 29, 1959) is an American doctor and executive who has served as president and CEO of the Robert Wood Johnson Foundation since April 2017. Besser served as the acting director of the Centers for Disease Control and Prevention (CDC) and the Agency for Toxic Substances and Disease Registry (ATSDR) from January to June 2009. He was ABC News' former chief health and medical editor. Besser is a brother-in-law to Scottish singer Annie Lennox.

In 2026 Time Magazine named Besser as one of the world's 100 most influential philanthropists.

== Early life and education ==
Besser grew up in Princeton, New Jersey, and graduated from Princeton High School in 1977. He is of Jewish descent.

His brother, Mitch, is married to singer-songwriter Annie Lennox.

Besser received his Bachelor of Arts degree in economics from Williams College and his medical degree from the University of Pennsylvania School of Medicine in Philadelphia in 1986. After graduation, Besser completed a residency and a chief residency in pediatrics at Johns Hopkins Hospital in Baltimore.

== Career ==
In 1991, Besser joined the Epidemic Intelligence Service, which is under the supervision of the CDC. He was sent to Boston to investigate a minor outbreak of E. coli there. Officials were unhappy at the length and cost of the investigation, which included collecting deer feces from apple orchards, but Besser eventually found the source of the outbreak, which was apple cider.

Besser also worked as a health reporter for a local television station in San Diego, California, during the 1990s. On January 22, 2009, Besser was named acting director of the CDC and ATSDR. Before the new Obama administration named a permanent director for both agencies, in April 2009, an outbreak of swine flu in North America swept the headlines.

Besser began to hold daily press conferences where he explained the U.S. government's reaction to the outbreak, which originated in Mexico, but had since spread to over 20 countries, with the United States the most affected by the virus's spread. Besser's handling of his press conferences drew praise from prominent American medical professionals such as Dr. Mehmet Oz and David Satcher.

In October 2014, Case Western Reserve University disinvited Besser from a speaking engagement because he had recently returned from a trip to Liberia. His scheduled talk was to be "Pandemics, Public Health, and Political Change: The Critical Importance of Communication", a discussion of the 2009 flu pandemic "when fear was outracing the disease".

Besser wrote at the time: "You cannot catch Ebola in a lecture hall hearing about the power of communication during a public health crisis. I expect universities to fight this kind of fear, not feed it. What we need to do is communicate, as strongly and as often as we can, what the real risks are and aren't."

In Besser's role at ABC News, he provided medical analysis and reports for all ABC News programs and platforms. His weekly health chats on social media reached millions.

In April 2015, Besser delivered the Provost's Lecture at Oregon State University.

In April 2017, Besser replaced Risa Lavizzo-Mourey as president and CEO of the Robert Wood Johnson Foundation in Princeton, New Jersey.
