= Tom Frieden =

American physician

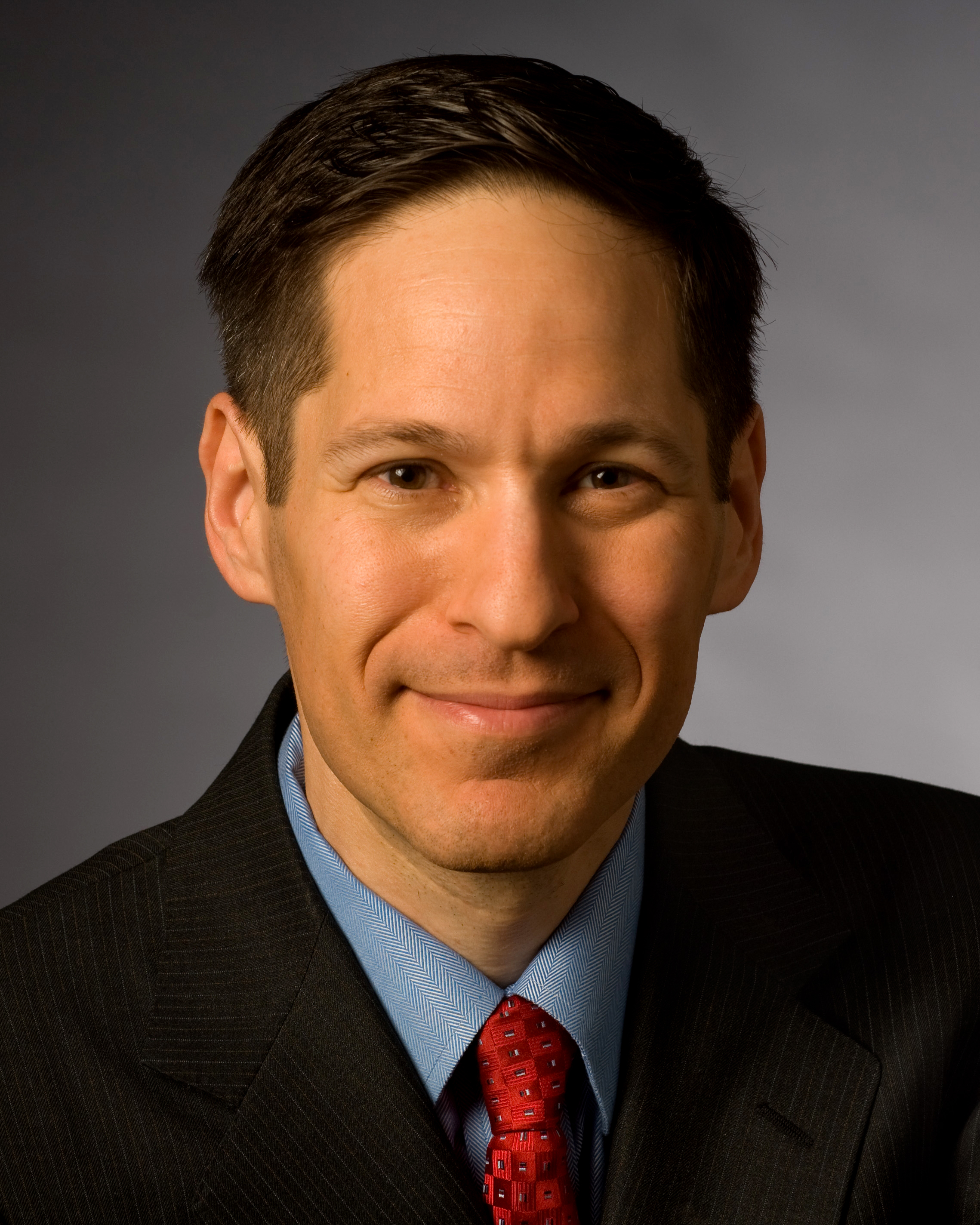

16th Director of the Centers for Disease Control and Prevention
- In office June 8, 2009 – January 20, 2017
- President: Barack Obama
- Preceded by: Julie Gerberding
- Succeeded by: Brenda Fitzgerald

Health Commissioner of New York City
- In office January 2002 – May 18, 2009
- Mayor: Michael Bloomberg
- Preceded by: Neal Cohen
- Succeeded by: Tom Farley

Personal details
- Born: December 7, 1960 (age 65) New York City, New York, U.S.
- Party: Democratic
- Spouse: Barbara Chang
- Relations: Jeffry Frieden (brother)
- Children: 2
- Education: Oberlin College (BA); Columbia University (MPH, MD)

Thomas R. Frieden (born December 7, 1960) is an American infectious disease and public health physician. He serves as president and CEO of Resolve to Save Lives, a global initiative working to prevent epidemics and cardiovascular disease. Launched in 2017 as a five-year initiative, it became an independent non-profit organization in 2022.

He was the director of the U.S. Centers for Disease Control and Prevention (CDC), and he was the administrator of the Agency for Toxic Substances and Disease Registry from 2009 to 2017, appointed by President Barack Obama.

As a commissioner of the New York City Department of Health and Mental Hygiene from 2002 to 2009 he came to some prominence for banning smoking in the city's restaurants as well as the serving of trans fat.

== Education ==
Frieden was born and raised in New York City. His father, Julian Frieden, was chief of coronary care at Montefiore Hospital and New Rochelle Hospitals in New York. Frieden attended Oberlin College graduating with a BA degree in philosophy in 1982. He was a community organizer for the Center for Health Services at Vanderbilt University in 1982, before he started studying medicine at Columbia University College of Physicians and Surgeons and graduated with an MD degree in 1986. At the same time he attended Columbia University Mailman School of Public Health and obtained an MPH degree in 1986. He completed a residency in internal medicine at Columbia-Presbyterian Medical Center 1986–1989 followed by a one-year infectious diseases fellowship from 1989 to 1990 at Yale School of Medicine and Yale–New Haven Hospital.

== Career ==
=== CDC, New York City Department of Health, WHO, 1990–2002 ===
From 1990 to 1992, Frieden worked as an Epidemic Intelligence Service officer assigned by CDC in New York City. From 1992 to 1996, he was assistant commissioner of health and director of the New York City Department of Health and Mental Hygiene, Bureau of Tuberculosis Control, fostering public awareness and helping to improve city, state and federal public funding for TB control. The New York City epidemic was controlled rapidly, reducing overall incidence by nearly half and cutting multidrug-resistant tuberculosis by 80 percent. The city's program became a model for tuberculosis control nationally and globally.

From 1995 to 2001, Frieden worked as a technical advisor for the World Bank, health and population offices. From 1996 to 2002, Frieden worked in India, as a medical officer for the World Health Organization on loan from the CDC. He supported Dr. Khatri and the government of India to implement the Revised National Tuberculosis Control Program. In 2001 he was offered the post of Commissioner of Health of New York City. Before his departure at the end of 2001, the programme had treated around 800,000 million patients. Rapid expansion occurred after his departure and the program's 2008 status report estimated that the nationwide program resulted in 8 million treatments and 1.4 million lives saved. While in India, Frieden and Khatri worked to establish a network of Indian physicians to help India's state and local governments implement the program and helped the Tuberculosis Research Center in Chennai, India, establish a program to monitor the impact of tuberculosis control services.

=== New York City Health Commissioner, 2002 to 2009 ===
Frieden served as Commissioner of Health of the City of New York from 2002 to 2009. At the time of his appointment, the agency employed 6,000 staff and had an annual budget of $1.6 billion. During Frieden's tenure as Commissioner, the Health Department expanded the collection and use of epidemiological data, launching an annual Community Health Survey and the nation's first community-based Health and Nutrition Examination Survey.

New York City's life expectancy at birth increased by 3 years, from 77.9 years in 2001 to 80.9 years in 2010, a faster increase than the national average.

==== Tobacco control, 2002 onward ====
Upon his appointment as Commissioner of Health, Frieden made tobacco control a priority, resulting in a rapid decline after a decade of no change in smoking rates. Frieden established a system to monitor the city's smoking rates, and worked with New York City Mayor Michael R. Bloomberg to increase tobacco taxes, ban smoking in workplaces including restaurants and bars, and run aggressive anti-tobacco ads and help smokers quit. The program reduced smoking prevalence among New York City adults from 21% in 2002 to 17% in 2007 which represented 300,000 fewer smokers. Smoking prevalence among New York City teens declined even more sharply, from 17.6% in 2001 to 8.5% in 2007, which was less than half the national rate. The workplace smoking ban prompted spirited debate before the New York City Council passed it and Mayor Bloomberg signed it into law. Over time, the measure gained broad acceptance by the public and business community in New York City. New York City's 2003 workplace smoking ban followed that of California in 1994. Frieden supported increased cigarette taxes as a means of reducing smoking and preventing teens from starting, saying "tobacco taxes are the most effective way to reduce tobacco use." He supported the 62-cent federal tax on each cigarette pack sold in the United States, introduced in April 2009. One side effect of the increased taxes on tobacco in New York was a large increase in cigarette smuggling into the state from other states with much lower taxes, such as Virginia. The Tax Foundation estimated that "60.9% of cigarettes sold in New York State are smuggled in from other states". In addition, some New Yorkers began to make their own cigarettes, and tobacco trucks were even hijacked. A 2009 Justice Department study found that "The incentive to profit by evading payment of taxes rises with each tax rate hike imposed by federal, state, and local governments".

==== Waiving written consent for HIV testing, 2004 ====
Frieden introduced the city's first comprehensive health policy, Take Care New York, which targeted ten leading causes of preventable illness and death for public and personal action. By 2007, New York City had made measurable progress in eight of the ten priority areas.

As Health Commissioner, Frieden sought to fight HIV and AIDS with public health principles used successfully to control other communicable diseases. A very controversial aspect was the proposal to eliminate separate written consent for HIV testing. He believed the measure would encourage physicians to offer HIV tests during routine medical care, as the CDC recommended. Some community and civil liberties advocates fought this legislation, arguing it would undermine patients' rights and lead eventually to forced HIV testing. In 2010, New York State passed a new law that eased the requirement for separate written consent in some circumstances. Frieden's perspective is now widely accepted, and on February 14, 2007, the New York City Department of Health and Mental Hygiene introduced the NYC Condom, prompting Catholic League president Bill Donohue to respond, "What's next? The city's own brand of clean syringes?" More than 36 million condoms were given away by the program in 2007.

==== Diabetes test result reporting, 2006 ====
Frieden worked to raise awareness about diabetes in New York City, particularly among pregnant women, and established an involuntary, non-disclosed hemoglobin A1C diabetes registry which tracks patients' blood sugar control over several months and reports the information to treating physicians to help them provide better care.

The New York City Board of Health's decision to require laboratories to report A1C test results generated a heated debate among civil libertarians, who viewed it as a violation of medical privacy and an intrusion into the doctor-patient relationship. Although patients may elect not to receive information from the program, there is no provision enabling patients to opt out of having their glycemic control data entered in the database.

==== Transfat plan, 2006 ====
In September 2006, the city proposed to restrict trans fat served in New York restaurants. New York City's trans fat ban followed mandatory labeling of trans fat by the Food and Drug Administration (FDA), was credited with saving lives and preceded by more than a decade the FDA's action to ban trans fat from food throughout the United States.

=== CDC Director, Agency for Toxic Substances and Disease Registry Administrator, 2009–2017 ===
In May 2009, the White House and the Department of Health and Human Services named Frieden director of the Centers for Disease Control and Prevention and administrator of the Agency for Toxic Substances and Disease Registry; positions he assumed in June 2009, from the acting head Richard E. Besser. Frieden resigned effective January 20, 2017.

On announcing Frieden's appointment, President Obama called him "an expert in preparedness and response to health emergencies" who in seven years as New York City's health commissioner was "at the forefront of the fight against heart disease, cancer and obesity, infectious diseases such as tuberculosis and AIDS, and in the establishment of electronic health records."

==== Ebola epidemic, 2014 ====
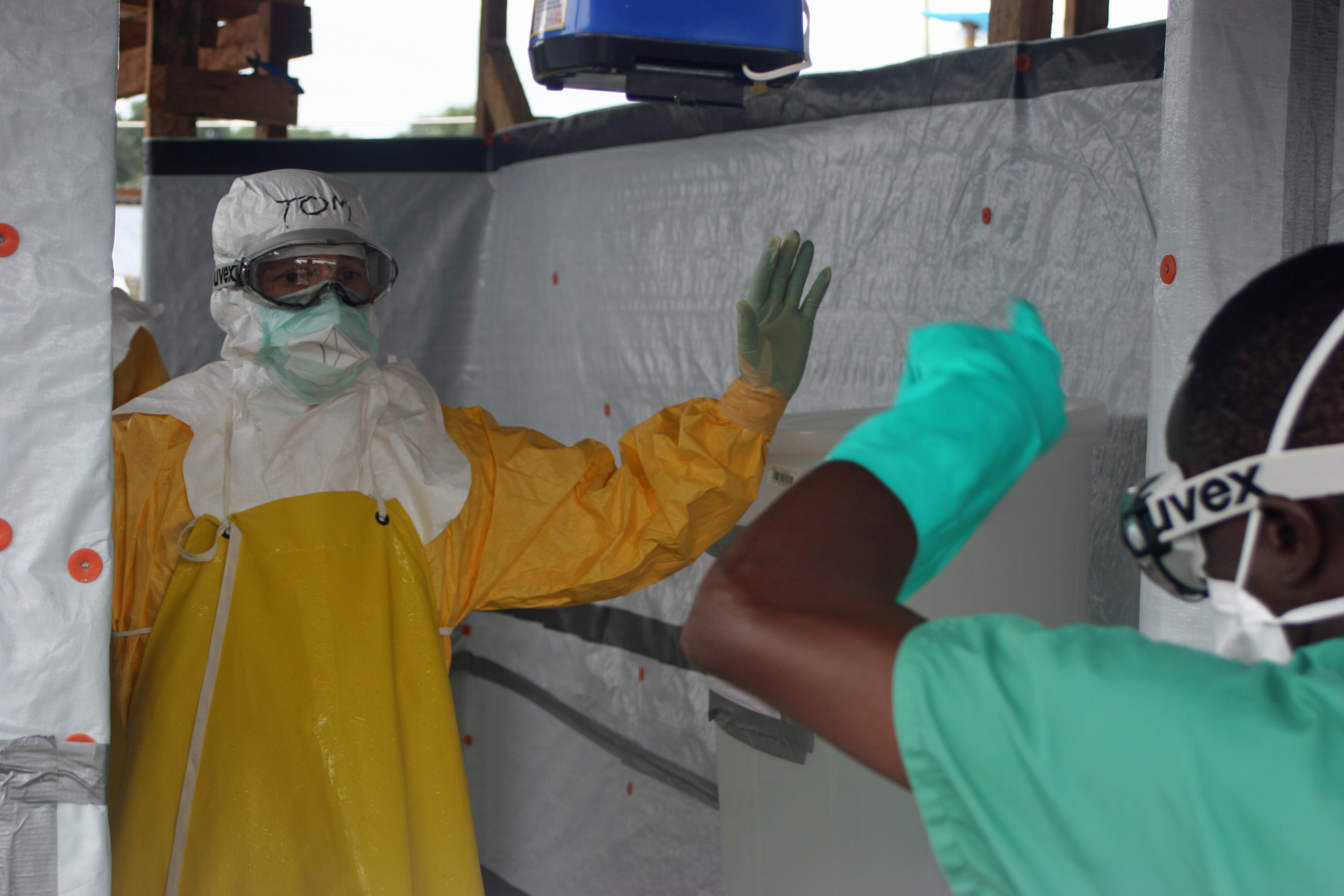
Frieden is decontaminated after visiting Ebola treatment unit in Liberia, August 2014

Frieden was prominently involved in the US and global response to the West African outbreak of Ebola. His visits to West Africa beginning in August 2014 and a September 2014 CDC analysis projecting that the Ebola epidemic could increase exponentially to infect more than 1 million people within four months prompted him to press for an international surge response. At the peak of the response, CDC maintained approximately 200 staff per day in West Africa and about 400 staff per day at its Atlanta headquarters; overall, about 1,900 CDC staff deployed to international and U.S. locations for about 110,000 total work days, and more than 4,000 CDC staff worked as part of the response. After the first U.S. healthcare worker became infected with Ebola, CDC Director Thomas Frieden initially attributed it to a “breach in protocol,” but later acknowledged that investigators had “not identified any personal protective equipment (PPE) or infection control problems” responsible for the transmission, and early messaging suggested that U.S. hospitals were adequately prepared for Ebola cases, a premise later criticized as overly optimistic. The CDC was criticized for not immediately deploying an Ebola response team to Dallas, instead waiting until two days after Thomas Duncan’s admission and after laboratory confirmation of Ebola—this forced the inexperienced local team led by the mayor with no medical training to start the outbreak investigation The Dallas case also revealed deficiencies in hospital preparedness and response capabilities. Ebola was not initially considered during the patient’s first emergency department visit, despite a fever and travel history from Liberia. Critics further described the CDC’s infection-control guidelines as overly complex and difficult to implement in real-world hospital settings. Exacerbating the situation, the Ebola crisis came on the heels of public criticism over CDC laboratory protocol lapses, including exposure incidents involving anthrax and smallpox among CDC scientists. In a Congressional hearing in October 2014, Frieden was asked about his handling of the Ebola crisis after the disease had spread to two nurses from a patient in the US. The day prior, Rep. Tom Marino (R-PA) had called for Frieden's resignation, though others rallied to his defense.

During Frieden’s tenure as CDC director, he identified “winnable battles”: tobacco use, teen pregnancy, HIV, healthcare-associated infections, nutrition and physical activity, and motor vehicle fatalities. Tobacco use decreased from 21% to 15%, teen pregnancy decreased, three of four targeted healthcare-associated infections decreased, one of two targeted foodborne infections decreased, breastfeeding at six months increased, and motor vehicle fatalities decreased. There was little or no progress reducing childhood obesity, catheter-associated urinary tract infections, or foodborne illness from Salmonella. A Public Health Associate Program trained new public health specialists at state and local health departments. Frieden called antimicrobial resistance “a threat to our economic stability and to modern medicine” and drew attention to the overprescription of and increase in deaths from opioids and oversaw a controversial CDC on prescribing practices. The guideline was criticized for resulting in excessive restrictions on opioid prescribing; critiques were at least in part the result of opioid industry influence. While director, drug overdose deaths in the U.S. rose significantly—from approximately 37,000 deaths in 2009 to around 63,600 in 2016, and about 70,200 in 2017 (though Frieden resigned early that year)--during his tenure approximately 370,000 to 400,000 Americans died from drug overdoses.

=== Non-profit leadership: Resolve to Save Lives ===
In 2017, Frieden started leading an initiative called "Resolve to Save Lives" to prevent cardiovascular disease and epidemics. The effort is funded by Bloomberg Philanthropies, the Chan Zuckerberg Initiative and the Bill & Melinda Gates Foundation. Proposed strategies are being tried in various countries including India, China, and Nigeria. These strategies include working with the World Health Organization to eliminate trans fat, reduce salt consumption worldwide. and scale up treatment for high blood pressure. The salt reduction effort is controversial, with some scientists stating that lower sodium intake may harm some people. The initiative also works to make countries better prepared for epidemics and have funding to fill preparedness gaps.

Frieden appeared widely in US and global media during the COVID-19 pandemic and became a leading voice sharing science-based analysis of the pandemic via Twitter, while advocating for increased pandemic preparedness, vaccine equity, and stronger public health systems. He appeared on many news shows including The Today Show, CBS News, CNN, PBS, Good Morning America, BBC World News, MSNBC, and was quoted in The New York Times, The Wall Street Journal, The Washington Post, STAT, The Hill, and published articles in leading outlets including on pandemic preparedness, global health security, primary health care, and cardiovascular health. Frieden's op-eds on the pandemic were published in The New York Times, The Wall Street Journal, The Washington Post, and Foreign Affairs.

Frieden argued against both broad-based lockdowns and school closures and supported mask use, selective indoor closures when hospitals were overwhelmed pre-vaccine, and COVID-19 vaccination. In March 2020, he warned that COVID-19 could kill one million Americans; the U.S. death toll exceeded one million by 2022.

Frieden co-authored a commentary with Former CDC Directors Jeffrey Koplan, David Satcher, Julie Gerberding, and Richard Besser calling for public health to lead the response to the pandemic, and for a reform of the CDC and US public health system. Frieden identified CDC errors during the COVID-19 pandemic and joined other former directors to support a more robust CDC and resist calls to dismantle the agency. He suggested ways forward to rebuild trust in and effectiveness of public health, including the need to improve disease tracking systems, minimize mandates, and make progress on issues that matter to communities. He has argued that the main lessons of the COVID-19 pandemic are the need for a public health renaissance, robust primary health care, and resilient individuals and communities.

In April 2022, Frieden led the transition of Resolve to Save Lives to become an independent, U.S.-based not-for-profit organization after five years of rapid expansion incubated at Vital Strategies.

Working with the World Health Organization, Resolve to Save Lives partnered with countries to expand trans fat bans to more than 40% of the world population. It is estimated that these bans will save millions of lives. Frieden has noted that cardiovascular disease kills far more people than Covid, and called for more action to reduce its three leading preventable causes: tobacco use, hypertension, and air pollution. Resolve to Save Lives supports treatment of hypertension and diabetes, and created Simple, an app to improve care of patient care. The organization has highlighted unsung successes in public health, including Epidemics That Didn't Happen, and proposed a global target to reduce the risk of the next pandemic, 7-1-7: 7 days to find every outbreak, 1 day to report it to public health, and 7 days to have all essential control measures in place. The 7-1-7 target has been adopted by the World Health Organization and more than two dozen countries and can accelerate improvements in preparedness.

== Arrest and charge for forcible touching, sex abuse, and harassment (Brooklyn) ==
Dr. Tom Frieden surrendered to Brooklyn Special Victim's Unit August 24, 2018 to face charges that he groped a woman. Frieden was charged with forcible touching, sex abuse and harassment and was scheduled to appear in court in Brooklyn for his arraignment . According to sources, Frieden grabbed the victim, whom he has known for two decades, as they, along with others, were leaving his home. A representative of the Brooklyn District Attorney’s Office communicated to the press that Frieden was arraigned and released without bail. The judge also issued an order of protection that prevented him from having contact with the victim. New York State penal law classifies forcible touching as a class A misdemeanor that involves a person “intentionally, and for no legitimate purpose” forcibly touching “the sexual or other intimate parts of another person for the purpose of degrading or abusing such person, or for the purpose of gratifying the actor’s sexual desire. Examples of forcible touching are squeezing, grabbing, or pinching, and, according to the Rape, Abuse & Incest National Network (RAINN), the penalty for a conviction is up to one year in prison. In Brooklyn Criminal Court on June 4, 2019, Frieden plead guilty to disorderly conduct News. In return, Frieden avoided jail time, and the criminal charges were dropped. As part of the plea deal, Frieden also accepted an order to stay away from the woman — a long time family friend-- for a year. The plea deal included expungement of his record at the end of a year if he had no further violations.

== Public Health Concepts and Advocacy ==
Frieden developed the "Public Health Impact Pyramid," an influential framework that organizes public health interventions from societal changes to individual counseling based on their population impact and effort needed. His work in public health analytics has emphasized the importance of using multiple forms of evidence beyond randomized controlled trials. Building on work by Nobel Laureate Angus Deaton and others, he has argued that although trials provide valuable evidence, other study designs may better answer some public health questions. In global health policy, Frieden has advocated for restructuring World Bank health spending, eliminating cholera as both an immediate priority and preparation for future pandemics, and developing epidemic-ready primary health care systems. He has also called for more aggressive responses to emerging threats such as avian influenza.

== Personal life ==
Frieden has two children, and his brother, Jeff Frieden, is a political scientist. Frieden is Jewish.

In 2017, Frieden was awarded an honorary Sc.D. degree from New York University.

In 2018, Frieden faced misdemeanor charges of forcible touching, third-degree sexual abuse and second-degree harassment. All charges were dropped. He pled guilty to disorderly conduct. Frieden is Jewish.

== Publications ==
Frieden has published more than 200 peer reviewed articles.

- Frieden TR., Lee CT, Lamorde M, Nielsen M, McClelland A, Tangcharoensathien V. The road to achieving epidemic-ready primary health care. Lancet. 2023;8: e383–90
- Frieden TR, Lee CT, Bochner AF, Buissonnière M, McClelland A. 7-1-7 : an organising principle, target, and accountability metric to make the world safer from pandemics. Lancet. 2021[online] S0140-6736(21)01250-2.
- Frieden TR., Foti KE. National Initiatives to Prevent Myocardial Infarction and Stroke. JAMA. 2021; 0905.
- Frieden TR, Rajkumar R., Mostashari F. We Must Fix US Health and Public Health Policy. AJPH. 2021; 111(4):623-627.
- Frieden TR, Cobb LK, Leidig RC, Mehta S, Kass D. Reducing Premature Mortality from Cardiovascular and Other Non-Communicable Diseases by One Third: Achieving Sustainable Development Goal Indicator 3.4.1. Global Heart. 2020;15(1):50.
- Cobb LK, Frieden TR, Appel LJ. No U-turn on sodium reduction. J Clin Hypertens. 2020;00:1-5.
- Kontis V, Cobb LK, Mathers CD, Frieden TR, Ezzati M, Danaei G. Three public health interventions could save 94 million lives in 25 years. Circulation. 2019;140(9):715-725.
- Frieden, Thomas R.; Varghese, Cherian V.; Kishore, Sandeep P.; Campbell, Norman R.C.; Moran, Andrew E.; Padwal, Raj; Jaffe, Marc G. (September 23, 2019). "Scaling up effective treatment of hypertension—A pathfinder for universal health coverage". The Journal of Clinical Hypertension. 21 (10): 1442–1449. doi:10.1111/jch.13655. PMC 8030517. PMID 31544349.
- Ghebreyesus, Tedros Adhanom; Frieden, Thomas R (May 2018). "REPLACE: a roadmap to make the world trans fat free by 2023". The Lancet. 391 (10134): 1978–1980. doi:10.1016/S0140-6736(18)31083-3. PMID 29773233. S2CID 21699318.
- Frieden, Thomas R.; Bloomberg, Michael R. (February 17, 2018). "Saving an additional 100 million lives". The Lancet. 391 (10121): 709–712. doi:10.1016/S0140-6736(17)32443-1. ISSN 0140-6736. PMID 28916368. S2CID 33616965.
- Frieden, Thomas R. (March 1, 2017). "A Safer, Healthier U.S.: The Centers for Disease Control and Prevention, 2009–2016". American Journal of Preventive Medicine. 52 (3): 263–275. doi:10.1016/j.amepre.2016.12.024. ISSN 0749-3797. PMID 28089492.
- Frieden, Thomas R.; Schuchat, Anne; Petersen, Lyle R. (October 11, 2016). "Zika Virus 6 Months Later". JAMA. 316 (14): 1443–1444. doi:10.1001/jama.2016.11941. ISSN 0098-7484. PMID 27532277.
- Frieden, Thomas R. (August 9, 2016). "Sodium Reduction—Saving Lives by Putting Choice Into Consumers' Hands". JAMA. 316 (6): 579–80. doi:10.1001/jama.2016.7992. PMID 27249371.
- Frieden, Thomas R.; Houry, Debra (April 21, 2016). "Reducing the Risks of Relief — The CDC Opioid-Prescribing Guideline". New England Journal of Medicine. 374 (16): 1501–1504. doi:10.1056/NEJMp1515917. PMC 4852278. PMID 26977701.
- Frieden, Thomas R. (October 29, 2015). "The Future of Public Health". New England Journal of Medicine. 373 (18): 1748–1754. doi:10.1056/NEJMsa1511248. PMID 26510022.
- Frieden, Thomas R. (January 2014). "Six Components Necessary for Effective Public Health Program Implementation". American Journal of Public Health. 104 (1): 17–22. doi:10.2105/AJPH.2013.301608. PMC 3910052. PMID 24228653.
- Frieden, Thomas R.; Berwick, Donald M. (September 29, 2011). "The 'Million Hearts' Initiative — Preventing Heart Attacks and Strokes". New England Journal of Medicine. 365 (13): e27. doi:10.1056/NEJMp1110421. PMID 21913835.
- Frieden, Thomas R. (April 2010). "A Framework for Public Health Action: The Health Impact Pyramid". American Journal of Public Health. 100 (4): 590–595. doi:10.2105/AJPH.2009.185652. PMC 2836340. PMID 20167880.
- Farley, Thomas A.; Dalal, Mehul A.; Mostashari, Farzad; Frieden, Thomas R. (June 2010). "Deaths Preventable in the U.S. by Improvements in Use of Clinical Preventive Services". American Journal of Preventive Medicine. 38 (6): 600–609. doi:10.1016/j.amepre.2010.02.016. PMID 20494236.
- Brownell, Kelly D.; Frieden, Thomas R. (April 30, 2009). "Ounces of Prevention — The Public Policy Case for Taxes on Sugared Beverages". New England Journal of Medicine. 360 (18): 1805–1808. doi:10.1056/NEJMp0902392. PMID 19357400.
- Frieden, T. R; Bassett, M. T; Thorpe, L. E; Farley, T. A (June 7, 2008). "Public health in New York City, 2002-2007: confronting epidemics of the modern era". International Journal of Epidemiology. 37 (5): 966–977. doi:10.1093/ije/dyn108. PMID 18540026.
- Frieden, Thomas R. (February 27, 2008). "Health Care as If Health Mattered". JAMA. 299 (8): 950–2. doi:10.1001/jama.299.8.950. PMID 18314438.
- Radhakrishna, S; Frieden, TR; Subramani, R; Santha, T; Narayanan, PR; Indian Council of Medical, Research. (March 2007). "Additional risk of developing TB for household members with a TB case at home at intake: a 15-year study". The International Journal of Tuberculosis and Lung Disease. 11 (3): 282–8. PMID 17352093.
- Frieden, TR (March 2005). "Tuberculosis control: critical lessons learnt". The Indian Journal of Medical Research. 121 (3): 140–2. PMID 15802753.
- Frieden, Thomas R. (October 16, 1996). "A Multi-institutional Outbreak of Highly Drug-Resistant Tuberculosis". JAMA. 276 (15): 1229–35. doi:10.1001/jama.1996.03540150031027. PMID 8849750.
- Frieden, Thomas R.; Fujiwara, Paula I.; Washko, Rita M.; Hamburg, Margaret A. (July 27, 1995). "Tuberculosis in New York City — Turning the Tide". The New England Journal of Medicine. 333 (4): 229–233. doi:10.1056/NEJM199507273330406. PMID 7791840.
- Frieden, Thomas R. (March 2017). "A Safer, Healthier U.S.: The Centers for Disease Control and Prevention, 2009–2016". American Journal of Preventive Medicine. 52 (3): 263–275. doi:10.1016/j.amepre.2016.12.024. PMID 28089492.
- Frieden, Thomas R.; Houry, Debra (April 21, 2016). "Reducing the Risks of Relief — The CDC Opioid-Prescribing Guideline". New England Journal of Medicine. 374 (16): 1501–1504. doi:10.1056/NEJMp1515917. PMC 4852278. PMID 26977701.
- Frieden, Thomas R. (April 2010). "A Framework for Public Health Action: The Health Impact Pyramid". American Journal of Public Health. 100 (4): 590–595. doi:10.2105/AJPH.2009.185652. PMC 2836340. PMID 20167880.

Government offices
Preceded by Neal Cohen	Health Commissioner of New York City; 2002–2009	Succeeded by Tom Farley
Preceded by Julie Gerberding	Director of the Centers for Disease Control and Prevention; 2009–2017	Succeeded by Brenda Fitzgerald
