= AIDS (journal) =

- Discipline: HIV, AIDS
- Language: English

Publication details
- History: 1987–present
- Publisher: Lippincott Williams & Wilkins
- Frequency: 18/year
- Open access: Delayed, after 12 months
- Impact factor: 4.632 (2021)

Standard abbreviations
- ISO 4: AIDS

Indexing
- CODEN: AIDSET
- ISSN: 0269-9370 (print); 1473-5571 (web)
- LCCN: 90640840
- OCLC no.: 16016361

Links
- Journal homepage

AIDS is a peer-reviewed scientific journal that is published by Lippincott Williams & Wilkins. It was established in about 1983 by Gower Medical Publishing in London, and is an official journal of the International AIDS Society. It covers all aspects of HIV and AIDS, including basic science, clinical trials, epidemiology, and social science. The editor in chief is Jay A. Levy. Eighteen issues are published annually.

== Abstracting and indexing ==
The journal is abstracted and indexed in Chemical Abstracts Service, EMBASE, Index Medicus, MEDLINE, and the Science Citation Index Expanded. According to the Journal Citation Reports, the journal has a 2021 impact factor of 4.632.

== See also ==
- Journal of Acquired Immune Deficiency Syndromes
