= Andrei Doroshin =

American entrepreneur

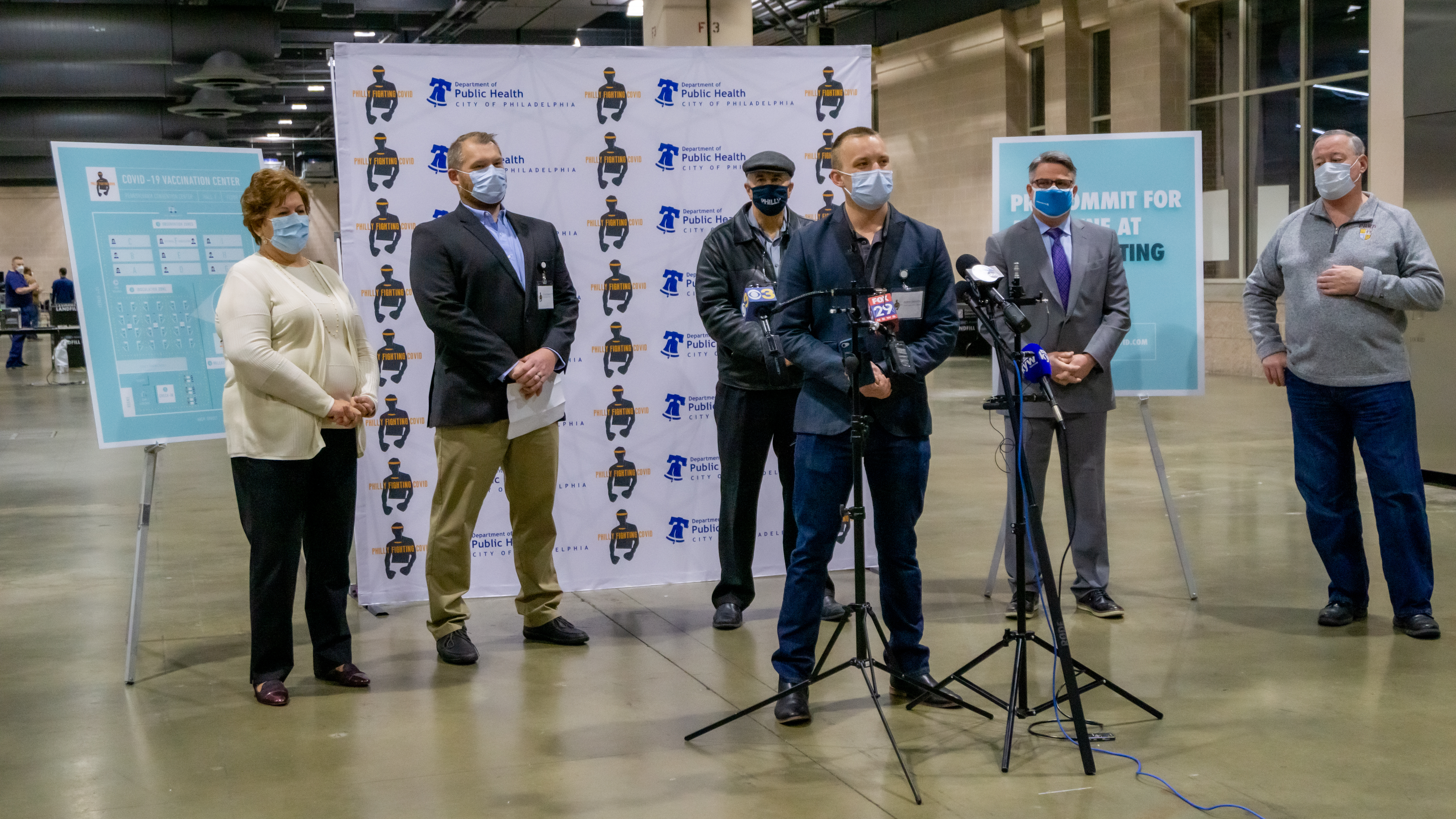
Doroshin at the PFC vaccine site opening with Philadelphia Mayor Jim Kenney, Councilman Bobby Hennon, Councilman Mark Squila, Dr. Karol Osipowicz, and deputy health commissioner Dr. Caroline Johnson (right to left).

Andrei Doroshin is a former graduate student and was CEO of a now-disbanded vaccine distribution group. He is noted for being the CEO of Philly Fighting COVID, a controversial nonprofit organization in Philadelphia, that played a role in the city's COVID-19 response before its relationship with the city was terminated due in part to questions about Doroshin's qualifications, the organization's plans to transition to a for-profit model, and its handling of citizens' data.

== Career ==
Most notably, Doroshin was the CEO of the Philadelphia non-profit Philly Fighting Covid that manufactured over 5,000 face shields, tested over 21,000 people, and vaccinated over 6,800 people before the city terminated the relationship due to a number of controversies. Philadelphia's NPR affiliate, WHYY, describes its 6-part series devoted to the scandal as "the story of a 22-year-old with no health care experience who talked his way into a COVID-19 vaccine distribution deal he thought would make him millions."

=== Philly Fighting Covid (PFC) ===
==== Founding and face shields ====
In March 2020, Doroshin founded a non-profit corporation named Philly Fighting Covid in response to the COVID-19 pandemic. The organization first created face-shields during the global PPE shortage. Doroshin brought together a team of engineers, operations personnel, supply chain experts, and volunteers to build a sustained face shield manufacturing operation. Doroshin oversaw the creation of a research and design facility, manufacturing facility, and a decontamination and packaging facility. In total, Philly Fighting Covid manufactured, cleaned, packaged, and delivered over 5,000 face shields.

==== COVID-19 testing ====
In June 2020, it opened the first testing site in Philadelphia that did not require a doctor's note, patient symptoms, or insurance/payment. Initially, Philly Fighting Covid (PFC) was doing 300 tests a week and operated solely with personal and donor funds.

In July 2020, PFC partnered with the Philadelphia Department of Public Health and received funding ($194,234) to conduct COVID-19 testing. With this support from the city, PFC tested over 1,000 patients per week. The contract did not specify specific testing locations but PFC represented that the organization would focus on underserved communities and frontline healthworkers.

==== COVID-19 vaccinations ====
On December 24, 2020, Doroshin was approved by the Philadelphia Department of Public Health to open a mass COVID-19 vaccine site on January 8, 2021. Doroshin hired cybersecurity experts, software engineers, medical operations staff, process engineers, and contracted with PREPMOD (a software recommended by the CDC) for data management. Doroshin hired over 20 registered nurses, 20 providers (nurse practitioners, pharmacist, MD, DO, or PA) and brought on over 30 nursing students to run the clinic. Working closely with the Philadelphia Department of Public Health, the clinic was opened for healthcare workers in Philadelphia. Doroshin's team vaccinated over 6,800 vaccines in five days of operation. After alerts from the media, the Health Commissioner reviewed Philly Fighting COVID's data policy and raised concerns that it allowed the organization to sell data collected from members of the public.

In the report from the city Inspector General, "Accounts of those who were present during the first vaccination events suggest that most people were inoculated in an organized, safe and regulated manner. PFC staffed the clinics with a number of volunteer nurses, nurse practitioners, physician assistants and paramedics - whom the company solicited and enrolled via social media. Health Department employees who were present described the January 8 and 9 clinics favorably, noting that lines moved quickly and efficiently. Administering personnel screened the patients to confirm that they had enrolled on the PFC sign-up (PrepMod) and were not at risk for adverse reaction to the vaccine. There is no evidence to suggest that anyone confirmed that the patients were associated with the unaffiliated healthcare groups and/or otherwise qualified as first-tier (1A) priority recipients - as long as the patient had reserved the appointment, he/she was inoculated. Across the first two days, PFC administered a total of 2,570 doses and returned the remaining 50 unused doses to the Health Department. The Health Department was largely satisfied with the results of the events, based on the numbers and crowd flow. Accordingly, they moved forward with additional dates: January 15, 16 and 23.65 For these subsequent events, only one Health Department employee was present at any given time, in contrast to the much more significant City presence on January 8 and 9. Broadly, a number of different Health Department employees - including the Commissioner - confirmed that they essentially authorized PFC to administer vaccine outside of the pre-registered population and outside of priority tier 1A if there was excess vaccine at the end of the clinics. As a matter of public health, vaccinating any person was preferable to discarding an otherwise usable dose. Across the final three clinic dates, PFC administered 3,950 doses and returned 690 doses to the Health Department. In total, the Health Department distributed 7,260 doses; of which PFC administered 6,520 and returned the remaining 740.And, according to the IIS data that PFC furnished, the number of inoculated individuals roughly reconciles with these figures." However, witnesses reported that a number of non-medical personnel, without appropriate qualifications, administered vaccines as staff vaccinated themselves with excess vaccines at the end of each day.

==== Controversy ====
Owing to the media-based claims of data sale and for-profit entity conversion the city cut ties with PFC. The City of Philadelphia's Inspector General investigated the matter after the media backlash. The report stated the city of Philadelphia was placed at significant risk due to the partnership with Doroshin. "There was existing and available evidence at the department's disposal, including the dispute about the Society Hill testing events, billing issues, questions about the company's finances, serious problems with data collection on the testing side, negative information in the "secret shopper" review and Doroshin's overall reputation among Health Department employees. This information was never appropriately considered...This was a serious red flag that should not have been ignored."

Doroshin was also engulfed in controversy after eyewitness complaints that non-medical volunteers administered vaccine to one another and Doroshin secured an unspecified amount of vaccine doses and administered to his friend. Doroshin defended his actions stating Health Department officials had authorized PFC to administer vaccines in this manner to outside of priority 1a group to avoid vaccine waste.

==== Aftermath ====
In February 2022, the Pennsylvania Attorney General reached a no-parties-guilty settlement alleging Doroshin violated Pennsylvania's consumer protection, charitable solicitation, and non-profit corporation laws. Under the terms of the settlement, Doroshin is barred from working with charities in the commonwealth for ten years and must destroy all personal data collected by the organization. The settlement also ordered him to pay $30,000, which will be distributed to organizations providing COVID-19 testing and vaccinations to disadvantaged groups. If Doroshin violates the order, he will be liable for more than $700,000 in penalties. The AG did not charge Doroshin for criminal or civil penalties.

== Education ==
Doroshin received his bachelor's degree from Drexel University in 2021. Drexel University later expelled Doroshin during his first year as a Psychology graduate student.
