= Jeffry Frieden =

American political scientist

- Relatives: Tom Frieden (brother)

Academic background
- Education: Columbia University (BA, PhD)

Academic work
- Discipline: Political economy
- Institutions: Harvard University

Jeffry Alan Frieden is an American political scientist. He is the Stanfield Professor of International Peace at Harvard University and chair of Harvard University's Department of Government. According to the Open Syllabus Project, he is one of the most cited authors on college syllabi for political science courses.

== Biography ==
Frieden received his B.A. from Columbia University in 1979 and his Ph.D. in 1984. His research specializes in the politics of international monetary and financial relations.

His 2006 book Global Capitalism: Its Fall and Rise in the Twentieth Century was called "one of the most comprehensive histories of modern capitalism yet written" by Michael Hirsh of The New York Times.

His other books include Currency Politics: The Political Economy of Exchange Rate Policy (2015) and (with Menzie Chinn) Lost Decades: The Making of America's Debt Crisis and the Long Recovery (2011).

Frieden is also the co-author and editor of political science textbooks World Politics Interests, Interactions, Institutions and International Political Economy: Perspectives on Global Power and Wealth.

He was elected a member of the American Academy of Arts and Sciences in 2018.

His brother is Tom Frieden, former director of the Centers for Disease Control and Prevention during the Obama administration and Health Commissioner of New York City under mayor Michael Bloomberg.
