= Current HIV/AIDS Reports =

- Discipline: HIV/AIDS
- Language: English
- Edited by: Paul Volberding

Publication details
- History: 2004-present
- Publisher: Springer Science+Business Media
- Frequency: Quarterly
- Impact factor: 4.382 (2018)

Standard abbreviations
- ISO 4: Curr. HIV/AIDS Rep.

Indexing
- ISSN: 1548-3568 (print); 1548-3576 (web)
- LCCN: 2004212063
- OCLC no.: 54104357

Links
- Journal homepage; Online archive

Current HIV/AIDS Reports is a quarterly peer-reviewed medical review journal covering HIV/AIDS. It was established in 2004 and is published by Springer Science+Business Media. The editor-in-chief is Paul Volberding (University of California, San Francisco). According to the Journal Citation Reports, the journal has a 2018 impact factor of 4.382.
