= Journal of Acquired Immune Deficiency Syndromes =

- Discipline: AIDS
- Language: English

Publication details
- Former names: Journal of Acquired Immune Deficiency Syndromes, Journal of Acquired Immune Deficiency Syndromes and Human Retrovirology
- History: 1988-present
- Publisher: Lippincott Williams & Wilkins
- Frequency: 15/year
- Open access: After 12 months
- Impact factor: 3.863 (2018)

Standard abbreviations
- ISO 4: J. Acquir. Immune Defic. Syndr.

Indexing
- CODEN: JJASFJ
- ISSN: 1525-4135 (print); 1077-9450 (web)
- LCCN: sn99006078
- OCLC no.: 41519710

Links
- Journal homepage; Online archive

The Journal of Acquired Immune Deficiency Syndromes is a peer-reviewed medical journal covering all aspects of research in HIV/AIDS, including basic science, clinical science, and epidemiology. It is currently published by Lippincott Williams & Wilkins. It seems that the editorial intent for its official title is still to end in … Syndromes, although the logo on its website shows … Syndrome as of June 2017, possibly by a graphic-art error.

== History ==
The journal was established in 1988 (ISSN 0894-9255). It was retitled Journal of Acquired Immune Deficiency Syndromes and Human Retrovirology (ISSN 1077-9450) in 1995, returning to the title Journal of Acquired Immune Deficiency Syndromes in 1999. It was originally published by Raven Press.

The journal was an official publication of the International Retrovirology Association until 2000.

== Modern journal ==
Fifteen issues are published annually, in three volumes. Articles from 1996 are available online in HTML format, with PDF format additionally from 2000. Contents over a year old are available freely from 1999 onwards.

According to the Journal Citation Reports, the journal has a 2014 impact factor of 4.556, ranking it twelfth out of 78 journals in the category "infectious diseases" and 29th out of 148 journals in the category "immunology". It is abstracted and indexed by BIOSIS, Current Awareness in Biological Sciences, Current Contents/Life Sciences, Excerpta Medica, MEDLINE/Index Medicus, PsycINFO, and the Science Citation Index.

As of 2007, the editors-in-chief are David D. Ho (Aaron Diamond AIDS Research Center), Paul Volberding (San Francisco Veterans Affairs Medical Center) and William Blattner (University of Maryland, Baltimore).

== See also ==
- AIDS
