= Neal L. Cohen =

American psychiatrist

Commissioner of the New York City Department of Health
- In office January 14, 1998 – January, 2002
- Mayor: Rudolph W. Giuliani
- Preceded by: Benjamin Mojica
- Succeeded by: Thomas R. Frieden

Dr. Neal L. Cohen was the New York City Health Commissioner starting in 1998 and before that, Mental Health Commissioner since March 1996. In January 2007, he began teaching full time at Hunter College as a Distinguished Lecturer in Public Health and the School of Social Work, later becoming interim dean of the CUNY School of Public Health at Hunter College and acting associate provost for Health and Social Welfare at Hunter College.

Cohen has been clinical director and vice chairman of the psychiatry department at the Mount Sinai Medical Center, director of psychiatry at Gouverneur Hospital, and served on the board of the city's Health and Hospitals Corporation since March 1996.

== Education ==
Cohen earned his medical degree from New York University School of Medicine in 1970.

Government offices
Preceded by Benjamin Mojica	Commissioner of Health of the City of New York; January 14, 1998 – January, 2002	Succeeded by Thomas R. Frieden
