= Paul Volberding =

American immunologist and HIV/AIDS researcher

Paul A. Volberding is an American physician who is best known for his pioneering work in treating people with HIV.

== Work ==
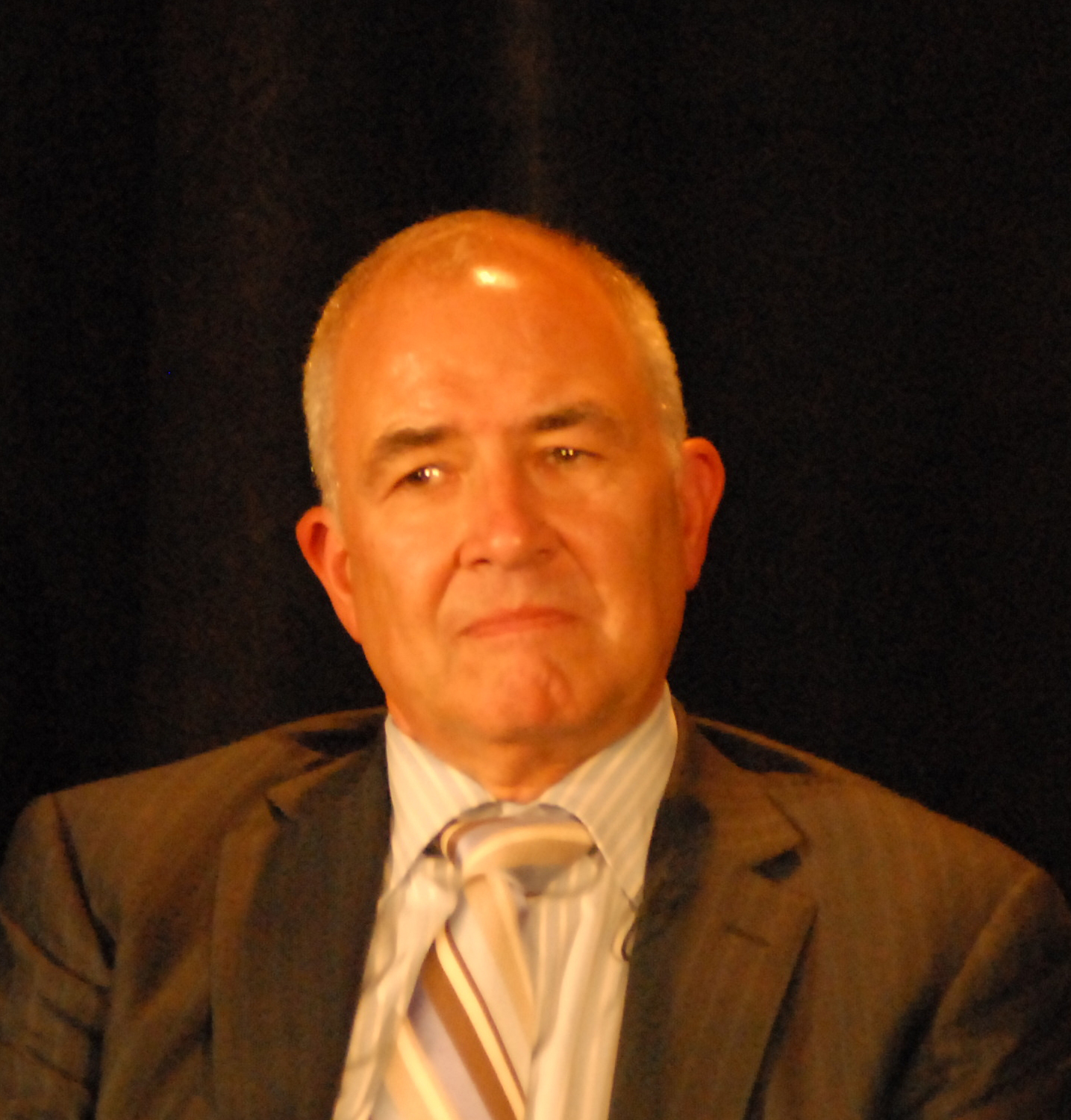
Paul Volberding, 2012

In 1983, Volberding founded the first inpatient ward for persons with AIDS in the San Francisco General Hospital. He worked on early clinical trials to evaluate antiretroviral therapy in HIV infection, and has served on the two major guidelines panels for antiretroviral therapy, addressing issues such as the optimal timing of treatment in early HIV infection when no symptoms are evident. Later in life, he stated he was haunted by the stressful experiences he had during this time of his life.

In 2001 Volberding left the SF General Hospital to become chief medical officer at the San Francisco VA Medical Center, at which time he also became vice chairman of the department of medicine at the University of California, San Francisco (UCSF). He went on to become the co-director of the Center for AIDS Research (CFAR) at UCSF and the Gladstone Institute of Virology and Immunology. In February 2012, he became the director of UCSF's AIDS Research Institute, and director of research for UCSF Institute for Global Health Sciences.

Volberding is also the co-editor of the Journal of Acquired Immune Deficiency Syndromes and the editor-in-chief of Current HIV/AIDS Reports. He is the founding chair of the board of IAS-USA and sits on the board of Pangaea Global AIDS Foundation, advises at the Accordia Global Health Foundation, and is involved in many other activities to support research in HIV and global health.

== Personal life ==
Volberding is married to Molly Cooke, an internist.
