= Georgia Public Policy Foundation =

American free market public policy think tank

- Motto: "Changing Georgia Policy, Changing Georgians' Lives Since 1991"
- Established: 1991
- President: Kelly McCutchen
- Staff: 10 (2024)
- Budget: Revenue: $1.02 million (2024); Expenses: $1.59 million (2024)
- Address: 3200 Cobb Galleria Parkway; Atlanta, GA 30339
- Coordinates: 33.8812°N 84.4561°W
- Interactive map of Georgia Public Policy Foundation
- Website: georgiapolicy.org

The Georgia Public Policy Foundation (GPPF) is a free market public policy think tank based in Atlanta, Georgia. The president and CEO is Kyle Wingfield. The organization's board of directors currently includes eight individuals. GPPF was established in 1991. The mission of the organization is "to improve the lives of Georgians through public policies that enhance economic opportunity and freedom." The organization has advocated for increased school choice through charter schools.
