= PrepMod =

Web application for vaccine management

PrepMod is a web application for vaccine management that helps vaccinators process patients and data. It is developed by Maryland Partnership for Prevention, a non-profit organisation in Massachusetts, USA. PrepMod co-ordinates waiting lists and inventory as well as sends email proof of vaccinations to patients.

== How PrepMod is used ==
A vaccine distributor deploys a copy of PrepMod on a web server. A patient visits that website that is running PrepMod, to search for a vaccine clinic and complete registration. The information is transferred to the clinic who will administer the vaccine. The patient's data is transferred to the state / government. The system can automatically send appointment reminders using email and text message.

== Deployment ==
As of January 2021 PrepMod had been running for four years at public health departments throughout the US, for flu and other mass vaccinations.

In September 2020, Massachusetts became the first US state to adopt PrepMod for deployment of COVID-19 vaccines. As of February 2021 It has since been used by 27 states in the US, including California, West Virginia, and Pennsylvania.

People in West Virginia and Pennsylvania have shared a COVID-19 vaccine registration link to those not yet eligible for vaccination, even though it was not meant to be shared.

== Intellectual property litigation ==
Tiffany Tate, executive director of Maryland Partnership for Prevention and creator of PrepMod, is seeking damages from the Centers for Disease Control and Prevention and Deloitte. Tate alleges the two organizations copied ideas from PrepMod and implemented them in their own Vaccine Administration Management System (VAMS) following a March 2020 presentation to the groups, along with the American Immunization Registry Association (AIRA).
