= Julie Gerberding =

American physician, educator, infectious disease specialist (born 1955)

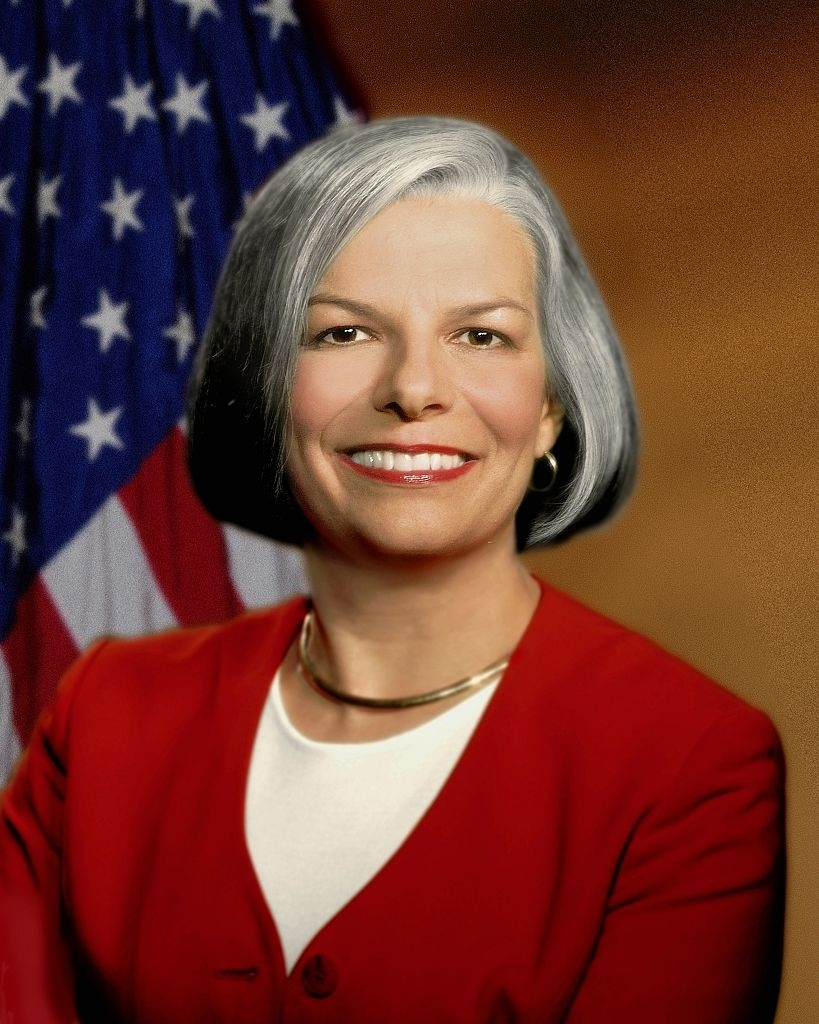
- Gerberding as CDC director

15th Director of the Centers for Disease Control and Prevention
- In office July 3, 2002 – January 20, 2009
- President: George W. Bush
- Preceded by: Jeffrey Koplan
- Succeeded by: Tom Frieden

Personal details
- Born: August 22, 1955 (age 71) Estelline, South Dakota, U.S.
- Education: Case Western Reserve University (BA, MD); University of California, Berkeley (MPH)
- Occupation: Chief Executive Officer for the Foundation for the National Institutes of Health

Julie Louise Gerberding (born August 22, 1955) is an American infectious disease expert who was the first woman to serve as the director of the U.S. Centers for Disease Control and Prevention (CDC). As of May 2022, she is the CEO of the Foundation for the National Institutes of Health (FNIH). Gerberding grew up in Estelline, South Dakota, attended Brookings High School, and earned undergraduate and graduate degrees from Case Western Reserve University. She was the chief medical resident at the University of California, San Francisco where she treated hospitalized AIDS patients in the first years of the epidemic. Gerberding became a nationally-recognized figure during the 2001 anthrax attacks in the United States during her tenure as the acting deputy director of the National Center for Infectious Diseases, where she was a prominent spokeswoman for the CDC during daily briefings regarding the attacks and aftermath. Gerberding then served as CDC director from 2002 to 2009, and was then hired as an administrator at Merck.

== Education and early career ==
Gerberding grew up in Estelline, South Dakota and attended Brookings High School and Case Western Reserve University, where she earned an undergraduate degree in biology in 1977 and an M.D. in 1981. She completed her internship and was the chief medical resident at the University of California San Francisco, where she also completed a fellowship in clinical pharmacology and infectious diseases. Gerberding was an assistant professor at UCSF from 1988 to 1995 and the director of the Epidemiology and Prevention Interventions Center at San Francisco General Hospital from 1990 to 1998. She also earned an M.P.H. degree from the University of California Berkeley in 1990 and was an associate clinical professor of medicine (infectious diseases) at Emory University.

== AIDS research ==
During her medical residency at San Francisco General Hospital, Gerberding treated some of the first hospitalized AIDS patients. She completed several studies on the risks of HIV to healthcare workers, created guidelines to prevent their infections, and established a treatment and research unit focused on HIV/AIDS cases among the urban poor.

== US CDC ==
In 1998, Gerberding was hired by the United States Centers for Disease Control and Prevention as the Director of the Division of Healthcare Quality Promotion. There, she "developed CDC's patient safety initiatives and other programs to prevent infections, antimicrobial resistance and medical errors in healthcare settings."

In September 2001, she became the acting deputy director of the National Center for Infectious Diseases (NCID). During the 2001 anthrax attacks, Gerberding was part of a CDC team who regularly communicated with Congress, briefed the United States Health and Human Services senior staff, and communicated with the public about the crisis via daily press conferences.

In April 2002, after the resignation of CDC Director Jeffrey Koplan, Gerberding became the acting principal deputy director of the CDC and deputy director of the NCID.

== CDC director ==
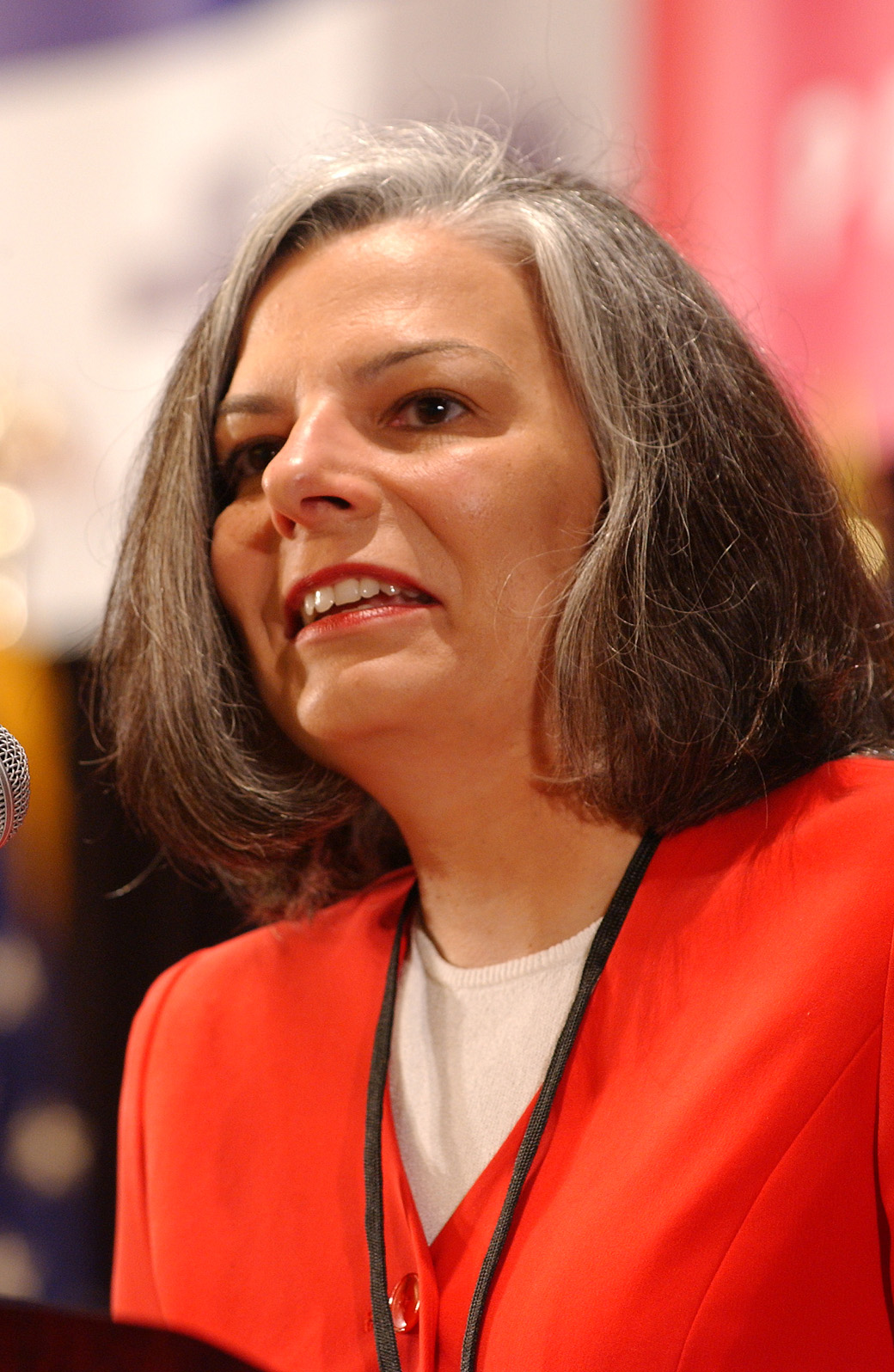
Julie Gerberding speaking at the HealthierUS summit in April 2004.

In July 2002, Secretary of Health and Human Services Tommy Thompson named Gerberding as the director of the CDC and administrator for the Agency for Toxic Substances and Disease Registry (ATSDR).

In May 2004, the CDC announced a significant restructuring to improve its preparedness for several types of threats, to promote health, and to better prevent disease, injury and disability. The reorganization was controversial, and Gerberding received bipartisan criticism from individuals and occupational health & safety groups, mainly centered around the implications of the restructuring for the National Institute for Occupational Safety and Health.

Other challenges of Gerberding's tenure as CDC Director included the American response to the global outbreak of Severe acute respiratory syndrome (SARS) and to several natural disasters, including Hurricane Katrina.

Gerberding resigned as CDC director effective on January 20, 2009, Barack Obama's inauguration day, to enable Obama's appointment for CDC director, Tom Frieden, to assume his position.

== Private sector ==
In December 2009, Gerberding became president of Merck's vaccine division. In December 2014, the company announced her appointment as executive vice president for strategic communications, global public policy and population health. In March 2022 it was announced that she would be retiring from Merck in May in order to assume the role as CEO of the Foundation for the National Institutes of Health (FNIH).

In April 2021, Gerberding told a Michigan news outlet that the United States' response to the COVID-19 pandemic was inadequate and that herd immunity to the virus would be challenging to achieve due to widespread vaccine hesitancy.

On May 30, 2021, Gerberding delivered the commencement address to the Washington University in St. Louis Class of 2020, whose commencement ceremonies were postponed until May 2021 due to the pandemic.

== Memberships ==
- National Academy of Medicine
- Infectious Diseases Society of America
- American Society for Clinical Investigation
- American College of Physicians
- National Academy of Public Administration
- Center for Health Incentives and Behavioral Economics
- Global Leaders Group on Antimicrobial Resistance

== Honors ==
- 2005 Time “100 Most Influential People in the World"
- Forbes “100 Most Powerful Women in the World” 2005-2008,
- 2012 Distinguished Alumnus Award, Case Western Reserve University
- Honorary Doctor of Science, Mercer University
- Surgeon General's Medallion
- U.S. Department of Health and Human Services (DHHS) distinguished service award
- Healthcare Businesswomen Association's Woman of the Year 2018

Government offices
Preceded by Jeffrey Koplan	Director of the Centers for Disease Control and Prevention; 2002 – 2009	Succeeded by Tom Frieden
