= Jeffrey Koplan =

American epidemiologist and physician

Jeffrey P. Koplan
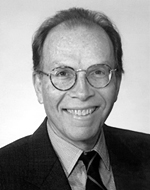

14th Director of the Centers for Disease Control and Prevention
- In office October 5, 1998 – March 31, 2002
- President: Bill Clinton; George W. Bush
- Preceded by: David Satcher
- Succeeded by: Julie Gerberding

Personal details
- Born: Boston, Massachusetts
- Education: Yale University; Harvard University (MPH); Mt. Sinai School of Medicine (MD)

Jeffrey P. Koplan is an American physician and epidemiologist who is the Vice President for Global Health at Emory University. He established and became the first Director of the Emory Global Health Institute from 2006 to 2013. Koplan was the director of the Centers for Disease Control and Prevention from 1998 to 2002; he had previously worked at the CDC for more than twenty years, looking into HIV-contaminated blood, as well as the Bhopal disaster. During his tenure as Director, he fought syphilis, and supervised the investigation into the 2001 anthrax attacks; before leaving the agency in March 2002.

Koplan earned a bachelor's degree in English from Yale University, a master's degree in public health from Harvard University and a medical doctorate from the Mt. Sinai School of Medicine.

== Controversy ==
In the late 1990s, Congress gave the Centers for Disease Control (CDC) $23 million to conduct research on myalgic encephalomyelitis (also known as "chronic fatigue syndrome"). After concerns were raised about how these funds were being spent, an investigation was conducted by inspector general June Gibbons Brown. The investigation revealed that $12 million of the funds were not properly allocated towards CFS research and the CDC had provided inaccurate statements (to Congress) regarding the CDC's investment in CFS research. Koplan defended the actions of the CDC with the following statement: "While CDC is not legally prohibited from spending funds budgeted for CFS on other programs, we acknowledge the importance of complying with the intent of Congress and providing information to Congress."

Government offices
Preceded by David Satcher	Director of the Centers for Disease Control and Prevention; 1998-2002	Succeeded by Julie Gerberding
