= Foundation for the National Institutes of Health =

- Abbreviation: FNIH
- Formation: 1990
- Type: Not-for-profit, charitable organization
- Headquarters: North Bethesda, MD, United States
- Chief Executive Officer: Julie Gerberding
- Revenue: $53,818,891 (2019)
- Expenses: $67,424,608 (2019)
- Website: fnih.org

The Foundation for the National Institutes of Health (FNIH) is a not-for-profit, 501(c)(3) charitable organization established by the US Congress in 1990. Located in North Bethesda, MD, the FNIH raises private-sector funds, and creates and manages alliances with public and private institutions in support of the mission of the National Institutes of Health (NIH).

== Research programs ==
The FNIH collaborates on biomedical research programs to advance breakthrough scientific discoveries. Research partnerships include:

- Accelerating COVID-19 Therapeutic Interventions and Vaccines (ACTIV): a public–private partnership led by the National Institutes of Health (NIH) and coordinated by the Foundation for the National Institutes of Health (FNIH) to develop a research strategy for prioritizing and speeding development of the most promising COVID-19 vaccines and COVID-19 treatments. ACTIV brings together NIH with the United States Department of Health and Human Services agencies, including the Biomedical Advanced Research and Development Authority (BARDA), Centers for Disease Control and Prevention (CDC) and the U.S. Food and Drug Administration (FDA); other government agencies, including the Department of Defense (DOD) and Department of Veterans Affairs (VA); the European Medicines Agency (EMA); and representatives from academia, philanthropic organizations and biopharmaceutical companies including Pfizer, Roche and Takeda.
- Accelerating Medicines Partnership: brings together the resources of the NIH and industry to improve the understanding of disease pathways and facilitate better selection of targets for treatment. Through the partnership, research programs have been established across major disease areas including Alzheimer's disease, Type 2 diabetes and immune-mediated disorders (rheumatoid arthritis/lupus).
- Alzheimer's Disease Neuroimaging Initiative (ADNI): helps manage the Alzheimer's Disease Neuroimaging Initiative (ADNI), a public-private partnership that has identified and validated biological markers that indicate its onset and progression. The study tracks volunteers at clinical sites with normal cognition, mild cognitive impairment and Alzheimer's disease to create a widely-available database of imaging, biochemical and genetic data, which can lay the groundwork for Alzheimer's discoveries.
- Biomarkers Consortium: a public-private biomedical research partnership managed by the FNIH. Launched in 2006, the BC seeks regulatory approval for biological markers to support new drug development, preventive medicine and medical diagnostics.
- Grand Challenges in Global Health Initiative & Continued Vector Research: The FNIH combats mosquito-borne disease through an extension of the Grand Challenges in Global Health initiative, which was supported by the Bill & Melinda Gates Foundation. In ongoing partnership with the Foundation, the FNIH continues work through programs such as Vector-based Control of Transmission: Discovery Research (VCTR) and Support Functions for Development of New Technologies for Controlling Transmission of Mosquito-Borne Diseases.

== Fundraising ==
The FNIH's largest donor is the Bill & Melinda Gates Foundation, which has donated over $10 million from 2001 to 2020. Other large donors include Eli Lilly and Company, GlaxoSmithKline, Johnson & Johnson, Pfizer and Wellcome Trust, who each have contributed between $5,000,000 and $9,999,999.

=== COVID-19 ===
The FNIH Pandemic Response Fund was established to provide financial support to COVID-19 pandemic response efforts led by Francis Collins, then-director of the NIH, and Anthony Fauci, director of the National Institute of Allergy and Infectious Diseases (NIAID).

== Education and training programs ==
The FNIH supports education and training programs by raising funds for fellows and early-career researchers who are working to advance biomedical science. An example of this is the Medical Research Scholars Program (MRSP), which provides one-year of intensive training for medical, dental and veterinary students on the NIH campus with mentorship from top scientists.

== Awards and events ==
The FNIH organizes lectures, awards and events to promote innovative thinking and develop a broader public understanding of biomedical science. The Lurie Prize in Biomedical Sciences is one example. This $100,000 award, made possible by a donation from the Ann and Robert H. Lurie Foundation, recognizes outstanding achievement by a young scientist in biomedical research.

== Patient support programs ==
The FNIH supports programs that provide comfort and assistance to patients receiving treatment at the NIH Clinical Center and their families. For example, the FNIH supports the Edmond J. Safra Family Lodge, which offers accommodations to adult patients receiving care at the NIH Clinical Center and their families at no cost to them.

== Leadership ==
The FNIH is led by chief executive officer, Julie Gerberding.
