= Regulation of oral and maxillofacial surgery in the United States =

In the United States, oral and maxillofacial surgery is a recognised surgical specialty, formally designated as a dental specialty. A professional dental degree is required, a qualification in medicine may be undertaken optionally during residency training. In this respect, oral and maxillofacial surgery is sui generis among surgical specialties. Oral and maxillofacial surgery requires an extensive 4-6 year surgical residency training covering the specialty's scope of practice: surgery of the oral cavity, dental implant surgery, dentoalveolar surgery, surgery of the temporomandibular joint, general surgery, reconstructive surgery of the face, head and neck, mouth, and jaws, facial cosmetic surgery, facial deformity, craniofacial surgery, facial skin cancer, head and neck cancer, microsurgery free flap reconstruction, facial trauma, facial trauma surgery and, uniquely, the administration of general anaesthesia and deep sedation. As is the norm among surgical specialists, oral and maxillofacial surgery residents typically serve as Chief Resident in their final year.

Following residency training, oral and maxillofacial surgeons, whether single or dual degree, have the option of undergoing 1-2 year surgical sub-specialty fellowship for further training in head and neck cancer, microvascular reconstruction, cosmetic facial surgery, craniofacial surgery and cranio-maxillofacial trauma.

== Board certification ==
Board certification in the U.S. is governed by the American Board of Oral and Maxillofacial Surgery (ABOMS). Oral and maxillofacial surgery is among the fourteen surgical specialties recognized by the American College of Surgeons. Oral and maxillofacial surgeons in the United States, whether single or dual degree, may become Fellows of the American College of Surgeons, "FACS" (Fellow, American College of Surgeons).

== Professional organizations ==
The American Association of Oral and Maxillofacial Surgeons (AAOMS) is the chief professional organization representing the roughly 9,000 oral and maxillofacial surgeons in the United States. The American Association of Oral and Maxillofacial Surgeons publishes the peer-reviewed Journal of Oral and Maxillofacial Surgery.

== Anaesthesia ==
Oral and maxillofacial surgeons are required to undergo five months of intensive general anesthesia training. An additional month of pediatric anaesthesia training is also required. The American Society of Anesthesiologists published a Statement on the Anesthesia Care Team which specifies qualified anaesthesia personnel and practitioners as anaesthesiologists, anaesthesiology fellows, anaesthesiology residents, and oral and maxillofacial surgery residents.

Unique among surgical specialists in the United States, oral and maxillofacial surgeons are trained to administer general anaesthesia and deep sedation, and they are licensed to do so in both hospital and office settings.

In the specialty's infancy, dental and oral surgeons were plenary in the introduction of anaesthesia to modern medicine and the development of modern surgery. In 1844, at Harvard Medical School's Massachusetts General Hospital, dentist, Dr. Horace Wells was the first to use anaesthesia, but with limited success. On 16 October 1846, Boston oral surgeon, Dr. William Thomas Green Morton gave a successful demonstration using diethyl ether to Harvard medical students at the same venue. In one of the most important and well documented events in American medical history, Morton was invited to Massachusetts General Hospital to demonstrate his technique for painless surgery. After Morton had induced anaesthesia, Dr. John Collins Warren, a founding member of Massachusetts General Hospital, the hospital's first surgeon, and the first Dean of Harvard Medical School, removed a tumor from the neck of patient, Edward Gilbert Abbott. The demonstration was performed in the surgical amphitheater now called the Ether Dome at Harvard. Massachusetts General Hospital views the demonstration as among the institution's most significant claims to fame. Upon the successful completion of Dr. Morton's demonstration, Dr. Warren famously proclaimed to the crowded, astonished and elated amphitheater that "Gentlemen, this is no humbug." Indeed, the event marked the beginning of modern anaesthesia and surgical practice in the United States.

Immediately following the demonstration, in a congratulatory letter to Dr. William Thomas Green Morton, polymath and later Harvard Medical School Dean, Oliver Wendell Holmes Sr., father of Justice Oliver Wendell Holmes Jr. of the Supreme Court of the United States, proposed naming the state produced "anaesthesia", and the procedure an "anaesthetic." Holmes wrote to Morton, "Everybody wants to have a hand in a great discovery. All I will do is to give a hint or two as to names—or the name—to be applied to the state produced and the agent. The state should, I think, be called 'Anaesthesia.' This signifies insensibility—more particularly ... to objects of touch." Holmes added poetically that the new term "will be repeated by the tongues of every civilized [member] of mankind."

Dr. Ferdinand Hasbrouck, a New York oral surgeon and an 1870 graduate of the University of Pennsylvania School of Dental Medicine was among the first practitioners to succeed in the regular and commercial use of anaesthesia in private surgical practice. In 1893, U.S. President Grover Cleveland was diagnosed with an intraoral tumour. The President chose Dr. Hasbrouck to serve among his team of surgeons and simultaneously as the anaesthesiologist for the procedure. For political reasons, Cleveland did not want the public to know about his condition. The operation was performed in secret on the yacht Oneida in the Long Island Sound, NY. Dr. Hasbrouck, induced President Cleveland with nitrous oxide and extracted teeth from the corpus of the tumour. As Cleveland recovered from nitrous oxide, Dr. Hasbrouck began the administration of ether for the remainder of the procedure as he and the team performed the tumour surgery. The procedure was a milestone for the practice of anaesthesia. Ferdinand Hasbrouck's son, James F. Hasbrouck, discussed below, was among the founders of the Columbia University College of Dental and Oral Surgeons in 1916.

In 1945, oral and maxillofacial surgeon, Dr. Niels Jorgensen was first to develop intravenous moderate sedation. His technique, administering pentobarbital, meperidine and scopolamine intravenously, was widely accepted and first taught at Loma Linda University School of Medicine, beginning in 1945.

In the United States, a close educational and professional relationship between oral and maxillofacial surgery and anaesthesiology persists to the present day.
