= World Anaesthesia Day =

International observance, 16 October

World Anesthesia Day
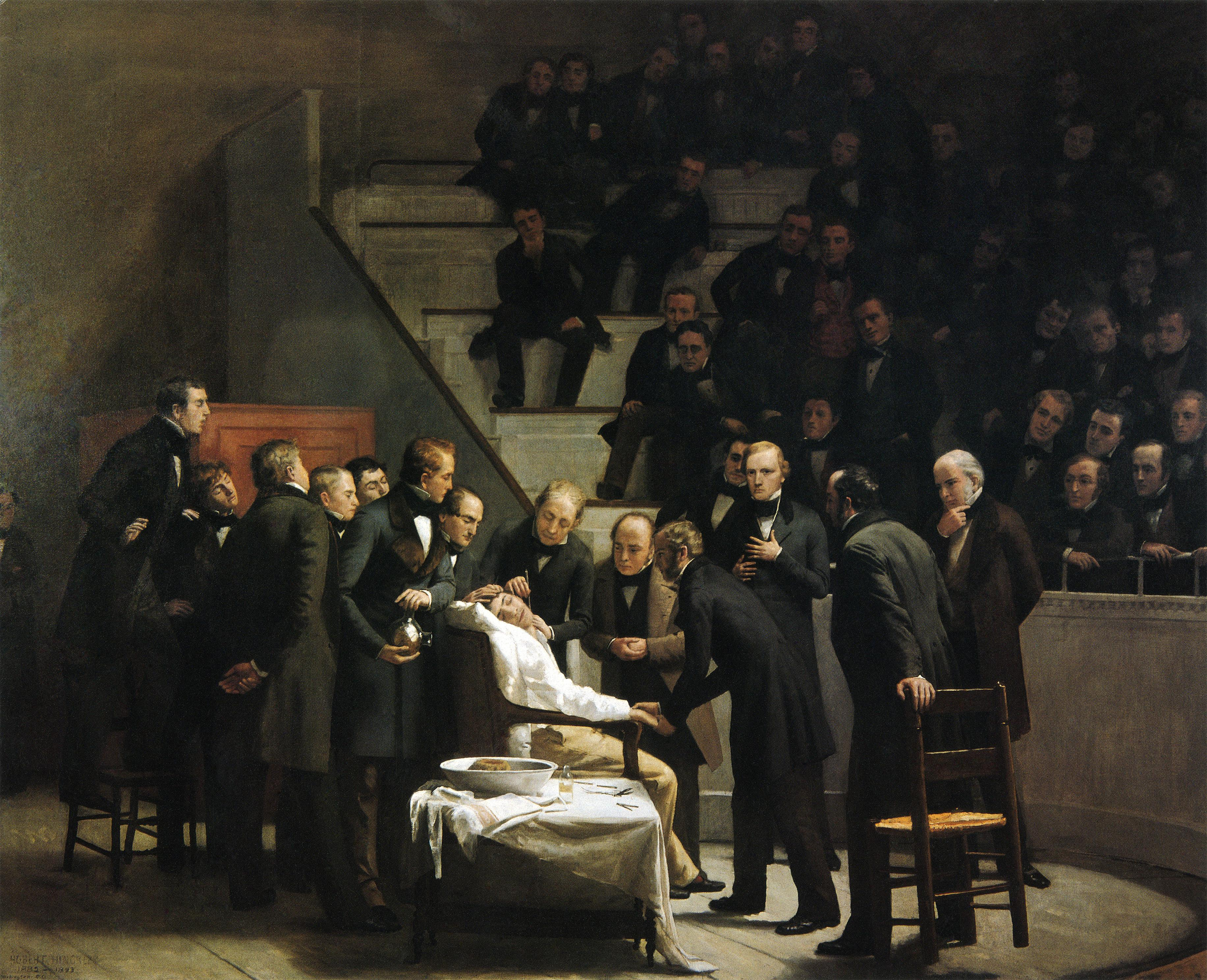
- "The First Operation Under Ether" by Robert C. Hinckley
- Observed by: All UN Member States
- Significance: Celebration and awareness of anaesthesia
- Begins: early 20th century
- Date: 16 October
- Next time: 16 October 2025
- Frequency: Annual

World Anesthesia Day or World Anaesthesia Day, also known in some countries as National Anaesthesia Day or Ether Day, is an annual event celebrated around the world on 16 October to commemorate the first successful demonstration of diethyl ether anesthesia by William T. G. Morton on 16 October 1846.

This ranks as one of the most significant events in the history of medicine and took place in an operating theater (now known as the Ether Dome) at the Massachusetts General Hospital, home of the Harvard School of Medicine. The discovery made it possible for patients to obtain the benefits of surgical treatment without the pain associated with an operation.

Special events have been held to commemorate the date since at least 1903. The World Federation of Societies of Anaesthesiologists celebrates World Anaesthesia Day annually with over 134 societies representing anaesthesiologists from over 150 countries taking part.
