= William J. Morton =

American physician

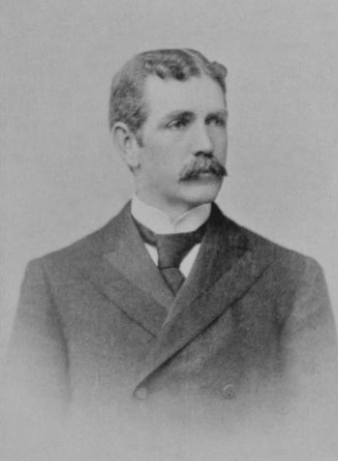
- Born: William James Morton; July 3, 1845; Boston, Massachusetts
- Died: March 26, 1920 (aged 74); Miami, Florida
- Resting place: Mount Auburn Cemetery
- Education: Boston Latin School; Harvard University
- Occupation: Physic
- Spouse: Elizabeth Campbell Lee (m. 1880)
- Father: William T. G. Morton

William James Morton (July 3, 1845 – March 26, 1920) was a United States physician, an authority in electrotherapeutics. During his career he was convicted for mail fraud, for which conviction he received a presidential pardon after serving some months in jail.

== Biography ==
William J. Morton was born in Boston on July 3, 1845. He was a son of William T. G. Morton, whose name is connected with the first anaesthetic use of ether. He was educated at the Boston Latin School, Harvard University and in Vienna. On his graduation from Harvard, in 1872, his thesis on "Anaesthetics" gained him the Boylston Prize. He practised medicine at Bar Harbor, Maine, and in Boston. He went to Kimberley, South Africa, where, besides practising his profession, he engaged in diamond mining. Settling in New York City, he became editor of the Journal of Nervous and Mental Disease.

He married Elizabeth Campbell Lee in 1880.

From 1882 to 1885, he was adjunct professor of nervous diseases at the New York Post-Graduate Medical School, served as neurologist to the New York Infant Asylum, 1887–90, and was afterward professor of nervous diseases and electrotherapeutics at the New York Post-Graduate School.

As an authority in electrotherapeutics, he won wide recognition, and by his mechanical device for establishing the "static induced current" of electricity – the "Morton current" of the scientific world – supplied a means for producing the x-ray, a service of practical value to medicine and surgery.

Indicted in January 1912, in association with Julian Hawthorne and others, on a charge of fraudulent use of the mails in the promotion of bogus mining companies, conviction followed nearly a year after. He was sentenced to 12 months' imprisonment, but was released in October 1913, pardoned by the president and reinstated in his profession.

He died in Miami on March 26, 1920, and was interred at Mount Auburn Cemetery.
