= Ether Dome =

Surgical operating amphitheater in Boston

- Ether Dome, Massachusetts General Hospital
- U.S. National Register of Historic Places
- U.S. National Historic Landmark
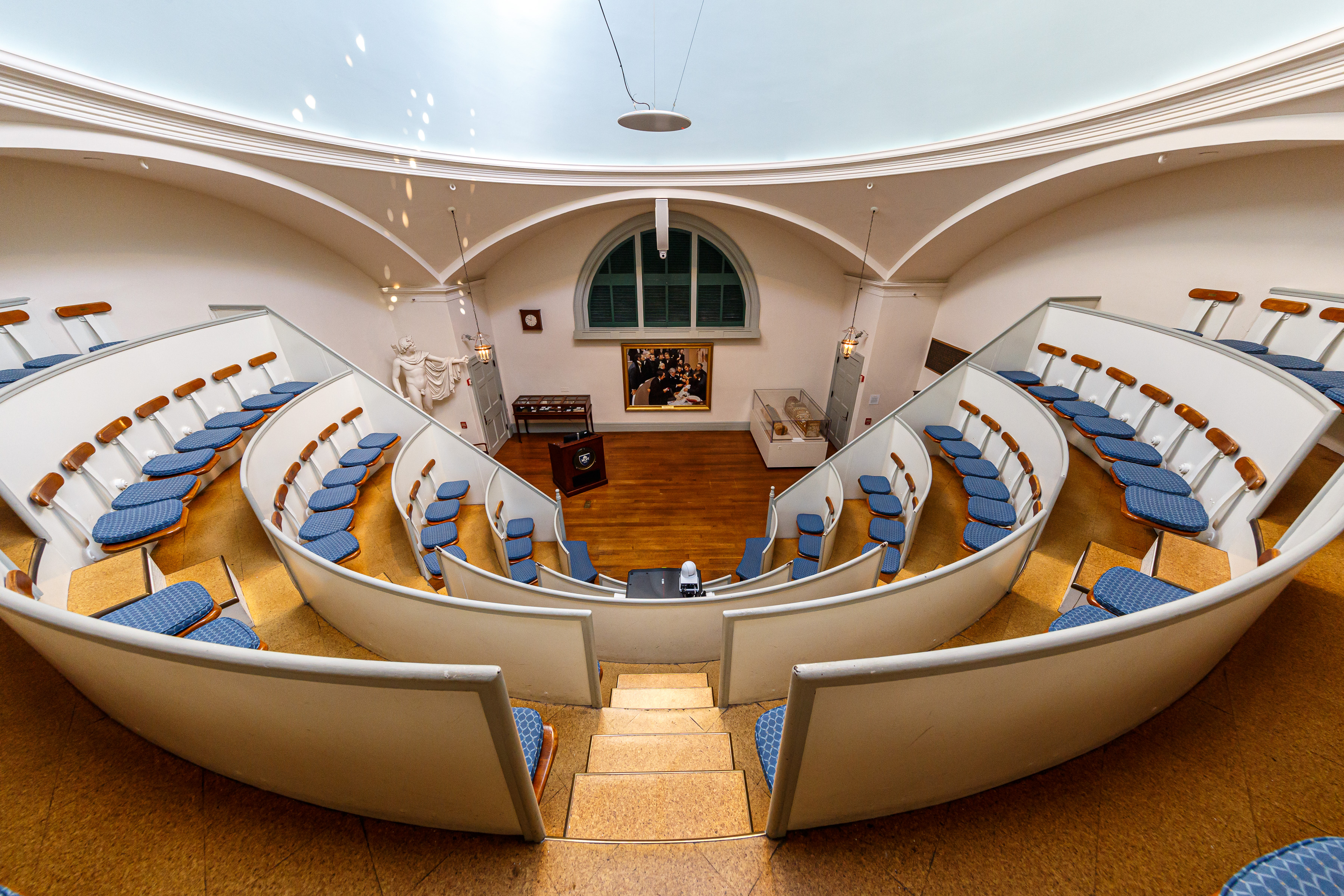
- 2024

- Location within Boston Location within Massachusetts Location within the United States
- Interactive map of Ether Dome, Massachusetts General Hospital
- Location: Boston, Massachusetts
- Coordinates: 42°21′48.70″N 71°4′4.30″W
- Area: less than one acre
- Built: 1821
- Architect: Charles Bulfinch; George Perkins; Alexander Parris
- Architectural style: Greek Revival
- Part of: Massachusetts General Hospital, Bulfinch Building (ID70000682)
- NRHP reference No.: 66000366

Significant dates
- Added to NRHP: October 15, 1966
- Designated NHL: January 12, 1965

The Ether Dome is a surgical operating amphitheater in the Bulfinch Building at Massachusetts General Hospital in Boston, Massachusetts, United States. It served as the hospital's operating room from its opening in 1821 until 1867. It was the site of the first public demonstration of the use of inhaled ether as a surgical anesthetic on October 16, 1846, otherwise known as Ether Day. The Ether Dome event occurred when William Thomas Green Morton, a local dentist, used ether to anesthetize Edward Gilbert Abbott. John Collins Warren, the first dean of Harvard Medical School, then painlessly removed part of a tumor from Abbott's neck. After Warren had finished, and Abbott regained consciousness, Warren asked the patient how he felt. Reportedly, Abbott said, "Feels as if my neck's been scratched". Warren then turned to his medical audience and uttered "Gentlemen, this is no Humbug". This was presumably a reference to the unsuccessful demonstration of nitrous oxide anesthesia by Horace Wells in the same theater the previous year, which was ended by cries of "Humbug!" after the patient groaned with pain.

== History of anesthesia ==
=== Pain relief ===
The practice of pain relief has existed since the time of civilizations such as Ancient Egypt, China, and Greece, in a multitude of various forms. In Ancient Egypt, natural remedies were often used, while in China, acupuncture was developed as a way to restore an imbalance in the qi, or the life force. In Ancient Greece, medical maladies were often attributed to divine influences, and as such, treatments for these ailments would often include visits to temples dedicated to healing.

The use of vapors, which could be inhaled, became more popular in the 18th century as a potential source of pain relief, especially during surgeries, which up to then were generally gory and extremely painful. One of the earliest mentions of the use of an inhaled gas for pain relief comes from the British chemist Humphry Davys, who in his Researches in 1800 noted that, "As nitrous oxide in its extensive operation appears capable of destroying physical pain, it may probably be used with advantage during surgical operations in which no great effusion of blood takes place."

=== History of ether's application ===
Horace Wells was a practicing American dentist in Hartford, Connecticut who is considered a pioneer in the use of surgical anesthesia. In 1844, during a laughing-gas roadshow, Wells cited nitrous oxide—colloquially known as "laughing gas"—as having pain-killing properties. After this revelation, Wells used nitrous oxide as a means of performing painless dental work; specifically the extraction of teeth. In January 1845, Massachusetts General Hospital (MGH) in Boston allowed Wells to demonstrate the method of anesthesia. Unfortunately, the patient did not respond to the dose of nitrous oxide given, which resulted in Wells' endless contempt. Wells continued with extensive self-experimentation, such as repeated inhalation, with various chemicals. There is evidence that suggests a strong correlation between his inhalation of chemicals to a drastic change in personality. In fact, he was imprisoned for throwing acid at individuals walking in New York City and later committed suicide while the Paris Medical Society named him the discoverer of anesthetic gases.

As a former partner in Wells' practice, William T.G. Morton learned the technique and began experimenting on his own, and in October 1846 Morton successfully demonstrated ether anesthesia. However, Morton's interest in surgical anesthesia was not solely influenced by Horace Wells, but also Charles T. Jackson and Nathan Cooley Keep.

Charles T. Jackson was a professor of chemistry at Harvard University after practicing as a medical doctor for four years before establishing his chemistry laboratory to teach analytical chemistry. It is speculated that Jackson suggested administering a higher dosage and grade of sulfuric ether to successfully anesthetize the patient.

For a short period of time, both Horace Wells and William T.G. Morton were taught and employed by dentist, anesthesiologist, and first Dean of the Harvard School of Dental Medicine Nathan Cooley Keep.

== Ether Day ==
=== The operation ===
With the help of MGH surgeon Henry Jacob Bigelow, Morton persuaded Warren to allow him to try his technique on a surgical patient. The trial took place in the Ether Dome on October 16, 1846. The patient was a young printer named Gilbert Abbott, who had a vascular neck tumor. Previous anesthetic approaches had utilized alcohol or even a simple blow to the jaw that would render the patient unconscious. However, this was a more delicate surgery, and Abbott had to be tied to his chair so that he would not choke on his own blood.

Morton used a newly developed apparatus, later called the Morton Etherizer, to deliver the diethyl-ether vapors, holding the mouthpiece to Abbott's lips and instructing him to breathe deeply and slowly. Abbott fell into an unconscious, sleeplike state within three to four minutes, and did not react when Morton made the first incision in his neck for the surgery. During the surgery, Warren noted that the blood of the patient was very dark, and thought that the anesthesia might be producing its effect through carbonization of the blood, a remark which was met with a burst of applause. Upon awakening after the surgery, he announced that he had felt a scratching sensation, but no pain. John Collins Warren turned to the observers and proclaimed, "Gentlemen, this is no humbug." Bigelow immediately published an article describing the event and the news quickly traveled to Europe and other parts of America.

=== The patient ===
Among the revolving door of noted physicians and important figures supposedly present on the historic Ether Day, one figure remains constant: Edward Gilbert Abbott, the man upon whom the ether and surgery was administered. Abbott was born in Middlesex County, MA in September 1825. His parents, victims of tuberculosis, left him an orphan in 1832. After a career as a printer and editor, in September 1846, he went in to receive a medical evaluation for a tumor he had on the left side of his jaw, even though it had been present his whole life and did not cause him any pain.

Abbott was given enough ether to make him fall unconscious; he left the hospital with an unremarkable change in the size of the tumor. He was assured—as he probably knew, that it was a benign growth and that he had contributed greatly to the history of medicine. He died in 1855 at the age of 30, leaving behind a wife, a daughter, and a son. The Boston Herald included a mere three sentence summary of his life and descendants in its December 1 issue.

=== The original Morton Etherizer ===
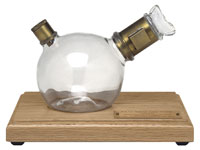
Replica of the inhaler Morton used to administer the ether.

Commissioned by William Thomas Green Morton, the Original Morton Etherizer was used on Ether Day as a means of inhalation anesthesia. The Etherizer was made of blown glass with brass fittings at the two open ends, a middle chamber, and a mouthpiece. The middle chamber held a sponge that was soaked in ether, and the chamber would create gaseous conditions thereby making inhalants. The two brass fittings serve as ventilation so that the concentration of the gaseous ether the patient would inhale via the mouthpiece gives the appropriate dose to be safely anesthetized.

=== The improved ether inhaler ===
On April 9, 1898 Messrs, Mayer, and Meltzer unveiled the newly designed Clover's smaller ether inhaler. The inhaler was modified from the previous inhaler used on Ether Day by adding two circular apertures on both sides of the apparatus located near two small viewing windows. The apertures and windows were used to view the interior of the chamber to facilitate the quantity of ether being administered. Further modifications included the same plated and polished surfaces on the interior as on the exterior. All fixtures on the apparatus are fitted to ensure there is no leakage of chemicals in the chamber or hot-water from the hot-water jacket. The hot-water jacket serves as an insulator to heat the water which then produces condensation. When the condensation is mixed with the ether and is inhaled, it develops the chemical properties of an anesthetic. The hot-water jacket has a detachable screw-stopper that allows the metal cap, chamber, and bag used to anaesthetize the patient to be cleaned of verdigris. All the above-mentioned features were combined with knowledge gained after practice using this inhaler—such as that the slot located near the bag needs to be opened for ventilation after the induction of the patient—combined to develop the new improved ether inhaler.

== Legacy ==
=== The ether controversy ===
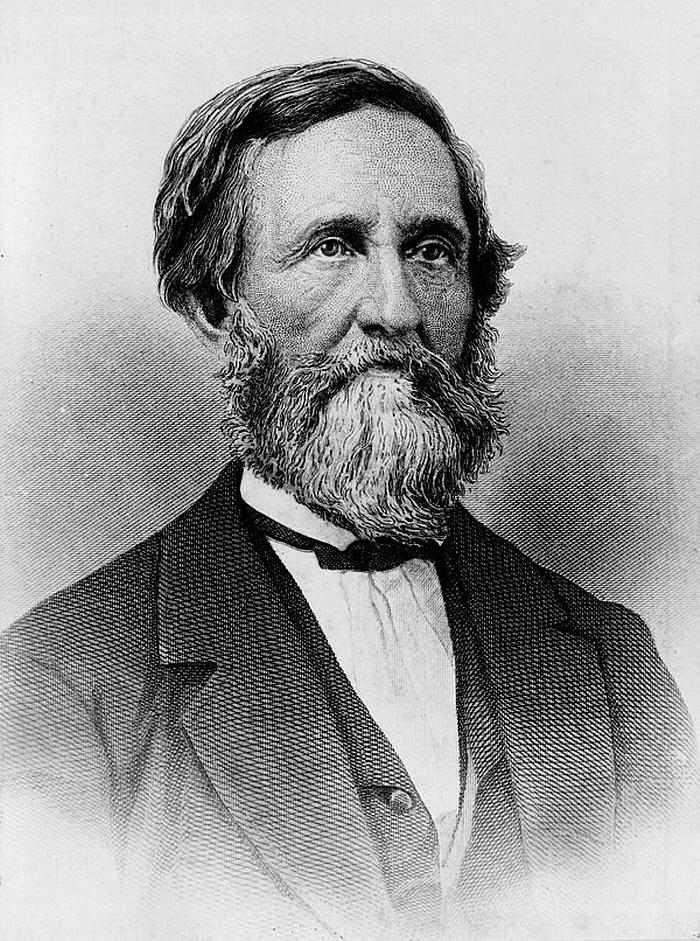
Crawford W. Long

Wells, Jackson, Morton and a Georgia doctor, Crawford W. Long, each claimed credit for the innovation of using ether as an anesthetic.

In either December 1841 or January 1842, Long had introduced the use of sulphuric ether as a substitution to nitrous oxide for the use of entertainment at parties. Long was possibly the first to use ether as a way to alleviate pain during surgery. Long had been using ether in surgery since 1842. On March 30, 1842, he removed a tumor from the neck of a young man named James Venable. Over the following years, Long would use ether in his obstetrical practice, however, he never published any of his findings until seeing the December 1846 issue of a Medical Examiner about Morton, who claimed to have used ether as an anesthetic. Long then began to record his findings and write his account of the discovery. He also collected notarized letters from former patients, but after presenting his findings to the Medical College of Georgia, he discovered two others also claimed to be discoverers: Horace Wells and Charles Jackson. When Long entered his claims, this controversy was already in process.

Prior to Morton's public demonstration of ether, he had supposedly met with Jackson (who was known as attempting to steal others inventions) to discuss questions surrounding anesthesia. It is at this meeting where, supposedly, Jackson had suggested to use ether as a means of alleviating surgical pain. Morton had previously experimented with ether, but never on a patient. Jackson and Morton tangled in a bitter legal dispute and pamphleteering war, that lasted 20 years. In 1868 Morton read a newspaper item asserting that Jackson deserved the lion's share of credit. Morton became feverish, threw himself into a pond in New York's Central Park and died, probably from a stroke, soon thereafter. Jackson died insane at McLean Asylum in Belmont, Massachusetts.

In 1845 Wells had attempted to demonstrate the use of nitrous oxide as anesthesia at MGH but it was "dismissed as humbug" because the patient cried out during the procedure although later, the patient denied feeling any pain. His career then began to spiral down. Wells left the practice of dentistry and his family, and went to New York, where he was arrested for throwing acid on prostitutes. He killed himself in jail by slashing an artery after taking chloroform.

==== The First Operation with Ether ====
The Great Moment is a 1944 biographical film written and directed by Preston Sturges. It tells the story of Dr. William Thomas Green Morton, leading up to the dramatic demonstration in the Ether Dome.

==== Triumph Over Pain ====
Triumph Over Pain is a 1940 book by René Fülöp-Miller.

==== Robert Hinckley's The First Operation with Ether ====
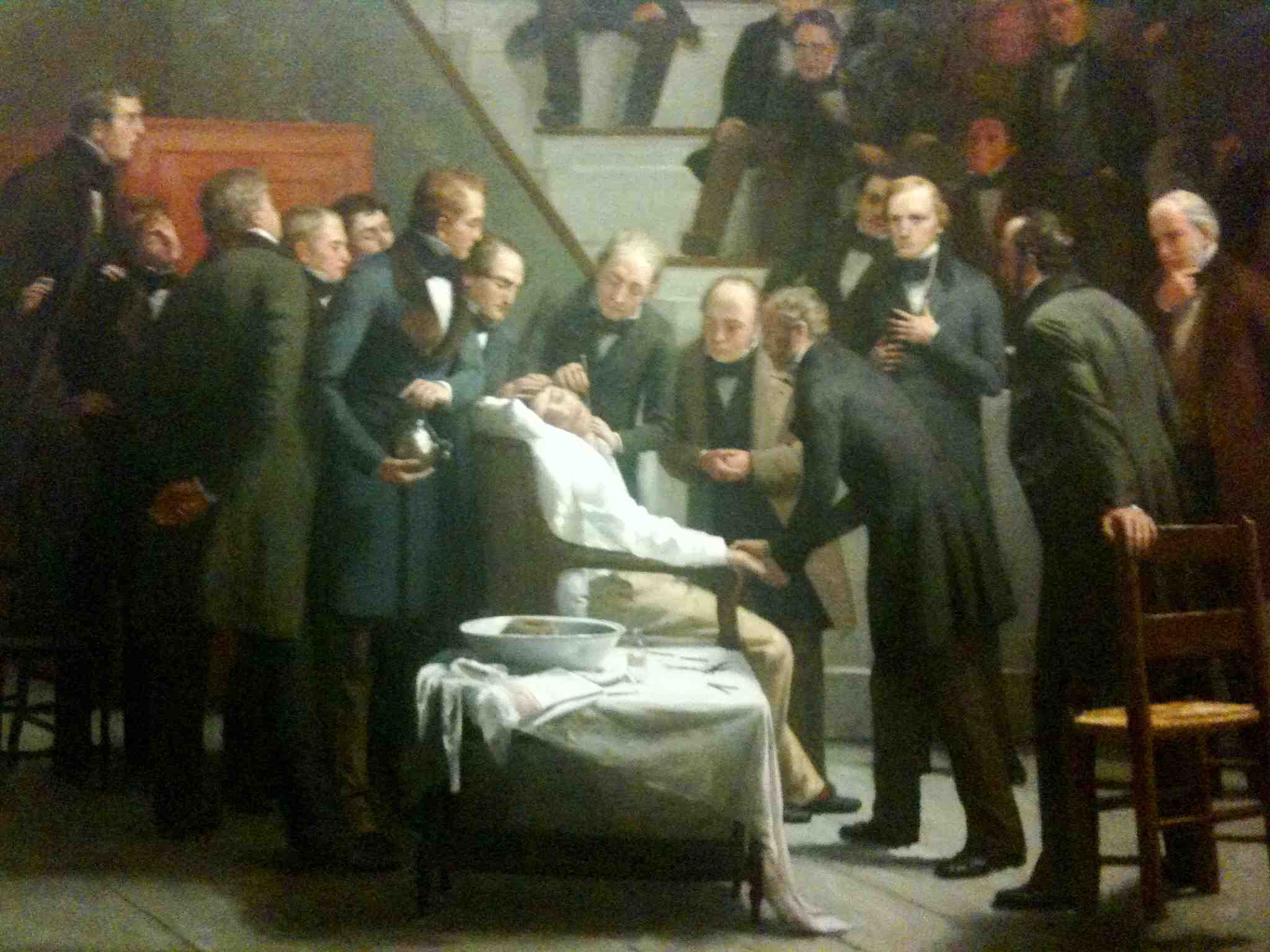
Ether Day, or The First Operation Under Ether (Robert C. Hinckley, 1882–1893) is on display at UMass Chan Medical School's Lamar Soutter library.

Painter Robert Cutler Hinckley meticulously researched the event, particularly who was present and participating, for his The First Operation with Ether (1882–1893). He interviewed various Boston physicians and reviewed records and newspaper reports.

Hinckley uses light and line to draw attention to the surgery; the side wall of the gallery draws a clear diagonal line which ends at the surgeon Warren's head. Morton's ether inhaler reflects light so as to make the sponge contained inside visible. Abbott's shirt as well as the cloth and the bowl on the table are starkly white, directing the eye to the operation. However, the viewer is shielded from the point of incision and from any blood, lessening the impact of the image.

A controversy surrounding the painting revolves around those who are painted into it. Hinckley includes Charles Hosea Hildreth, surgeon Abel Lawrence Peirson, surgeon Jonathan Mason Warren, and physician William Williamson Wellington—all individuals who are highly unlikely to have been present during the operation. Furthermore, he did not include two surgeons who were very likely there—Samuel Parkman and George Hayward. Though it is unknown why Hinckley omitted two individuals, he likely added the others because of their role in the medical history of Boston.The painting is now in the Lamar Soutter library at UMass Chan Medical School.

== Features ==
=== Architecture ===
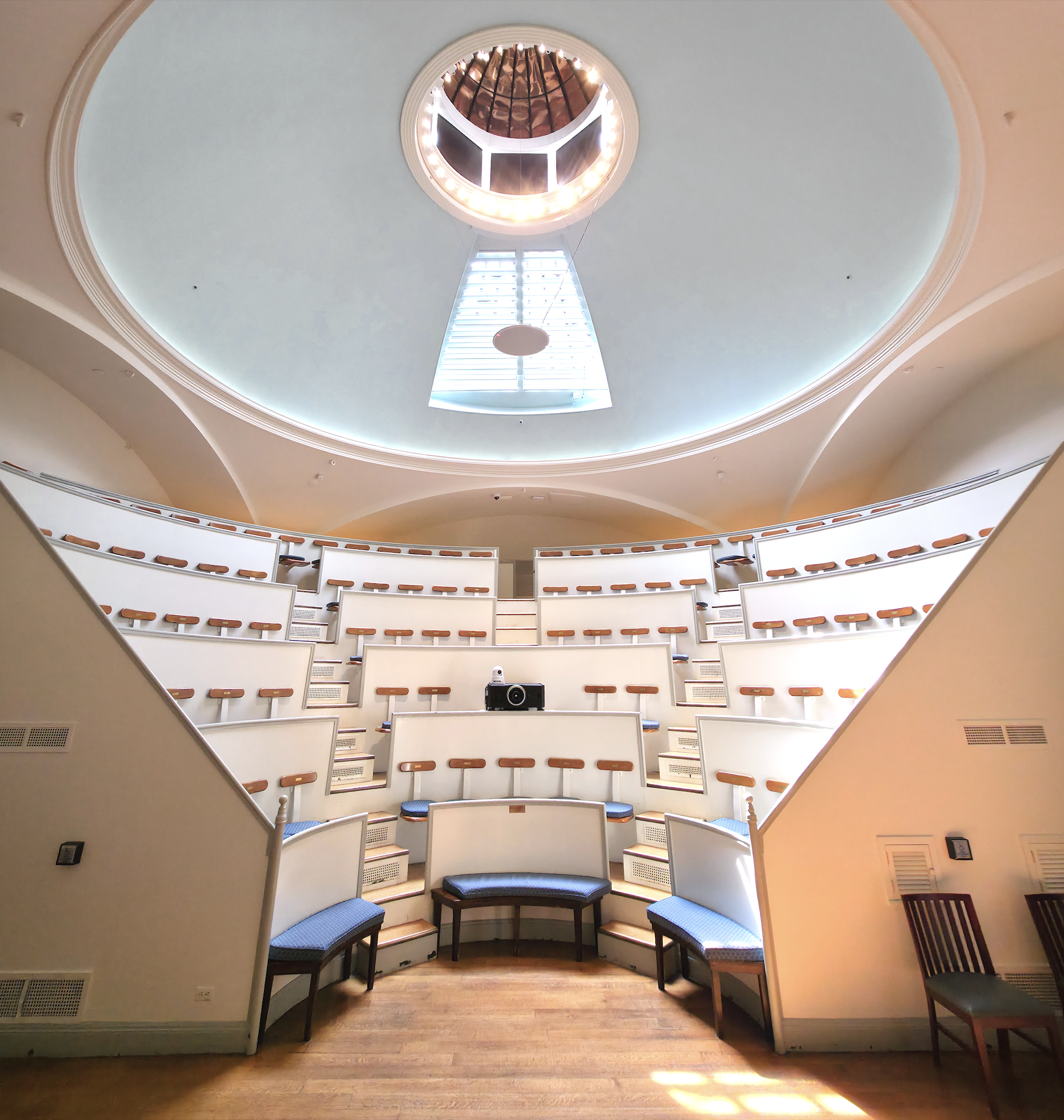

The Ether Dome is one of the oldest operating theatres in the United States. Over the years, there has been a concerted effort to restore the original architecture of the Ether Dome while also incorporating modern technology for educational uses today. Architects and designers tried to maintain the authenticity of the space by relying on historical documents and photos. Additionally, specialists analyzed paint chips from the early 19th century in order to help with renovations and to ensure the damages were repaired.

The dome's architecture resembles that of a courtroom or a theatre house where surgeries were performed at the center of the dome. An audience of surgeons and doctors can witness the surgeries and therefore the room has a number of seats arranged in the style of an amphitheater so all spectators can see the details of the medical procedures performed by the surgeons in charge. A visitor to the room can physically determine that the stairs are extremely steep (noticeably larger than the average stair) and can infer that the steepness is so all practitioners could view the educational surgery. Furthermore, a visitor to the room today can see the names of famous doctors crafted on the seats in commemoration of the physicians who contributed to this tremendous discovery. Extremely curious and tedious spectators may notice ceiling hooks near the base of the dome and wonder if the hooks are original. In order to answer this question, general background knowledge of ceiling hooks is needed. The ceiling hook was invented in the late 1880s originally to mount the newly invented ceiling fan. First, the Ether Dome ceased operation in 1867, making it impossible for these ceiling hooks to be for medicinal use, or any use in fact because they did not exist. Furthermore, only recently have companies been able to design a hook that could hold fifty or more pounds which limits beginning speculations of medical purpose of the hooks in 1821.

Also, the location of the dome and the large glass ceiling and windows that compose the dome let in light for operations to be performed. Modern day surgery theaters follow the same concept of the Ether Dome's stylistic arrangement, however do not feature a dome due to modern lighting technology. However, for hygiene purposes the spectators' section is separated from the main gallery by glass. The Ether Dome and its original theatre style architecture has turned into a nationally recognized historical site for interested spectators, especially students of medicine.

=== The first operating room of MGH ===
The Ether Dome served as an operating theater from 1821 to 1867, when a new surgical building was constructed. Operating rooms built before electricity were typically located on the top floor of a building to take advantage of available light. Before surgical anesthesia the location was also helpful to muffle the screams of patients for those on the floors below. Because pain often induced shock, surgeons of the day prided themselves on the speed in which they could amputate an arm or a leg. Ninety seconds was considered a good time. Two 19th-century operating chairs famously known as Bigelow Operating chair was built in 1854, are located in the display area behind the seating tiers. Their red velvet upholstery was apparently intended to make bloodstains less visible. It was created in light of this discovery; it was the first of its kind without restraints and had ivory and wooden handles that could be used to position the unconscious, anesthetized patient. The chair quickly fell out of use over the next few decades, however, as it was made from leather rather than metal, which can be sterilized more easily.

The Ether Dome has not always served the purpose of an operating room. From 1821 to 1868, operations were performed, it was then a storage area from 1868 to 1873, a dormitory from 1873 to 1889, a dining room for the nurses employed at MGH from 1889 to 1892, and now it is a teaching space. The hospital commemorated the historical significance of the space in 1896 on the 50th anniversary of the first public demonstration of surgical anesthesia. The Ether Dome was designated a National Historic Site in 1965.

While the words "Operating Room" still appear inside the door to the closet on the right of the painting, today the room serves as a place for meetings and lectures. The steel tiers with individual chairs date from about 1930, when fire regulations required the replacement of the old wooden bench seating. The names of the chairs have no known significance—it is likely that hospital donors were given the opportunity to name a chair after a favorite figure from MGH history.

=== Curated displays ===
==== Warren and Lucia Prosperi's Ether Day, 1846 ====
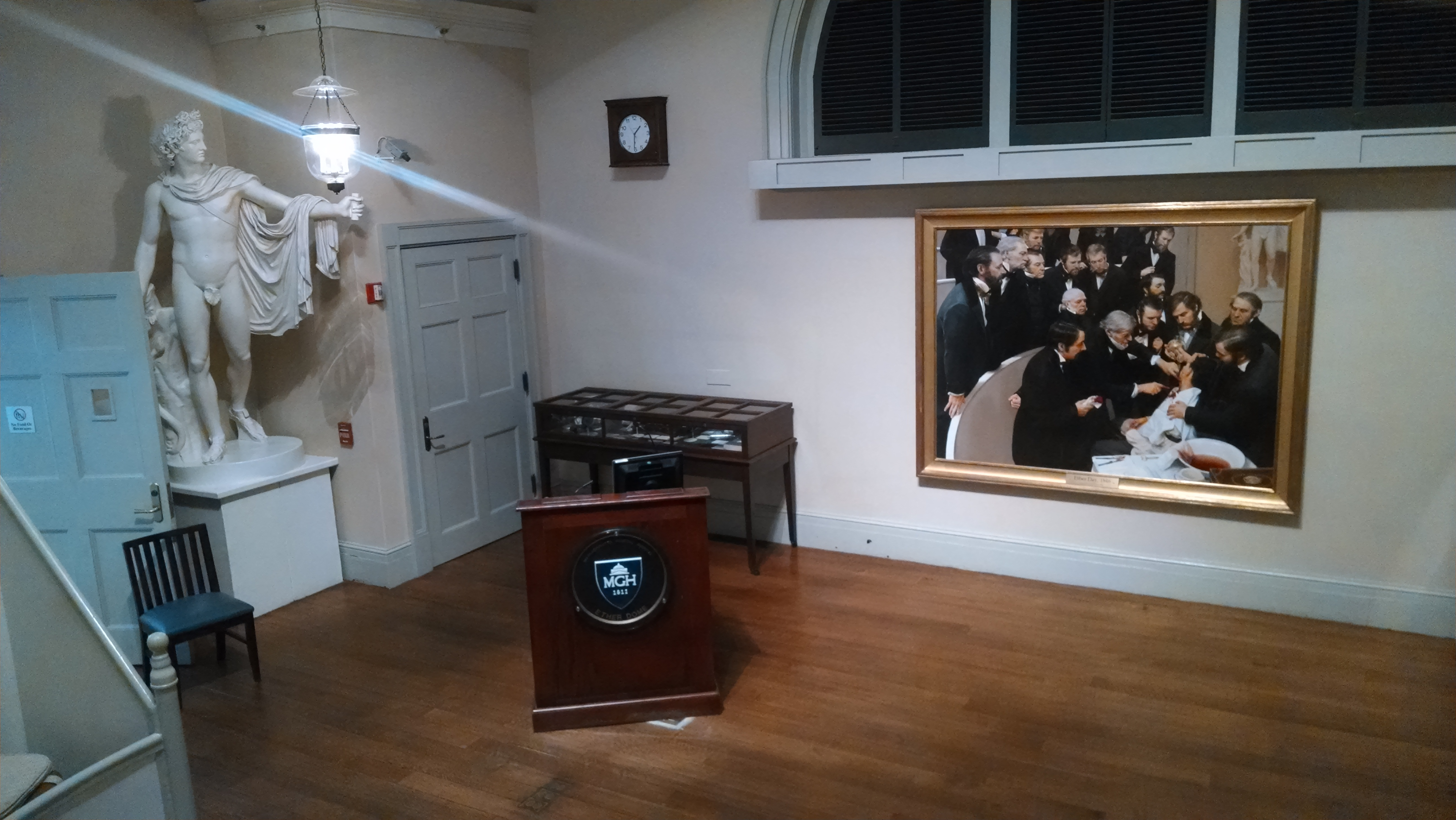
Warren and Lucia Prosperi's Ether Day, 1846 as displayed inside the Ether Dome.

As the 150th anniversary of the first public demonstration of the use of ether anesthesia on October 16, 1846, approached and preparations for the celebration at the Massachusetts General Hospital (MGH) began, it was recognized that a proper commemorative painting was needed. The famous Hinckley image, reproduced many times, was painted 27 years after the event. It is the product of the artist's imagination and portrays, among the actual participants, others who were not really in attendance but are nonetheless "painted into history." Subsequent research has provided a more accurate list of the witnesses.

Accordingly, in 2000 the clinical staff of the MGH voted to commission Warren and Lucia Prosperi, well known for their historically accurate paintings, to "do it right." Artists Warren and Lucia Prosperi created this mural between 2000 and 2001, painting on site in the Ether Dome. To represent the historic operation as realistically as possible, a group of doctors and their spouses, working with the Prosperis, searched out photographs, daguerreotypes, and portraits of the participants. They also consulted vintage photographs and artifacts from the MGH Archives and Special Collections. The theatre department of Emerson College was engaged to provide period costumes and makeup. Much of the original paraphernalia—the ether flask, the operating chair, and various furnishings of the amphitheater—was still in the hospital museum and available for the scene.

On one Sunday in January, 2001, a group convened to re-enact the historic event on site at the original location, MGH's Ether Dome, with the Boston press corps in attendance. Two hours were spent debating the likely orientation of the operating chair and instrument table and who would have been standing where so that everyone, including the students in the gallery, could see the action. Many configurations were tested, and The Prosperis photographed hundred of photographs a cast of 20 men, mostly MGH physicians, who gathered in the Ether Dome in January 2000 dressed in period costumes. Finally the scene was set and recorded.

Over the course of 2001, Warren Prosperi created the painting with its life-size figures on site in the Ether Dome, allowing visitors to witness the emergence of the historic re-enactment. This painting now hangs on the front wall of the amphitheater.

One additional footnote: a special unveiling of Ether Day, 1846 was planned for the meeting of the Halsted Society at the Massachusetts General Hospital on September 12, 2001. Because of the infamous events of the previous day, that meeting was canceled (but held two years later).

As the mural depicts, in the years before antiseptic and aseptic surgery, a surgeon typically operated in a frock coat as was appropriate for the dignity of his profession. The ivory or ebony handles of his surgical instruments signaled his status but made the instruments difficult to clean. Sterile surgery was not achieved at the MGH until the 1880s.

==== Mummy (the hospital's oldest patient) ====
On May 4, 1823, Massachusetts General Hospital received an Egyptian mummy from the city of Boston, complete with painted wooden inner and outer coffins. The ensemble had been given to the city by Jacob Van Lennep, a Dutch merchant living in Symrna, Ottoman Empire (modern day İzmir, Turkey) in the early 19th century. It is thought that Mr. Van Lennep, who was also the consul general of the Netherlands, bought the mummy as a gift to Boston as a way to impress his native New England in-laws.

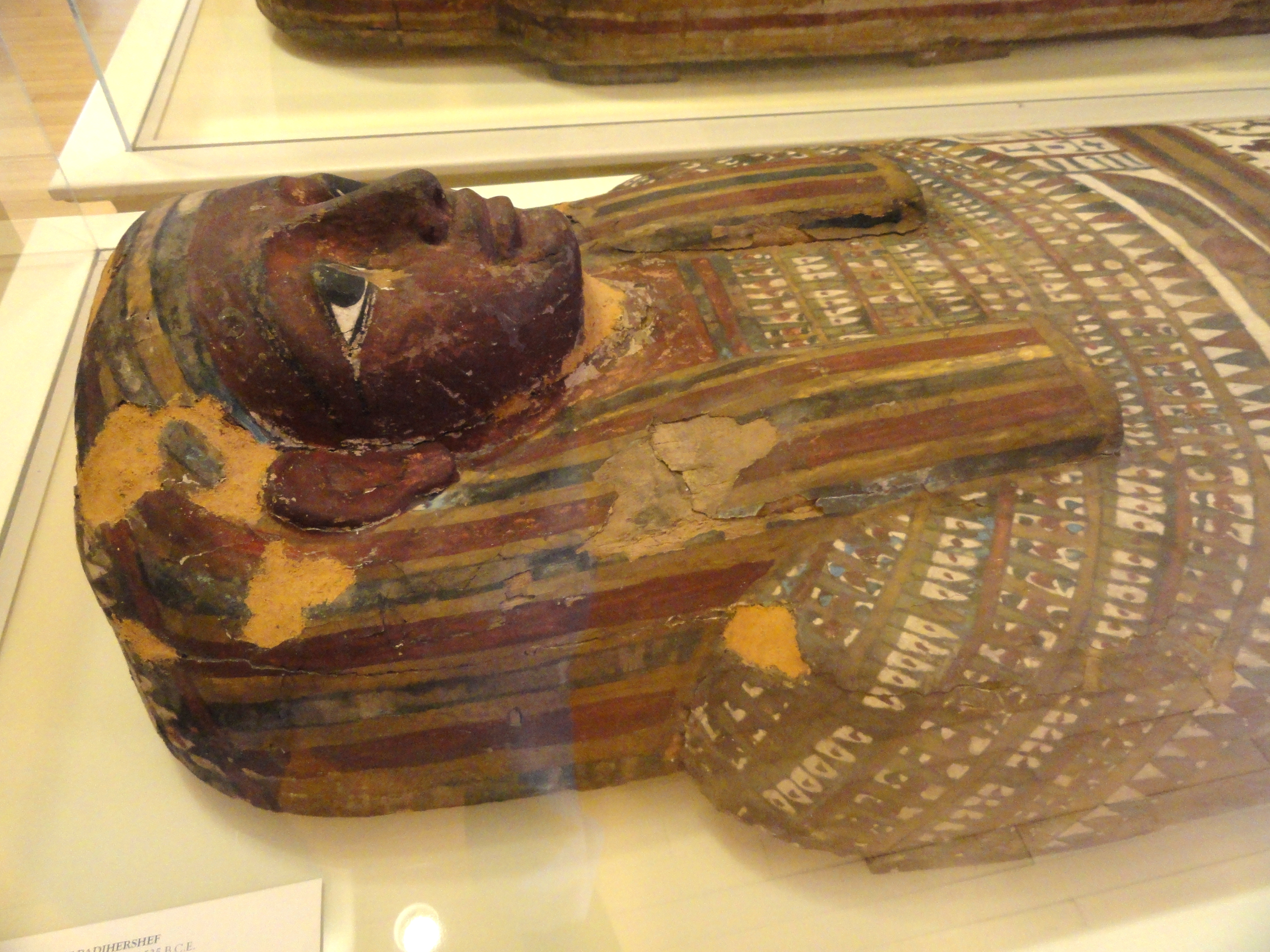
Outer Coffin of Padihershef

The mummy arrived in Boston on April 26, 1823, on the British ship the Sally Ann and was the first complete Egyptian burial ensemble in America. He was placed under the care of the ship's captain, Robert B. Edes, along with Bryant P. Tilden, Esq., who ultimately made the decision to give the mummy to Massachusetts General Hospital, whose trustees accepted the gift as "an appropriate ornament of the operating room," while also hoping to exhibit the mummy to raise funds for the hospital. The fledgling hospital, which had opened its doors just two years earlier, was still in need of operating funds that would help it better serve the sick and indigent individuals for whom it had been chartered to provide care. The mummy would help raise those needed funds.

Shortly after his arrival, the mummy was put on display at "Mr. Doggett's Repository of Arts" in Boston, where hundreds of people paid $0.25 to see the first complete human Egyptian mummy in the U.S. That fall, the mummy went on a year-long (1823 to 1824) multi-city tour of the East Coast, raising even more money for the hospital. Upon his return, he was placed in the Ether Dome where he subsequently witnessed more than 6,000 surgeries, including the famous first successful demonstration of surgery under anesthesia on October 16, 1846.

In 1823, John Collins Warren partially unwrapped and examined the mummy. He then published the first American treatise about mummies and mummification. The mummy spent much of the late 19th century at the Boston Museum of Fine Arts. The mummy's outer coffin has been at the George Walter Vincent Museum in Springfield, MA since 1932.

More than a century later the hospital learned just who the mummy was. In 1960, Dows Dunham, curator emeritus of the Department of Egyptian Art at Boston's Museum of Fine Arts, examined and translated the hieroglyphics on the mummy's coffin. Hailing from the 26th Dynasty (663–525 BC) or later, the mummy now had a name—Padihershef, meaning "He whom the god Hershef has given." and a birthplace—Thebes; and an occupation—stonecutter. Newer medical information tells us that Padihershef, or "Padi", was probably between 20 and 30 years of age and was not a stonecutter at all. Rather, he was "tomb finder," or prospector, someone who looked for spaces in the Theban necropolis that could serve as burial spaces.

Padihershef's remains have been studied by means of X-rays and CT scans. In 2013, a donor provided funds for the mummy's restoration. During the procedure, Padihershef was given a full-body CT scan overseen by Massachusetts General Hospital's radiologist Rajiv Gupta. This scan, which provided more than 20,000 scans that were then assembled into 3D renderings of his body. Many of these are replicated in the report prepared by forensic pathologist Jonathan Elias, PhD, of AMSC Research, a mummy research consortium.

One of the outcomes of the project includes a CT facial reconstruction of Padihershef. Using the scans, 3D facial recognition software and a thorough knowledge of mummy forensics, Elias' group undertook a thorough analysis based on all these factors and using a 3D skull model, developed a representation of what Padi may have looked like in life.

The mummy Padishershef has borne witness to many medical milestones during his 190 years in the Massachusetts General Hospital's Ether Dome. Over the decades, visitors to the room have been greeted silently by this unusual host, standing nestled in his coffin.

Until this most recent examination, little was known about his life before his death. John Collins Warren, MD, co-founder of MGH and its first surgeon, had performed a post-mortem on "Padi" when he first came to the MGH, which included uncovering the mummy's head, as it remains today. In 1931, and again in 1977, X-rays were taken of Padi in his case, which provided a little more insight into his health. Growth lines show that Padi was so ill as a child that his growth stopped for some time before he was well again. Bone damage reveals that he suffered from arthritis. The extensive report included here provides many details of Padi's life that were unknown to us until his March 2013 scanning examination.

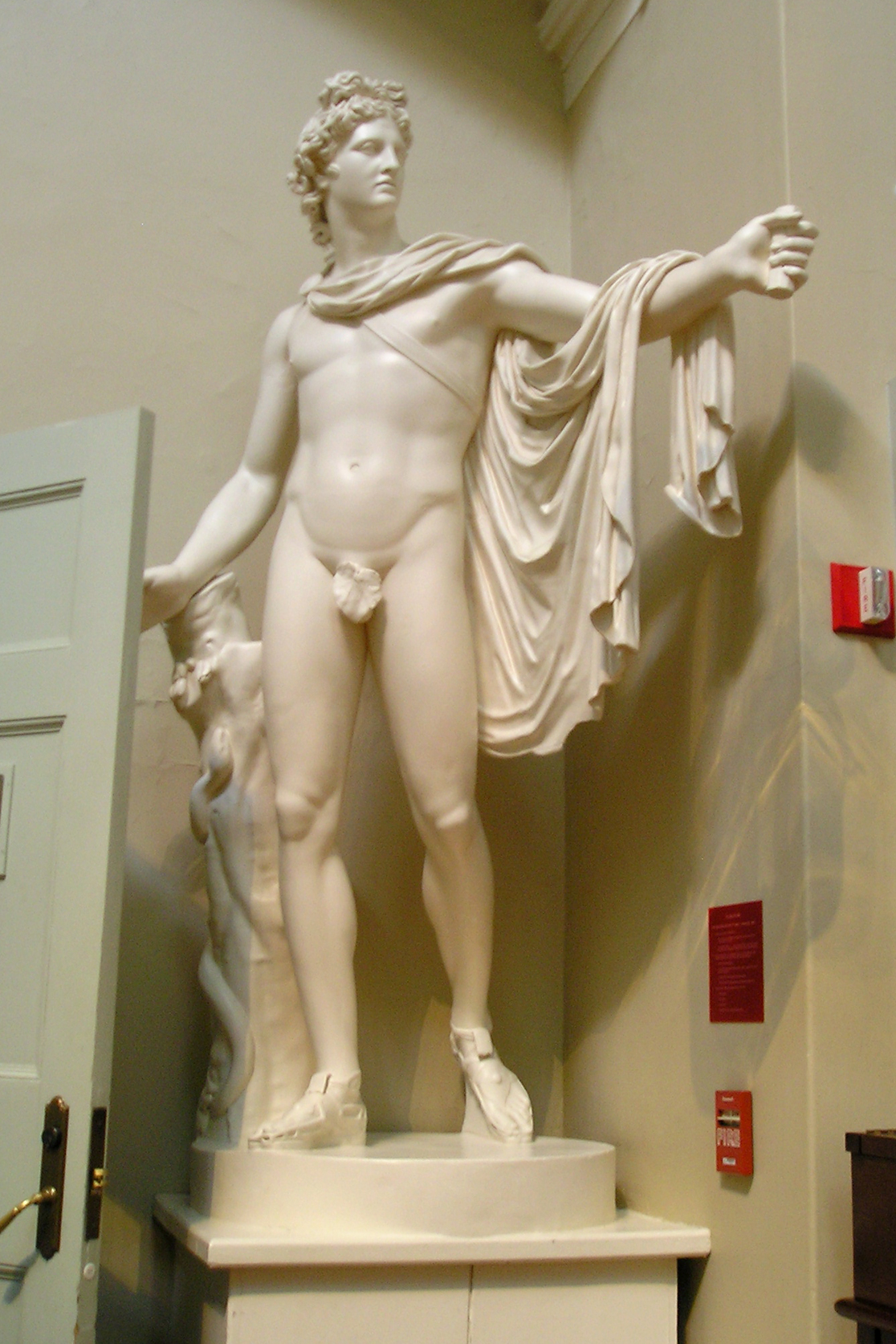
The Apollo Belvedere Statue at MGH.

Padi has been restored twice before: once in the 1980s and again in 2002. Salt deposits that build up from the embalming elixir have formed on the exposed portions of Padi's face and head need to be removed periodically. The restoration also included replacing the old grass and wood case with the current climate-controlled enclosure.

==== The Apollo Belvedere Statue ====
The plaster statue of Apollo in the Ether Dome was given to the M by statesman and orator, Honorable Edward Everett in March 1845. In exchange, the hospital trustees presented to him "their grateful acknowledgments for his beautiful gift, valuable as a memorial, that, amidst his arduous public duties in a foreign country, Mr. Everett feels an undiminished interest in the charitable institutions of his native land." Everett wanted to exude his appreciation of MGH being a charitable institution—a voluntary hospital with a mission of treating the often poor patients who were in dire need of assistance. In return for the gifted statue of Apollo, the trustees of MGH kept this statue in the Ether Dome as a memorial to his philanthropic acts.

The displayed work is a copy of the original Apollo Belvedere, a sculpture unearthed in Rome during the Renaissance. Napoleon looted Rome in the early 19th century and took the Apollo Belvedere from the Vatican to the Louvre in Paris. where the statue that is on display was crafted. The Louvre made and sold plaster casts of the statue, one of which Everett bought and shipped back to Boston. The English sea captain and novelist Frederick Marryat decried, while on a visit to Everett's home, where the statue was draped to cover its near-nakedness, a few years before the donation, the covering as an example of the prudishness of otherwise educated and open-minded Americans.

The Apollo remains a part of the architecture of the Ether Dome as a testament to medicine due to its symbolism. Upon further observing the cast statue, one may notice the snake directly next to Apollo. Snakes are a symbol of renewal and are even displayed in the caduceus—a prominent emblem of healing. Furthermore, the statue is an indicator to visitors that this room represents innovation and the advancement of medicine.

The Hippocrates of Ancient Greek scholars worshipped Apollo, and this inevitably led to teachings that would act as a precedent to modern-day medical personnel. Apollo—the god of medicine and healing—was sacred in the original Hippocratic Oath: "I swear by Apollo the Healer, by Asclepius, by Hygieia, by Panacea, and by all the gods and goddesses, making them my witnesses, that I will carry out, according to my ability and judgment, this oath and this indenture."

==== Skeleton ====
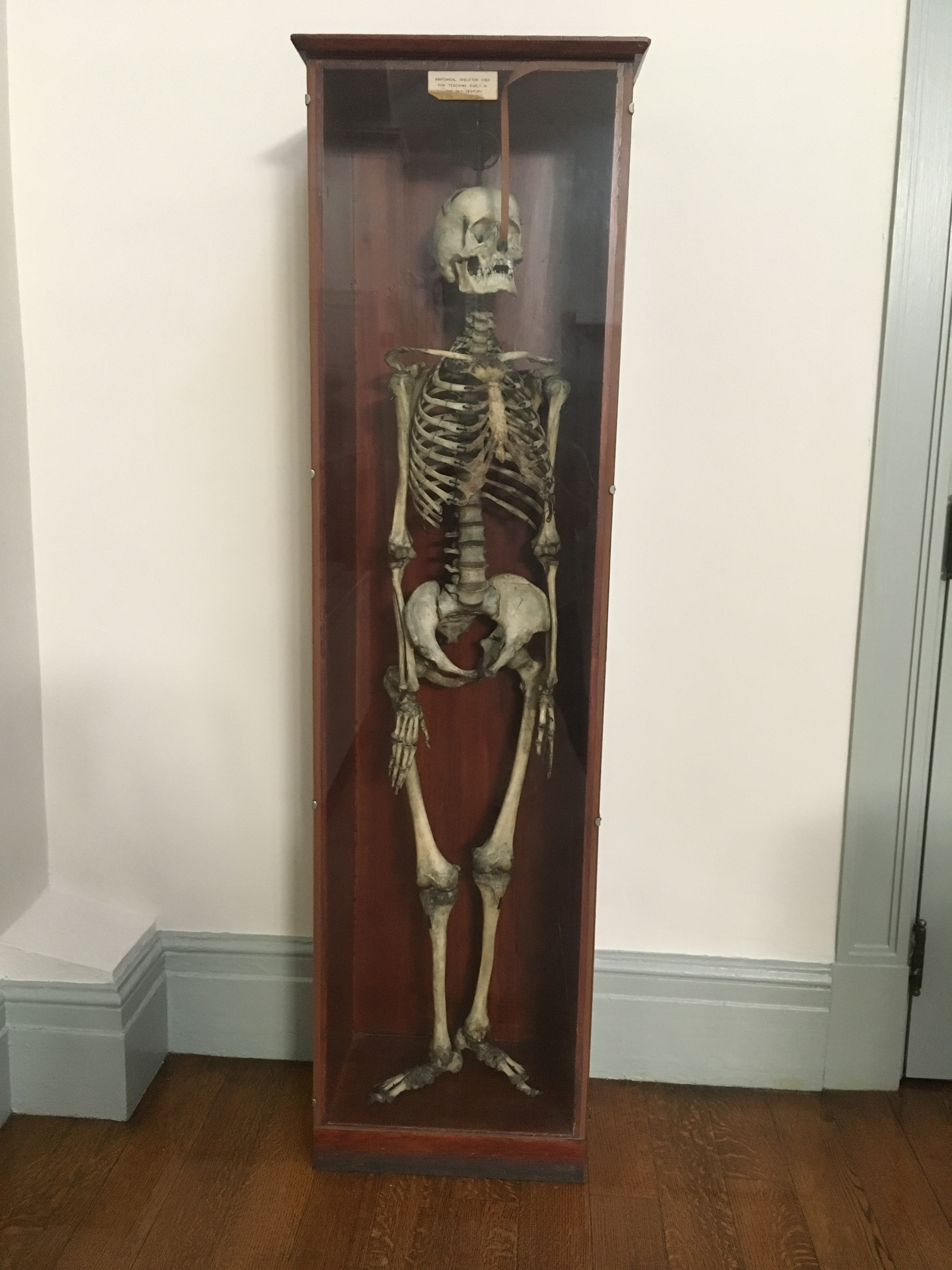
The Ether Dome's skeleton. Such skeletons were essential tools of 19th-century medical education.

The teaching skeleton hanging in the Ether Dome can be seen in the background of daguerreotypes showing the administration of ether anesthesia in 1847. Such skeletons were a common feature in hospitals and medical schools in the 19th century. While the identity of this skeleton is not known, it is possible that it was obtained through the practice of body snatching, a practice prevalent in the 19th century due to a shortage of available bodies for instruction in medical schools. As medical dissection was illegal in many parts of the United States, students often had to rely on the illicit activities of body snatchers, or resort to grave robbing themselves. In 1831, Massachusetts passed the Anatomy Act, allowing the state's medical schools to obtain the bodies of the poor, the insane, and those who died in prison. The aim of this act was to decrease the illicit activities of the body snatchers, though it further contributed to the sense of separation between the well-to-do, who could be buried in respectable cemeteries, and the poor, who were at risk of having their bodies used against their wills after death.

=== Ether Dome sublevel exhibit ===
Located through small doors on either side of the Ether Dome theater or through a closed door at the bottom of a steep, downwards stairway behind the top row of the theater, there is an exhibit of various Ether Day artifacts and information, including quotes from the Ether Day event. In the round room under the seats of the Ether Dome theater, the exhibit is designated as the "G. H. Gay Ward, Memorial of George Henry Gay" by a shiny, gold plaque. On the walls there are drawings and paintings of notable figures, such as Dr. William T. G. Morton, and pictures of quotes, like "We have conquered pain." Alongside the exhibited pictures and quotes, there are artifacts like an operating chair and the wedding clothes of William T. G. Morton, which represent an evidence of wealth and a veneration of ether. The hidden crescent-shaped corridor is a significant part of the Ether Dome exhibit that rarely gets the same attention. With a normal diabetes office inside of the small doors, it is easy to see how the Ether Dome's second half can be mistaken for a locked room or closet behind the Ether Dome.

== Gallery ==
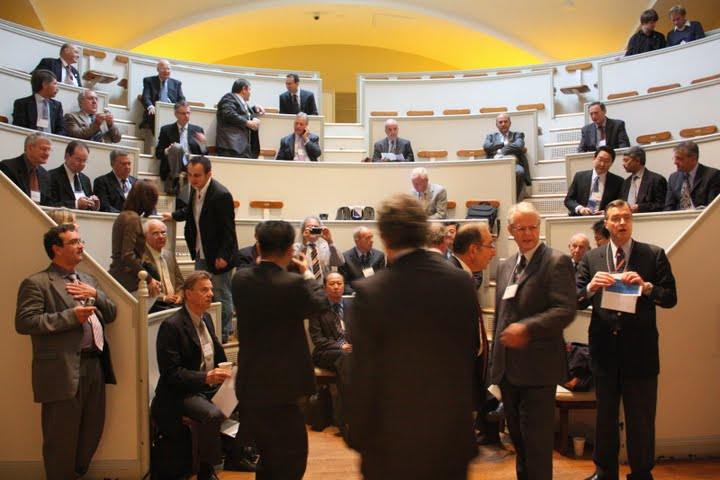
Seating area

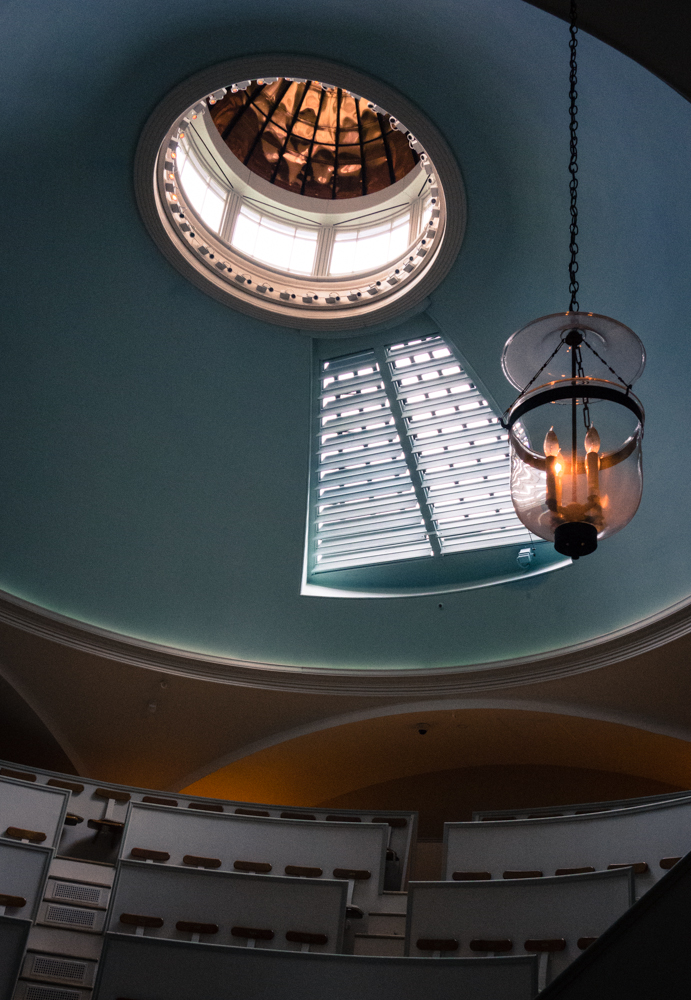
Inside the Ether Dome

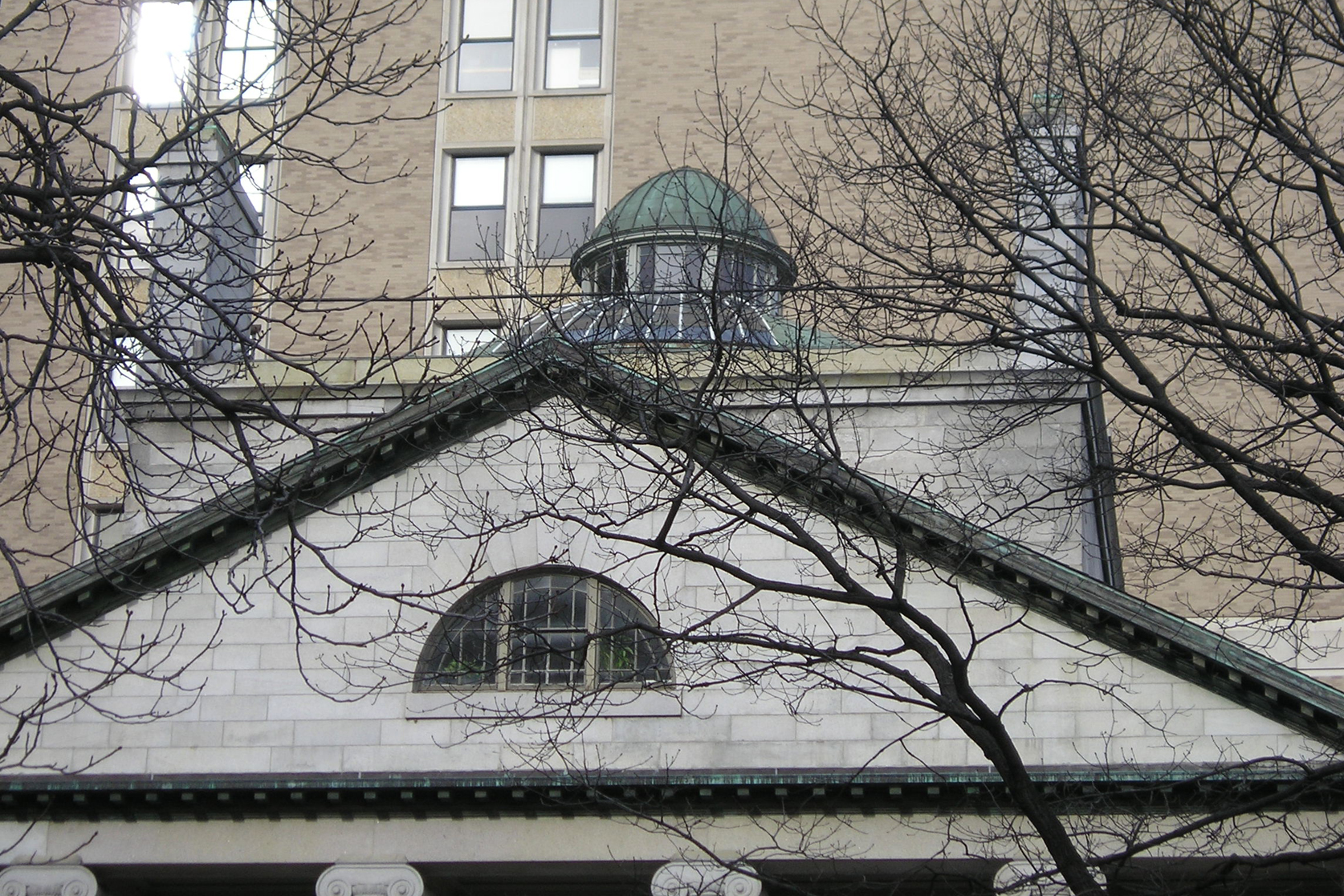
Outside view as photographed from the grounds

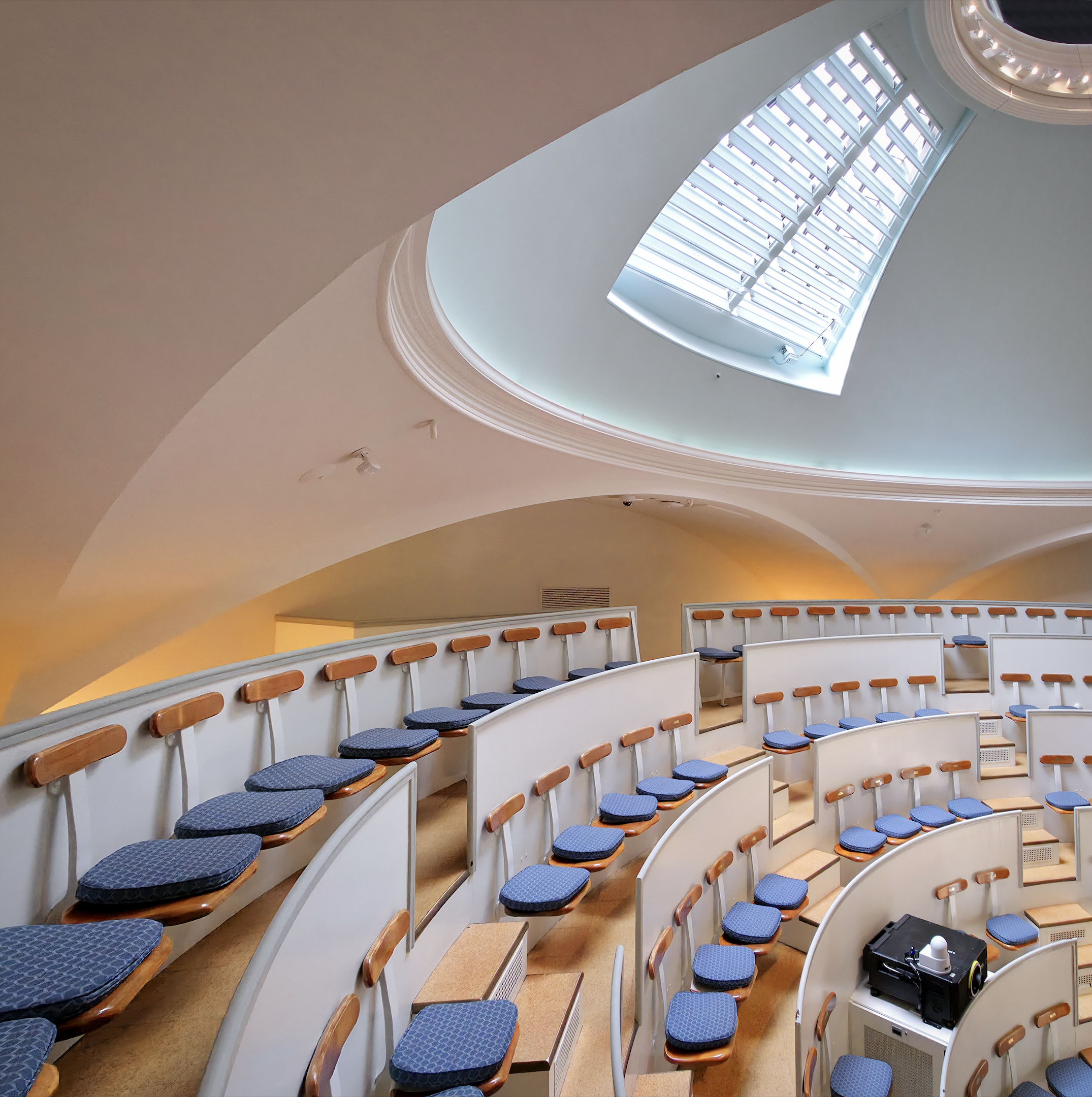

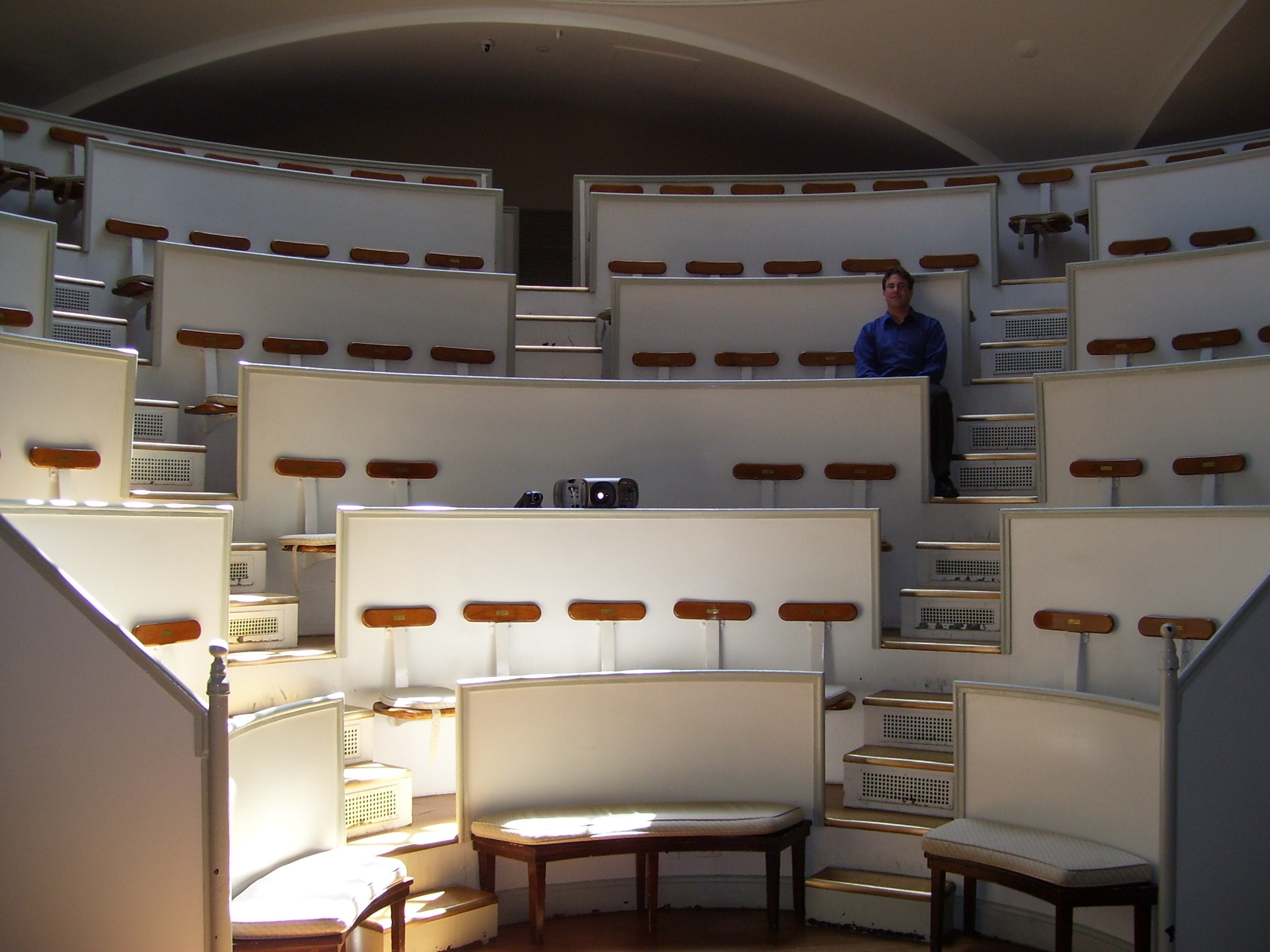
Operating theater and seating

== See also ==
- Diethyl Ether (Anesthetic Use)
- Ether Monument
- List of National Historic Landmarks in Boston
- National Register of Historic Places listings in northern Boston, Massachusetts
