= Robert Cutler Hinckley =

American portraitist

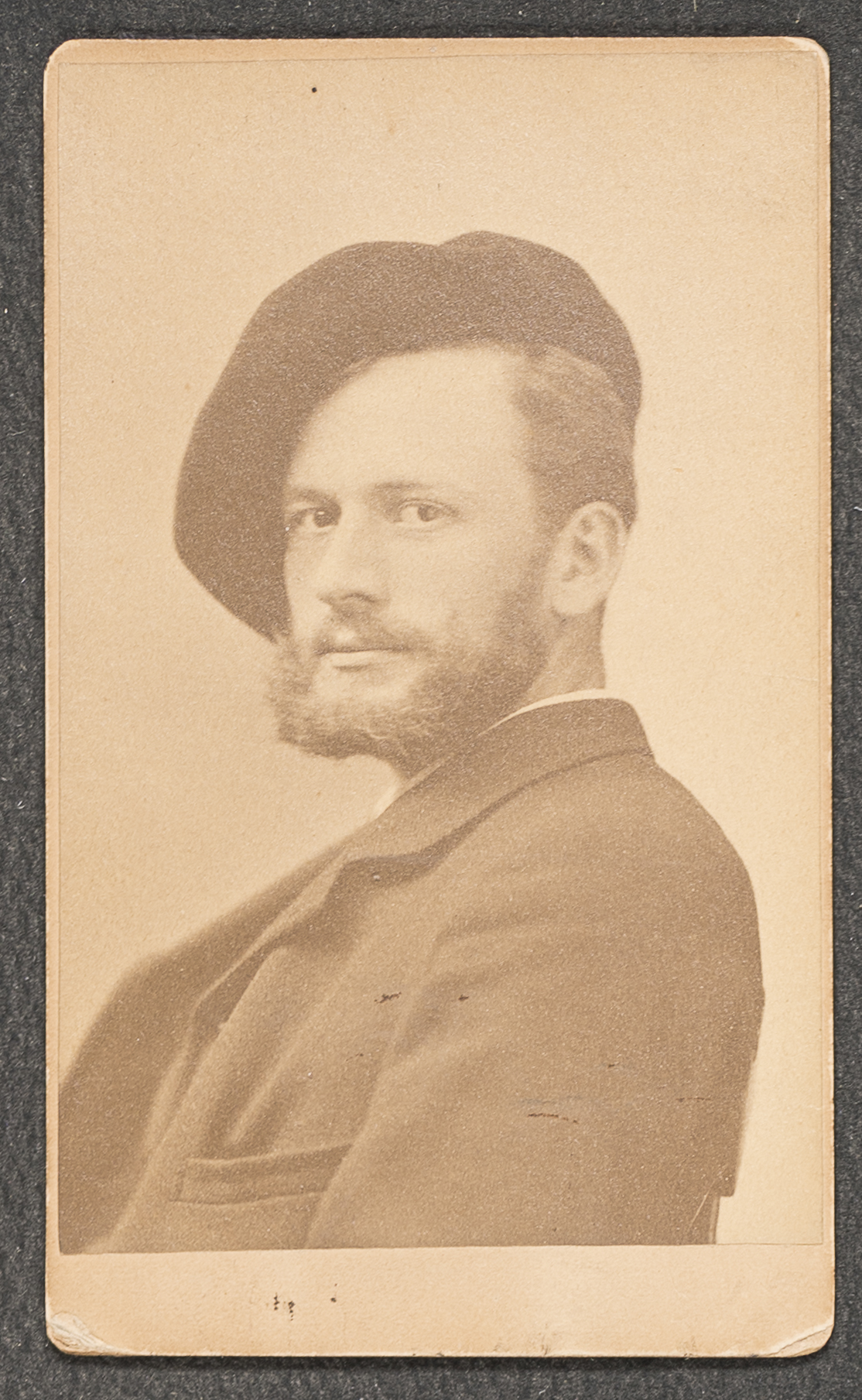
Photographic portrait of Robert Cutler Hinckley, c. 1885

Robert Cutler Hinckley (April 3, 1853 – June 2, 1941) was an American portraitist known for portraits of eminent Americans and his painting, The First Operation with Ether.

== Early life ==
Hinckley was born in Northampton, Massachusetts on April 3, 1853. He was the son of Samuel Lyman Hinckley (Note: His father was born Samuel Hinckley Lyman, but changed his name as per the request of his maternal grandfather, Judge Samuel Hinckley, for whom Hinckley, Ohio was named.) and Anne Cutler (née Parker) Hinckley (1813–1898). His paternal grandparents were Jonathan Huntington Lyman and Sophia (née Hinckley) Lyman. His maternal grandparents were Samuel Dunn Parker and Elizabeth (née Mason) Parker, the daughter of U.S. Senator Jonathan Mason. His aunt, Sally Outram Lyman, was married to agricultural writer Richard Lamb Allen.

== Career ==
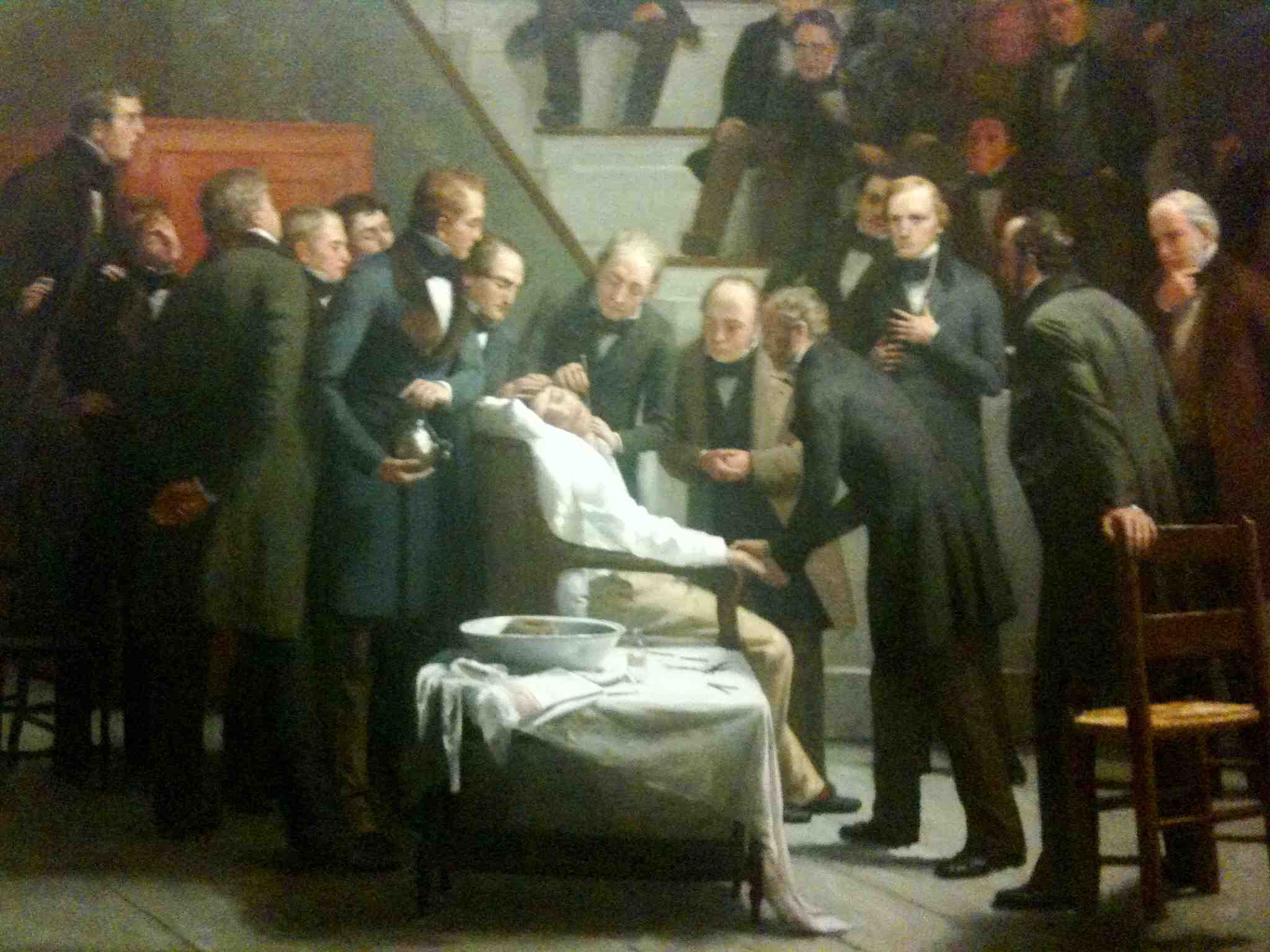
Ether Day, or The First Operation Under Ether by Hinckley.

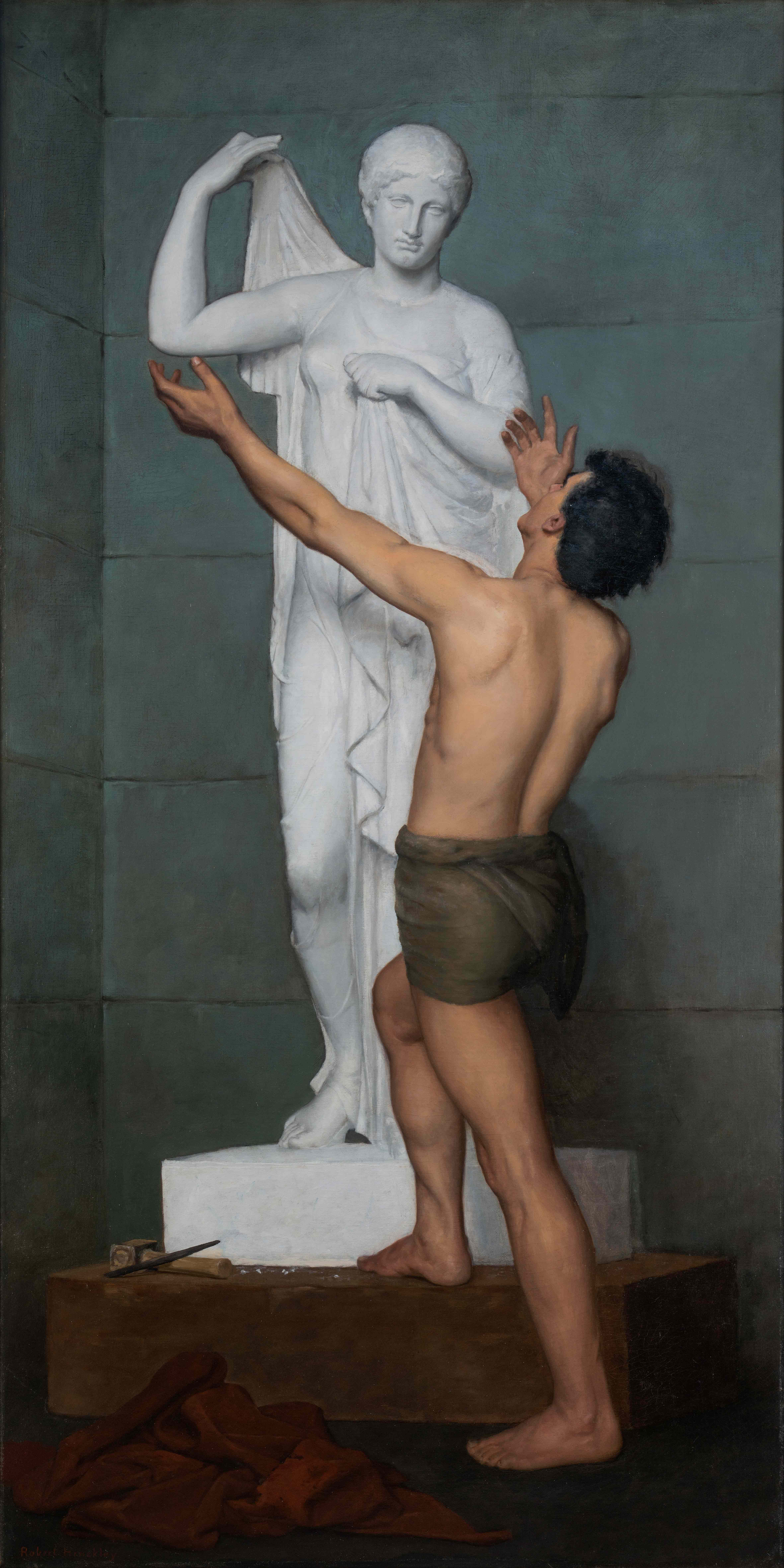
Pygmalion and Galatea

As a teen, he was taken by his parents to Paris for formal training in art, graduating from the École des Beaux-Arts. In his twenty years there, he trained from 1864 to 1884 under master portraitist Charles Auguste Emile Durand, alongside John Singer Sargent.

Of his more than 350 paintings, his most famous is The First Operation with Ether. Begun in Paris in 1882, it depicts the first successful public demonstration of ether anesthesia; it is now on display at UMass Chan Medical School's Lamar Soutter library.

He was also known for his mammoth historical painting, Alexander at Persepolis, completed at the Salon of 1882. His work was described thusly:

Mr. Hinckley has creditably achieved what neither our American artists nor authors seem very fond of attempting--a carefully sustained and elaborate historical study. The varying emotions which Alexander's purpose calls out are strongly depicted in the faces and attitudes of those present as guests and spectators. The approval of the dissolute old Roman reclining with his paramour on the right, is strikingly expressive of a general fondness for cruelty and rapine, while there is the animus of a personal hatred in the elan with which Thais raises her threatening torch on high The figure of Alexander is well-poised and his attitude highly dramatic, but I like best the expressive face and eloquent action of the woman in the central foreground. Admiration, affright and jealousy are marvelously mingled The picture was shown in last year's Salon and in the National Academy Exhibition this season"

=== Washington studio ===
In 1884, after returning from Europe, Hinckley established a studio in Washington, D.C. where he was known for portraits of eminent Americans. In addition to his portraits, he also taught a portrait class at the Corcoran School of the Arts and Design for six years.

He painted many portraits of American society figures, including President Ulysses S. Grant, and John Alsop King, the president of the New-York Historical Society. 88 of his portraits were on display at West Point Military Academy.

His painting of Pygmalion and Galatea was exhibited at the Paris Salon of 1880 (Cat. Nr. 1853), Collection Berko Fine Paintings - Belgium.

== Personal life ==
In 1885, Hinckley was married to Eleanor O'Donnell, who predeceased him. They lived in Washington at 1623 16th St NW in a home designed Fuller and Wheeler of Albany in 1886, and were the parents of a son and daughter, Robert O'Donnell Hinckley and Gladys Hinckley (1891–1976), who married McCeney Werlich, the European representative of American Locomotive Company.

Hinckley's sister, Susan Hinckley Bradley, was also a well-known painter.

Hinckley died at his residence in Rehoboth Beach, Delaware on June 2, 1941.
