= Robert Tanner Freeman =

American dentist (1846–1873)

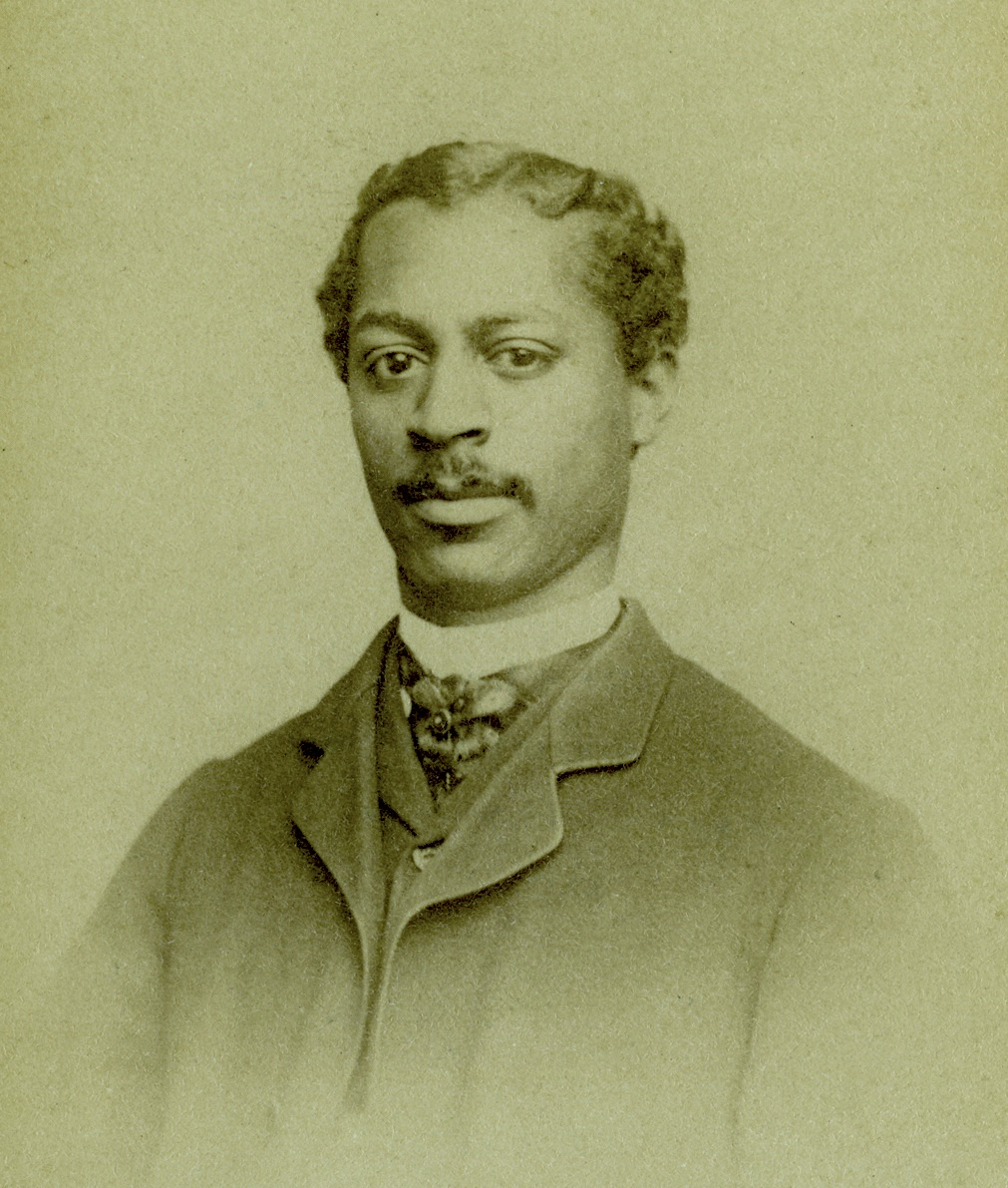
- Born: c. 1846; Washington, D.C., U.S.
- Died: June 10, 1873 (aged 26–27); Washington, D.C.
- Education: Harvard School of Dental Medicine (DMD 1869)
- Occupation: Dentist
- Known for: First African American dentist

Robert Tanner Freeman (c. 1846–1873) was an American dentist. As one of the first six students to attend the Harvard School of Dental Medicine, he became the first African American to graduate with a dental degree in the United States on March 10, 1869. He subsequently practiced dentistry in Washington, D.C.

== Early life and education ==
Freeman was born near Washington, D.C., in about 1846. He was the son of a carpenter who had bought his family's freedom and then moved to Raleigh, North Carolina. During his late teens, Freeman worked for a mentor, Dr. Henry Bliss Noble, a white dentist in Washington.

Before Freeman was accepted into the Harvard Dental School, now the Harvard School of Dental Medicine, he was rejected by two other institutions because of the color of his skin. The dental school's first dean, Nathan Cooley Keep, interviewed him and invited him to become one of the first six students to attend Harvard Dental School. On March 10, 1869, Freeman became the first African American to graduate from that school, also becoming the first African American awarded a dental degree in the United States.

== Career ==
After receiving his DMD (Doctor of Medicine in Dentistry) degree, Freeman returned to Washington, D.C., to launch a dental practice, establishing himself in the same building as his mentor, Dr. Noble. Fours years removed from graduating and practicing professionally, Freeman contracted an unspecified water-borne disease that resulted in his untimely death on June 10, 1873.

== Legacy ==
The Washington Society of Colored Dentists, established in 1900, renamed itself in 1909 the Robert Tanner Freeman Dental Society in honor of America's first African American dentist. Freeman was the grandfather of Robert C. Weaver, the first African American to serve in the U.S. Cabinet, serving under President Lyndon B. Johnson as Secretary of Housing & Urban Development.
