= Massachusetts General Hospital, Bulfinch Building =

Building in Boston, Massachusetts

- Massachusetts General Hospital
- U.S. National Register of Historic Places
- U.S. National Historic Landmark
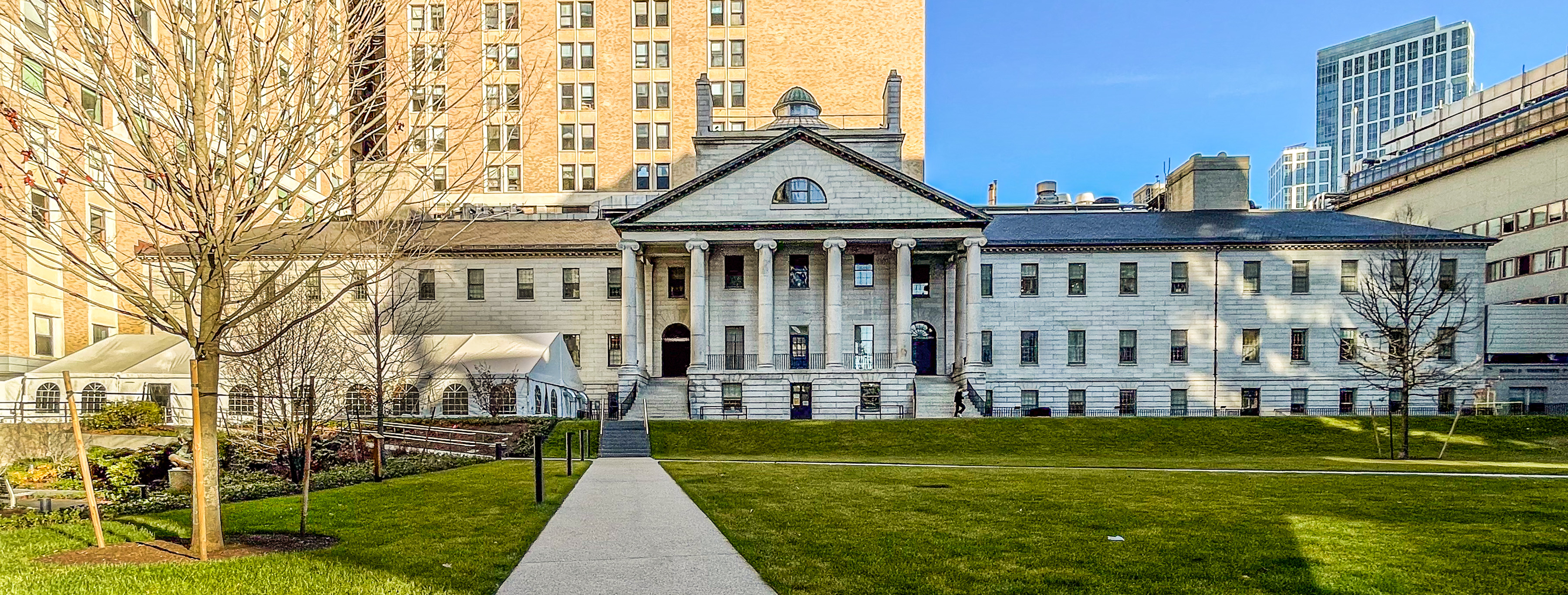

- Location within Boston Location within Massachusetts Location within the United States
- Interactive map of Massachusetts General Hospital
- Location: Fruit Street, Boston, Massachusetts
- Coordinates: 42°21′48″N 71°4′8″W
- Area: 4 acres (1.6 ha)
- Built: 1818
- Built by: Alexander Parris
- Architect: Charles Bulfinch
- Architectural style: Classical Revival
- NRHP reference No.: 70000682

Significant dates
- Added to NRHP: December 30, 1970
- Designated NHL: December 30, 1970

The Bulfinch Building of the Massachusetts General Hospital is located on the hospital's main campus on Fruit Street in the West End of Boston, Massachusetts. It was designed by architect Charles Bulfinch, and built between 1818 and 1823, with a major expansion in 1844-46. A National Historic Landmark, it is an excellent example of Classical Revival architecture, and a rare surviving example of an early 19th-century public hospital building. The building is home to the Ether Dome, an operating theater which has been separately designated a National Historic Landmark as the site of the first public demonstration of the use of ether as an anesthetic.

== Description and history ==
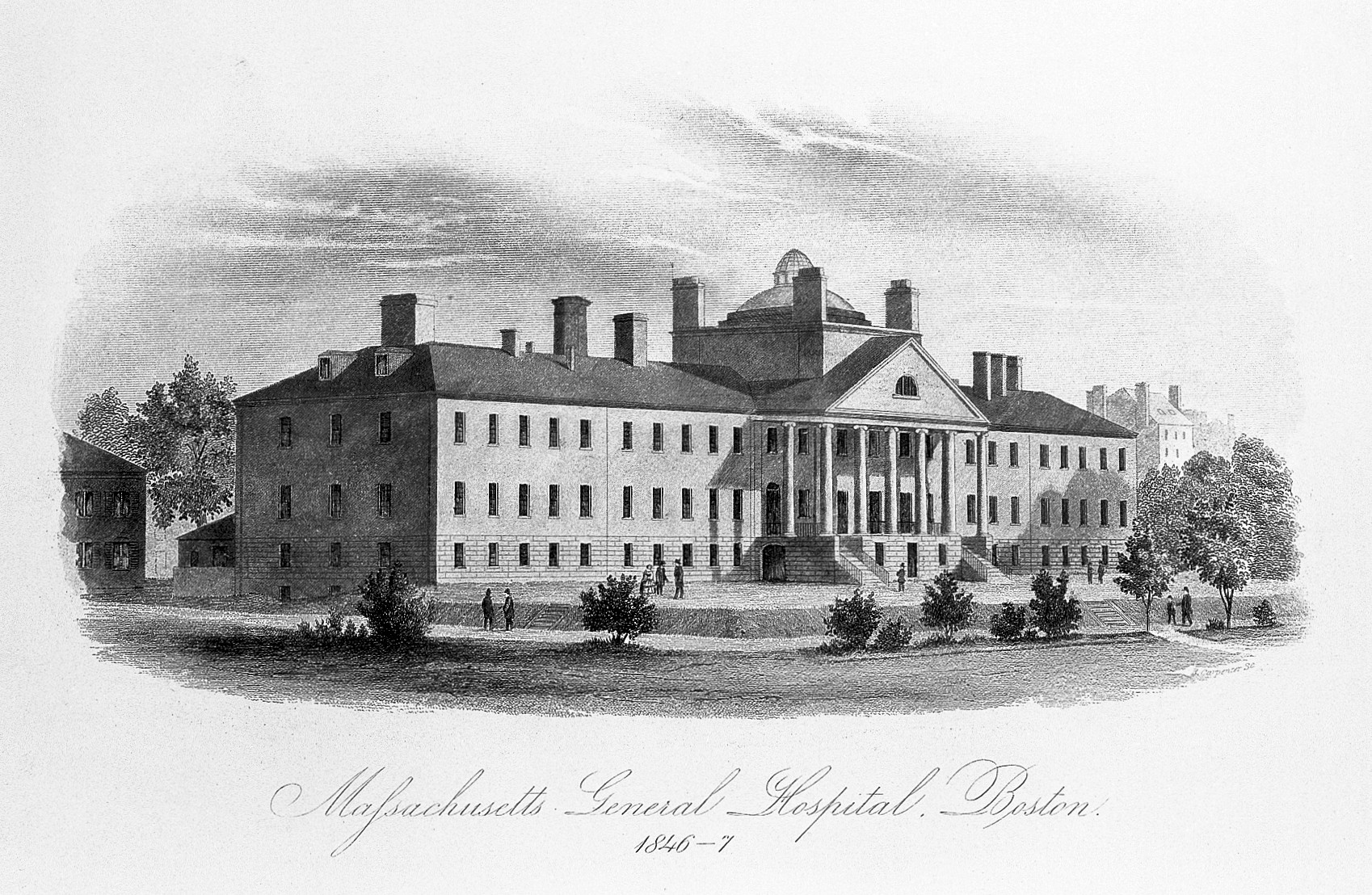
1846 view

The Bulfinch Building is a rectangular structure, two stories in height, with a massive Ionic portico at the center of its longer facade. The building is built out of white granite from Chelmsford, Massachusetts, and stands on a basement of rusticated granite. It has a hipped roof, and the central portion has a square attic story with chimneys at the corners and a saucer-shaped dome in the center. The interior has undergone extensive and repeated renovations, as the hospital's needs for the space have changed.

As designed by Charles Bulfinch in 1817 and built over the next five years by Alexander Parris, the building had smaller wings (roughly half the present size), and had a capacity of 73 beds. The stonework for its construction was largely done by the inmates at the Charlestown Prison. The building's capacity was nearly doubled in 1844-46 by the addition of five bays to each of the wings, and the original entrance hall designed by Bulfinch was extensively altered.

Bulfinch's design, with an operating amphitheater under the dome, was probably based on that in the Pennsylvania Hospital building, which he probably saw on a visit in 1816. That amphitheater, now known as the Ether Dome, is where the first public demonstration of the use of ether as an anesthetic took place on October 16, 1846. The amphitheater was designated a National Historic Landmark in 1965 in recognition of this event. The entire building was listed on the National Register of Historic Places, and designated a National Historic Landmark, in 1970, as an excellent example of Classical Revival architecture, and as one of the oldest public hospital buildings in the nation.

Over the years, the building has become surrounded by the much larger modern facilities of the hospital.

== See also ==
- List of National Historic Landmarks in Boston
- National Register of Historic Places listings in northern Boston, Massachusetts
