= William T. G. Morton =

American dentist and physician (1819–1868)

William Thomas Green Morton
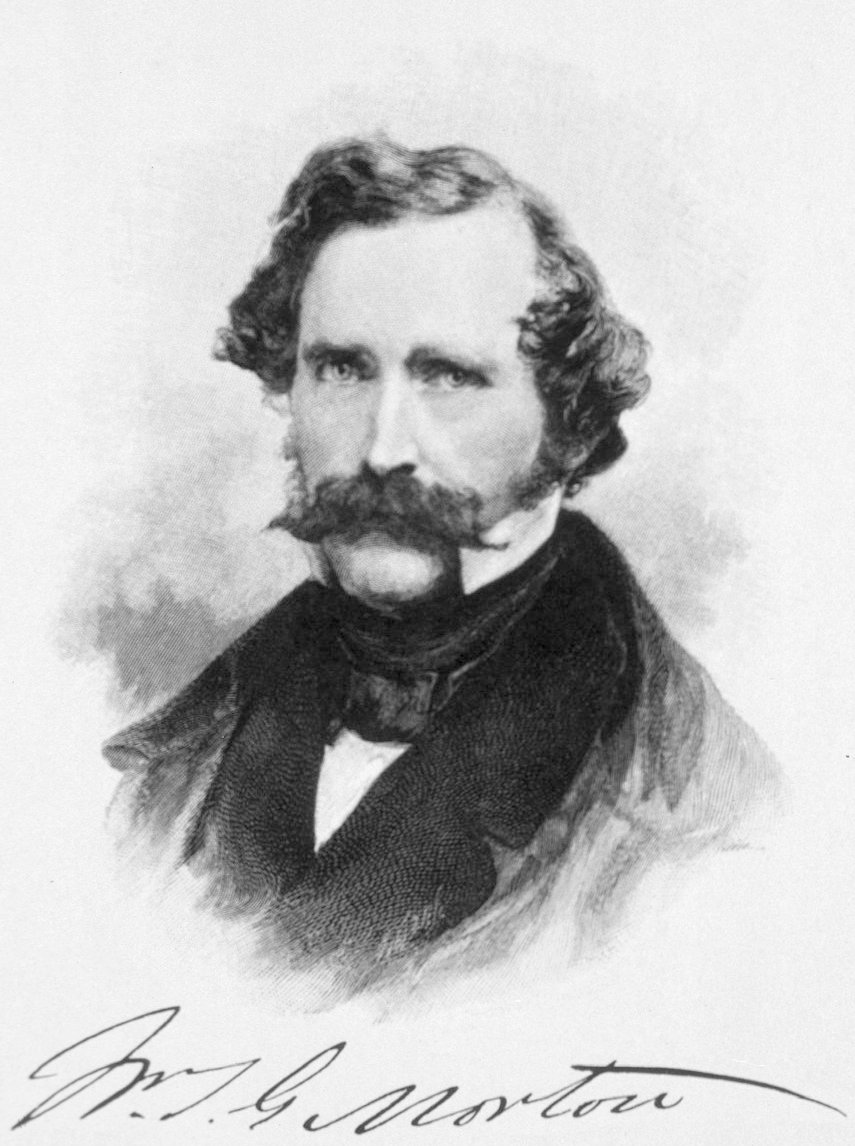
- Born: August 9, 1819; Charlton, Massachusetts
- Died: July 15, 1868 (aged 48); New York City, New York
- Known for: First use of ether in surgical operations
- Spouse: Elizabeth Whiteman
- Scientific career
- Fields: Dentistry

William Thomas Green Morton (August 9, 1819 – July 15, 1868) was an American dentist who first publicly demonstrated the use of inhaled ether as a surgical anesthetic in 1846. He is credited with gaining the medical world’s acceptance of surgical anesthesia.

== Early life ==
Born in Charlton, Massachusetts, William T. G. Morton was the son of James Morton, a miner, and Rebecca (Needham) Morton. William found work as a clerk, printer, and salesman in Boston before entering Baltimore College of Dental Surgery in 1840. In 1841, he gained notoriety for developing a new process to solder false teeth onto gold plates. In 1842, he left college after graduating to study in Hartford, Connecticut with dentist Horace Wells and Dr. Nathan Cooley Keep. In 1843, Morton married Elizabeth Whitman of Farmington, Connecticut, the niece of former Congressman Lemuel Whitman. Her parents objected to Morton's profession and agreed to the marriage only after he promised to study medicine. In the autumn of 1844, Morton entered Harvard Medical School and attended the lectures of Charles T. Jackson, who introduced Morton to the anesthetic properties of ether. Morton then left Harvard without graduating.

== Career ==
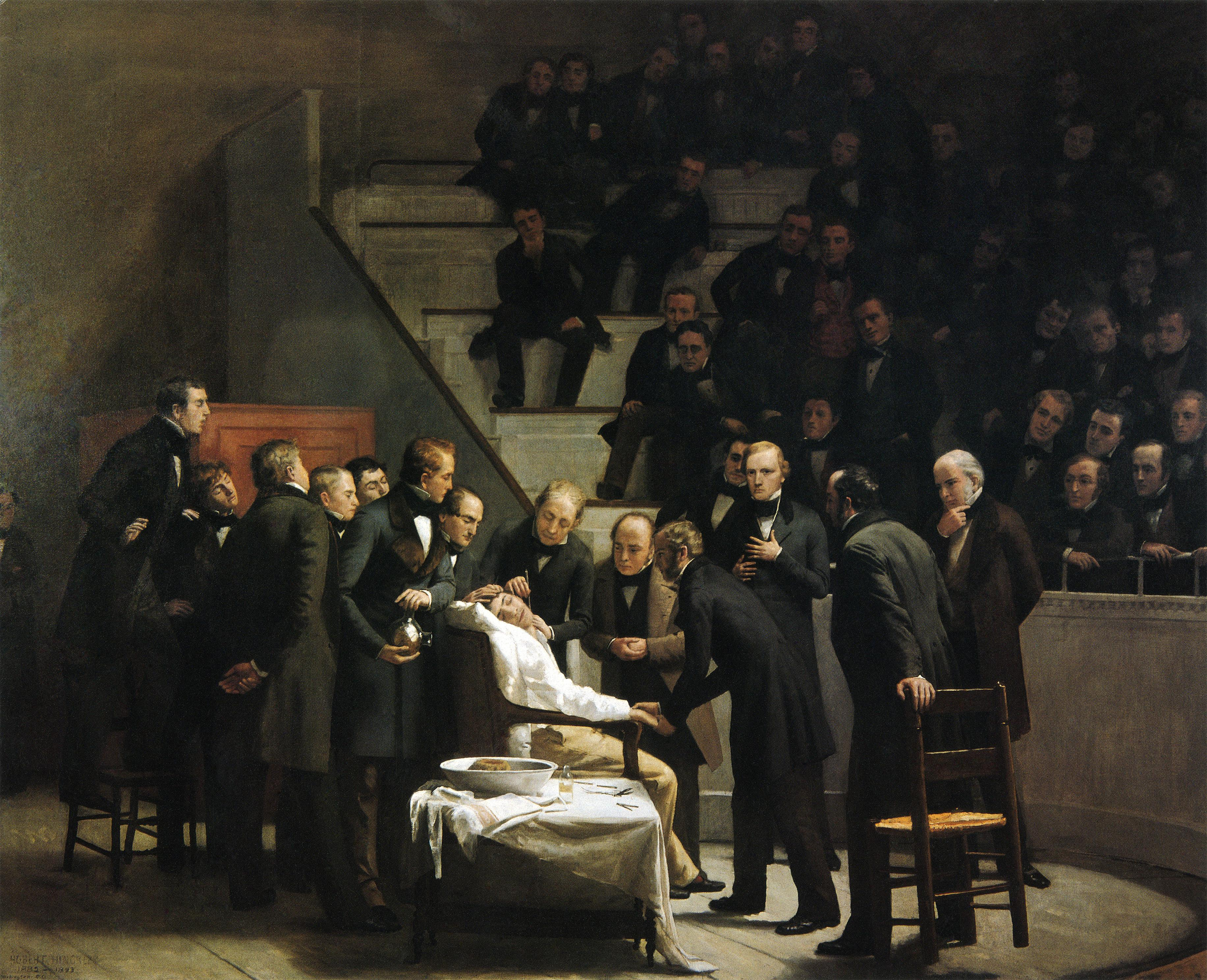
Painting by Robert C. Hinckley, "The First Operation Under Ether" depicting the public demonstration of October 16, 1846.

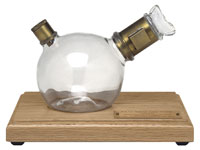
Replica of the inhaler used by William T. G. Morton in 1846 in the first public demonstration of surgery using ether.

On September 30, 1846, Morton performed a painless tooth extraction after administering ether to Ebenezer Hopkins Frost (1824–1866). Upon reading a favorable newspaper account of this event, Boston surgeon Henry Jacob Bigelow arranged for a now-famous demonstration of ether on October 16, 1846, at the operating theatre of the Massachusetts General Hospital, or MGH. At this demonstration John Collins Warren painlessly removed a tumour from the neck of a Mr. Edward Gilbert Abbott. News of this use of ether spread rapidly around the world, and the first recorded use of ether outside the USA was in London, England, by the dentist James Robinson in a tooth extraction at the home of Francis Boote, an American doctor who had heard of Morton's and Bigelow's demonstrations. The MGH theatre came to be known as the Ether Dome and has been preserved as a monument to this historic event. Following the demonstration, Morton tried to hide the identity of the substance Abbott had inhaled, by referring to it as "Letheon", but it soon was found to be ether.

A month after this demonstration, a patent was issued for "letheon", although it was widely known by then that the inhalant was ether. The medical community at large condemned the patent as unjust and illiberal in such a humane and scientific profession. Morton assured his colleagues that he would not restrict the use of ether among hospitals and charitable institutions, alleging that his motives for seeking a patent were to ensure the competent administration of ether and to prevent its misuse or abuse, as well as to recoup the expenditures of its development. Morton's pursuit of credit for and profit from the administration of ether was complicated by the furtive and sometimes deceptive tactics he employed during its development, as well as the competing claims of other doctors, most notably his former business partner, Horace Wells. Just after working with him for a mere three weeks, Wells felt Morton could not be tolerated and ended the partnership. Morton's own efforts to obtain patents overseas also undermined his assertions of philanthropic intent. Consequently, no effort was made to enforce the patent, and ether soon came into general use.

In December 1846, Morton applied to Congress for "national recompense" of $100,000, but this too was complicated by the claims of Jackson and Wells as discoverers of ether, and so Morton's application proved fruitless. Horace Wells even addressed a letter to the editor of the Hartford Daily Courant, outlining his experiments and experience with anesthesia. Wells stated that he had met with Morton and Jackson in Boston “both of whom admitted it to be entirely new to them. Dr Jackson expressed much surprise that severe operations could be performed without pain, and these are the individuals who claim to be the inventors.” Wells’ letter also states he had preferred nitrous oxide over sulfuric ether for his experiments as being a potentially less harmful substance. After these people claimed to be the inventors of anesthesia, Morton made more applications in 1849, 1851, and 1853, and all failed. Morton later sought remuneration for his achievement through a futile attempt to sue the United States government. The lawyer who represented him was Richard Henry Dana Jr.

Morton's notoriety only increased when he served as the star defense witness in one of the most notable trials of the nineteenth century, that of John White Webster, who had been accused of the murder of George Parkman. Morton's rival, Dr Jackson, testified for the prosecution, and the residents of Boston were anxious to witness these nemeses in courtroom combat. His former tutor Dr. Nathan Cooley Keep, who had made the artificial teeth Parkman used, and identified it in the found remain, claimed the body was the victim's. Morton initially denied Keep's claim, but later changed his mind and agreed to Keep's observation.

In 1852, he received an honorary degree from the Washington University of Medicine in Baltimore, which later became the College of Physicians and Surgeons.

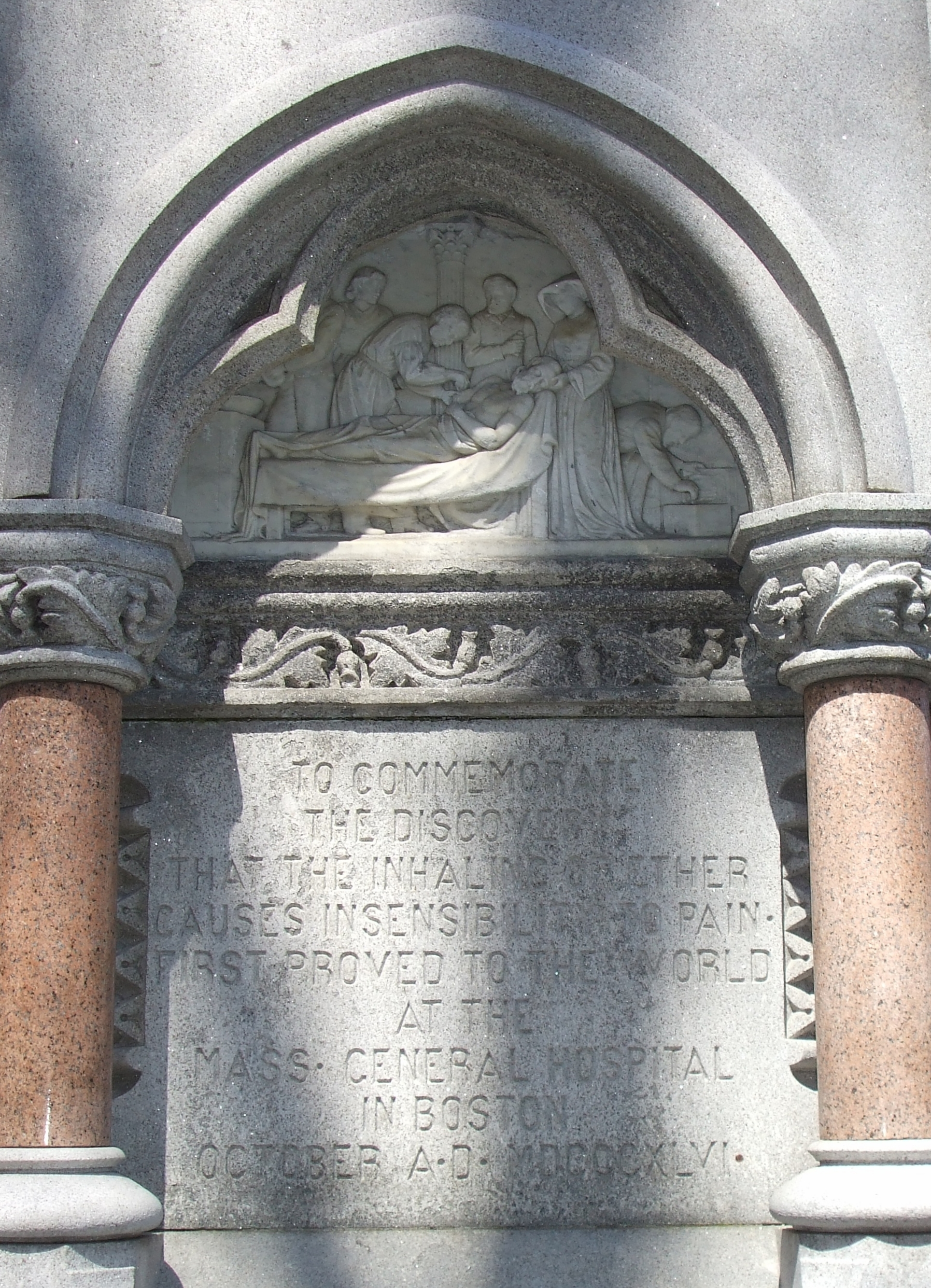
Panel from monument in Boston commemorating Morton's demonstration of the anesthetic use of ether.

In the spring of 1857, Amos A. Lawrence, a wealthy Bostonian, together with the medical professionals and influential citizens of Boston, developed a plan to raise $100,000 as a national testimonial to Morton, receiving contributions from both public and private citizens.

Morton performed public service yet again in the autumn of 1862 when he joined the Army of the Potomac as a volunteer surgeon, and applied ether to more than two thousand wounded soldiers during the battles of Fredericksburg, Chancellorsville, and the Wilderness.

== Death ==
Morton was in New York City in July 1868. He was riding in a carriage with his wife when he suddenly demanded the carriage to stop, and he ran into the lake in Central Park "to cool off". This peculiar behavior was because he had suffered a major stroke (cerebrovascular incident) which proved fatal soon after.

Morton was taken to nearby St. Luke's. It is reported by his wife that upon recognizing Morton, the chief surgeon made the following remark to his students:

Young gentlemen, you see lying before you a man who has done more for humanity and for the relief of suffering than any man who has ever lived.

She then produced three medals, saying that the medals were all he had ever received for his work.

He is buried at Mount Auburn Cemetery in Watertown and Cambridge, Massachusetts.

== Legacy ==
Before whom, In all time, Surgery was Agony

By whom, pain in surgery was averted

Since whom, science has control over pain

— Morton's tombstone

In 1871, a committee of those involved in raising the aforementioned national testimonial published The Historical Memoranda Relative to the Discovery of Etherization to establish Morton as the inventor and revealer of anesthetic inhalation and to justify pecuniary reward to Morton's family for the "fearful moral and legal responsibility he assumed in pursuit of this discovery."

Morton's life and work were later to become the subject of the 1944 Paramount Pictures film The Great Moment. It was dramatised in the Australian radio play Dishonour Be My Destiny.

The first use of ether as an anesthetic is commemorated in the Ether Monument in the Boston Public Garden, but the designers were careful not to choose sides in the debate over the person who deserved credit for the discovery. Instead, the statue depicts a doctor in medieval Moorish robes and turban.

Morton's first successful public demonstration of ether as an inhalation anesthetic was such a historic and widely publicised event that many consider him to be the "inventor and revealer" of anesthesia. However, Morton's work was preceded by that of Georgia surgeon Crawford Williamson Long, who employed ether as an anesthetic on March 30, 1842. Although Long demonstrated its use to physicians in Georgia on numerous occasions, he did not publish his findings until 1849, in The Southern Medical and Surgical Journal. These pioneering uses of ether were key factors in the medical and scientific pursuit now referred to as anesthesiology, and allowed the development of modern surgery. Spread of the news of this "new" anesthetic was helped by the subsequent feud that developed between Morton and Horace Wells and Charles T. Jackson.

His son William J. Morton was a noted doctor and authority in electrotherapeutics.

== Personal life ==
He had five children with his wife: William James Morton (1845–1920), Marion Alethe Morton (1847–unknown, after 1865), Edward Whitman Morton (1848–unknown, after 1870), Elizabeth Whitman Morton (1850–1922), Bowditch Nathaniel Morton (1857–1909).
