= Edward Gilbert Abbott =

Patient upon whom ether was demonstrated

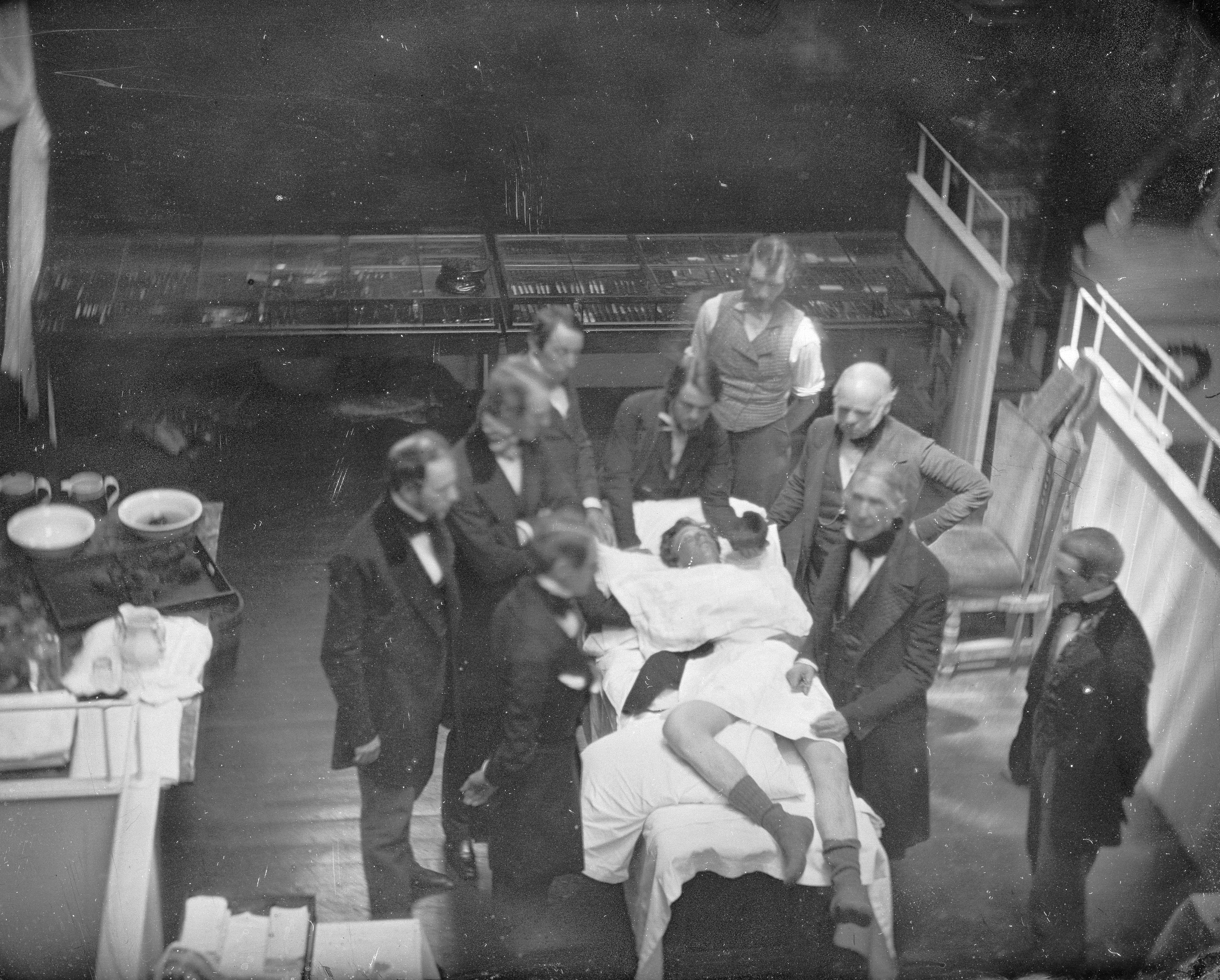
Daguerreotype by Southworth & Hawes of a historic ether operation at Mass. General Hospital, July 3, 1847. The MGH Department of Anesthesia, Critical Care and Pain Medicine traces its roots back to the October 16, 1846 public demonstration of medical ether.

Edward Gilbert Abbott (1825–1855) was the patient upon whom William T. G. Morton first publicly demonstrated the use of ether as a surgical anesthetic. The operation was done in an amphitheater at the Massachusetts General Hospital now known as the Ether Dome on 16 October 1846. After Morton administered the ether, surgeon John Collins Warren removed a portion of a tumor from Abbott's neck. After Warren had finished, and Abbott regained consciousness, Warren asked the patient how he felt. Reportedly, Abbott said, "Feels as if my neck's been scratched." Warren then turned to his medical audience and uttered "Gentlemen, this is no Humbug." This was presumably a reference to the unsuccessful demonstration of nitrous oxide anesthesia by Horace Wells in the previous year, which was ended by cries of "Humbug!" after the patient groaned with pain. But the origin of the phrase is questionable, and Warren stated that he did not remember Wells's demonstration until it was brought up by Wells himself in 1847.
