= Electrotherapeutics =

Electrotherapeutics is a general term for the use of electricity in therapeutics, i.e. in the alleviation and cure of disease. It is used as a treatment, like electroconvulsive therapy and TENS.

In the technical working of medical electrolysis the most minute precautions are required. The solution of the drug must be made with as pure water as possible, recently distilled. The spongy substance forming the electrode must be free from any trace of electrolytic substances. Hence all materials used must be washed in distilled water. Absorbent cotton answers all requirements and is easily procured. The area of introduction can be exactly circumscribed by cutting a hole in a sheet of adhesive plaster which is applied to the skin and on which the electrolytic electrodes are pressed. The great advantage of electrolytic methods is that it enables general treatment to be replaced by a strictly local treatment, and the cells can be saturated exactly to the degree and depth required.

Strong antiseptics and materials that coagulate albumen cannot be introduced locally by ordinary methods, as the skin is impermeable to them, but by electrolysis they can be introduced to the exact depth required. The local effects of the ions depend on the dosage; thus a feeble dose of the ions of zinc stimulates the growth of hair, but a stronger dose produces the death of the tissue. Naturally the different ions produce different effects.

Electrolysis can also be used for extracting from the body such ions as are injurious, as uric and oxalic acid from a patient suffering from gout.
