= Nathan Cooley Keep =

American dentistry pioneer

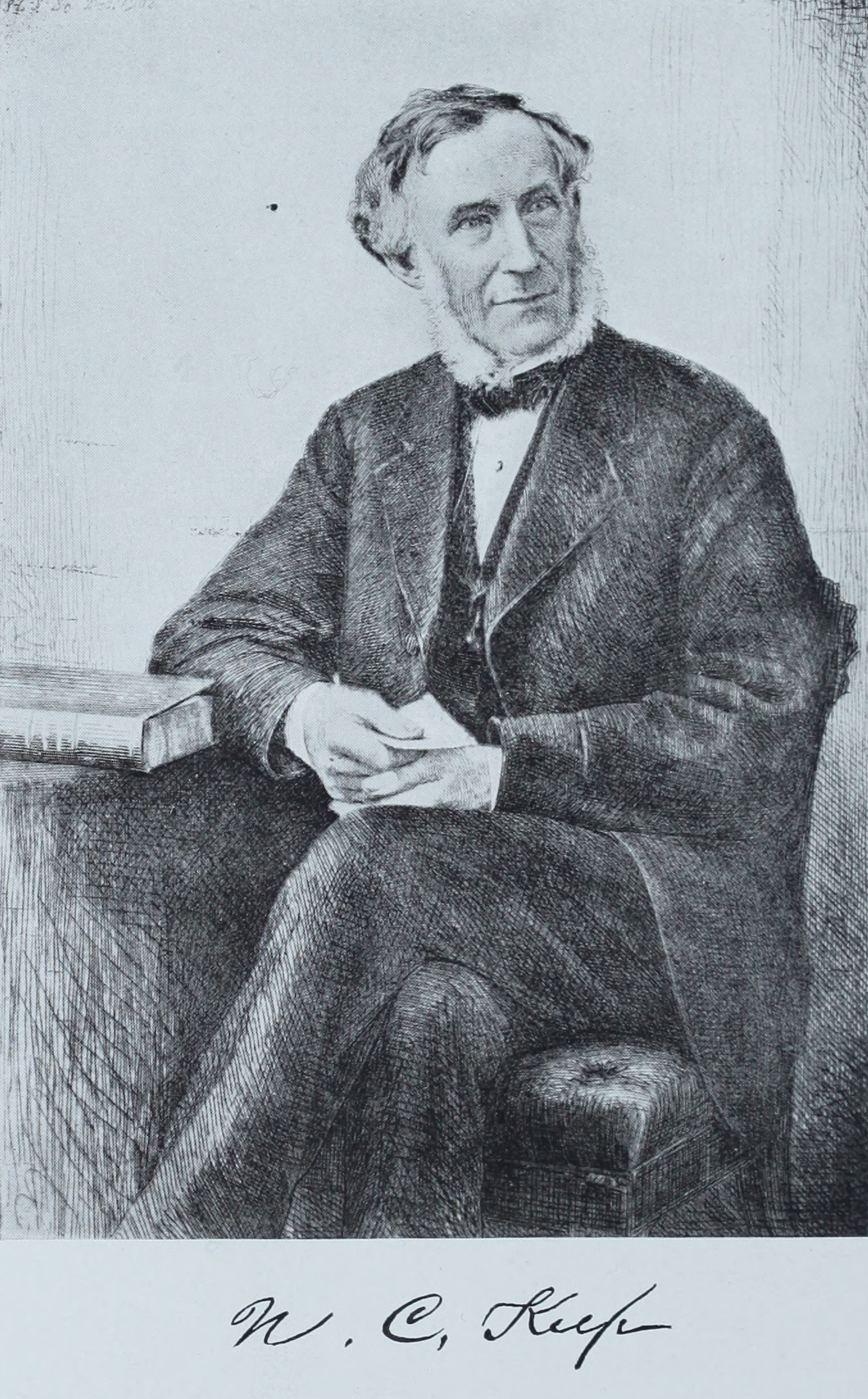
- Born: 23 December, 1800; Longmeadow, Massachusetts
- Died: 11 March, 1875; Boston, Massachusetts
- Spouse: Susan Prentice Haskell
- Scientific career
- Fields: Dentistry

Nathan Cooley Keep (1800–1875) was a pioneer in the field of dentistry, and the founding Dean of the Harvard School of Dental Medicine.

== Biography ==
Keep was born in Longmeadow, Massachusetts, on December 23, 1800 to Anna Bliss (1771-1831) and Samuel Keep (1774-1849). Adept with his hands, he became interested in dentistry following an apprenticeship with a local jeweler. In 1821, he moved to Boston and graduated from Harvard Medical School with an M.D. in 1827. He practiced dentistry for 40 years, was hailed for his proficiency, and in 1843 was awarded an honorary D.D.S. by the Baltimore College of Dental Surgery. Keep invented and manufactured many dental tools and is credited with being one of the first to manufacture porcelain teeth. Also a practicing physician, Keep was the first to use anesthesia for childbirth, administering ether to Fanny Longfellow, Henry Wadsworth Longfellow's wife, on the occasion of her daughter's birth on April 7, 1847.

He was a critical participant in the Parkman murder trial, the first time that dental work was introduced as forensic evidence. At the trial taken in 1850, Keep’s evidence was the key to positive identification of the body as being Parkman’s. Webster and Parkman were both friends and patients of Keep. Keep had made an unusual gold prosthesis to fit Parkman’s unique and prominent lower jaw. Both its peculiar construction and artificial teeth, which were invented by Keep, made it possible for him to identify the denture as being Parkman’s. While explaining his observation, after saying "the resemblance was so striking, that I could no longer have any doubt that they were his," he became emotional and was unable to proceed for some time. Ultimately, John White Webster, a professor of chemistry at the Medical School, was convicted and hanged for the murder of George Parkman.

Keep's lifelong interest was in elevating dentistry's status as a liberal profession. In his presidential address to the Massachusetts Dental Society in 1865, he remarked:

My own predilections would favor a thorough and united dental and medical education. I should hope in such a case that the degree of M.D. would be the lawful and merited appendage to the names of those young men who enter our speciality. If this, however, is not yet attainable, it may not be entirely out of place to inquire whether Harvard University might not appoint professors of dentistry, and confer upon proper candidates the degree of Doctor of Dental Surgery.

Two years later, in 1867, the first announcement of the Dental School of Harvard University was published, listing Keep as dean of a distinguished faculty. Keep's dream had come true; Harvard was to have the world's first university-based dental school.

Keep's administrative decisions exemplify his fair and moral character. One of these decisions is documented in Richard L. Hapgood's history of Harvard's dental school:

A colored dentist who had applied unsuccessfully to several dental schools for instruction, came to Boston, called upon Dean Nathan Cooley Keep, MD, DDS, and asked to be received. Upon Keep's recommendation the School Faculty decided that Harvard University should consider right and justice above expediency and should know no distinction of nativity or color in admitting students.

Robert Tanner Freeman, the son of former slaves, was accepted to Harvard's dental school at the age of 22 and graduated in 1869. He was the first African-American dental college graduate. Keep's administrative insistence upon "right and justice above expediency" in the Freeman case exemplified inherent leadership qualities that helped to establish an aura of fairness and morality that up to today has reflected with favor upon the university. The tower, or "keep", that appears on the shield of the Dental School honors Keep's pivotal role in the establishment of the school.

He died on March 11, 1875, at Boston, Massachusetts.
