= Lamar Soutter =

American academic

Lamar Soutter, MD (March 9, 1909 – 1996) was an American academic. He was the son of Helen Elizabeth Whiteside and Robert Soutter, a noted Boston orthopaedic surgeon. He graduated from Harvard College in 1931, with an AB in History, and from Harvard Medical School in 1935. He served residencies in Obstetrics and Gynecology and Thoracics. He was awarded the Silver Star for actions at the Battle of Bastogne in World War II, and went on to found the University of Massachusetts Medical School in Worcester, Massachusetts.

== Early life ==
In July 1931 Soutter signed on to be a crew member on the maiden sail of the Atlantis, Woods Hole Oceanographic Institution's first research vessel. Doctor Henry Bryant Bigelow, the first director of the Woods Hole Oceanographic Institution and professor of zoology at Harvard (and later, Soutter's father-in-law) received funding from the Rockefeller Foundation to build this vessel and to embark upon oceanographic and hydrographic investigations.

In the summer of 1934 Soutter and a friend, Graham Webster, paddled a canoe 1500-miles through uncharted Yukon wilderness. They experienced several setbacks, including a serious injury for Webster. They arrived safely at Ft. Yukon and traveled home through Fairbanks, Alaska.

== Career ==
=== Expeditions ===
The summer after he graduated from Harvard Medical School, Soutter joined a voyage with the famous Captain Robert A. Bartlett (1875–1946), who had been part of Admiral Robert Peary's group that discovered the North Pole in 1909. Bartlett had bought an old schooner, the Effie M. Morrissey, in 1926 and had been conducting oceanographic expeditions in the Arctic for various scientific organizations.

This particular expedition to northwest Greenland in 1935 was sponsored by the Smithsonian Institution, the Field Museum, and the National Museum. Soutter was ship's doctor and chief science officer. Captain Bartlett conducted the hydrographic and mineral studies and Soutter gathered plankton and fish samples. Soutter himself conducted almost 100 plankton experiments, many at 2 or 3 o'clock in the morning in the full daylight of the midnight sun. These experiments provided a foundation of knowledge of the sea and its inhabitants in cold climates. The expedition was also commissioned to bring back a live baby walrus for the Bronx Zoo and to make plaster casts of a narwhal, a small Arctic whale, for a future Smithsonian exhibit.

=== Hindenburg Disaster ===
On May 6, 1937, the Hindenburg, one of the largest zeppelins ever built, exploded in midair over Lakehurst Naval Air Station in New Jersey where it was attempting to land. One of the 62 survivors was the captain of the ship, Max Pruss. He was barely alive and had sustained severe burns that required several operations. Soutter, fluent in German, assisted in many surgical procedures on Hindenburg victims, including Captain Pruss. When Captain Pruss was well enough to travel back to his home in Frankfurt, Germany, Soutter accompanied him. While in Germany, he toured the zeppelin factories in Friedrichshafen near Lake Constance in the southern part of the country.

== Massachusetts General Hospital ==
After Soutter left his residencies in New York City, he settled back in Boston, his hometown. In 1940, Soutter went to work at Massachusetts General Hospital (MGH) to assist on the surgical staff. With the outbreak of World War II, Soutter believed that a blood bank was critical for civil defense. He solicited funds to pay for the equipment, and he and his staff created new techniques for blood filtration and purification. Patients were blood typed in advance of their operative procedures. Soutter helped to create an elaborate system for managing blood and began work advertising for volunteer donors. When the Cocoanut Grove fire occurred in Boston in November 1942, large amounts of stored plasma from the MGH blood bank played a major role in the treatment of the 500 injured.

== World War II ==
In 1943, Soutter was assigned to the Army's Fourth Auxiliary Surgical Unit and commanded a team attached to the First and Third Armies who were fighting in Europe.

On December 26, 1944, Soutter was the first volunteer when General McAuliffe called for medical assistance for the wounded troops who were surrounded at Bastogne in Belgium near the French border. Twelve medical personnel filed into an engineless glider that had been loaded with medical supplies. The glider's towline was picked up by a C47 cargo plane and the aircraft became airborne. Then, the tether line was disengaged and the glider sailed low and silent over the forests of Ardennes. They landed in the middle of a field. The occupants had to wait for a lull in the fighting to leave the glider and then had to run for the medical tent. Soutter and the other medical personnel performed 63 operations in the next 24 hours. Within the next couple of days, the First and Third Army Divisions broke through the enemy perimeter and began to make their way to liberate Bastogne. In mid-January 1945, Soutter and each member of his medical team received the Silver Star (see left below), the second highest military medal awarded, for "conspicuous gallantry in action."

In 2002 the World War II Veterans of the Battle of the Bulge Association named their Worcester chapter after Soutter. After Bastogne, Soutter was attached to the 42nd Field Hospital, where he worked with Corporal James K. Sunshine, Surgical Technician 3rd Platoon. Mr.l Sunshine recounted his World War II experiences and the beginning of a lifelong friendship with Major Soutter in an article originally published under the title "War Stories" in the Providence Sun Journal in 1994.

An account of Soutter and his team's work in Bastogne was published in the Army's That Men Might Live—The Story of the Army Medical Corps.

=== Academia ===
In 1952, Soutter became an associate professor in the surgery department of the Boston University School of Medicine (BUSM). There he developed innovative ideas about medical education and how it is structured. He saw a need for medical education to broaden itself to include much more than just chemistry and science. He realized that the delivery of health care had to change and the education of physicians must follow suit. The number of generalist physicians was declining, and Soutter sought to address this problem by training more generalists who would work along with the specialists. At BUSM his career as a medical educator progressed from his appointment as Associate Dean in 1955, to Acting Dean in 1959, and then to Dean in 1960.

In October 1962, legislation was enacted establishing the University of Massachusetts Medical School and in December 1963 Massachusetts Governor Endicott Peabody named Soutter Dean of the Medical School project. In February 1964, Soutter began to select faculty and on October 23, 1969, ground was broken at the campus in Worcester. The first class was graduated in 1974.

== Medical libraries ==
Soutter took an active interest in libraries and the role they have played in the education of physicians throughout the ages. As a trustee of the Boston Medical Library in the 1960s, he was instrumental in orchestrating a merger of the Harvard Medical School's library collection with that of the Boston Medical Library in 1965. A large medical library, the Francis A. Countway Library, was being built expressly for the purpose of the merger. Harvard's library collection was established in 1782, the date of the founding of the medical school there, and the Boston Medical Library's collection was established in 1875.

When Soutter came to Worcester in the late 1960s, he was the catalyst for the merger of the library collection of the Worcester District Medical Society with that of the newly founded University of Massachusetts Medical School. The plans for the new school's library included a Rare Book Room specifically intended to house the collection of the Worcester Medical Library, which was established in 1798. The merger finally became a reality when the Medical School Library opened its doors in 1973. Mr Charles C. Colby III, Librarian at the Boston Medical Library, was the library consultant on the project. The Medical School Library was renamed The Lamar Soutter Library in 1981 in Soutter's honor.

== Personal life ==
Soutter was married to Norah Goldsmith in New York City in 1939, and they had a son, Nicholas. They divorced, and in 1946 Soutter married Mary Cleveland Bigelow. Together, they raised Nicholas and two daughters. Soutter died in Concord, Massachusetts in 1996.
