= Wyman (surname) =

Wyman may refer to:

- A. U. Wyman (1833–1915), Treasurer of the United States
- Alfred Lee Wyman (1874–1953), United States federal judge
- Bill Wyman (born 1936), British bassist
- Bill Wyman (American football) (1951–2013)
- Brad Wyman (born 1963), American film producer
- Charles E. Wyman, chair of the Ford Motor Company and professor at the University of California, Riverside
- Dan Wyman, American composer and educator
- Dave Wyman (born 1964), American football player
- David Wyman (1929–2018), American historian
- Devin Wyman (born 1973), American football player
- Donald Wyman (1904–1993), American horticulturist
- Eldon P. Wyman (1917–1941), ensign of the U.S. Navy
- George A. Wyman (1877–1959), first person to make a transcontinental crossing of the United States on a motor vehicle
- George Herbert Wyman (1860 – c. 1900), American architect
- Helen Wyman (born 1981), British cyclist
- Henry A. Wyman (died 1935), acting Attorney General of Massachusetts
- Ida Wyman (1926–2019), American photographer
- Irma Wyman (1928–2015), American computer engineer and business executive
- Isaac Wyman (1724–1792), colonel of the American Revolutionary War
- J. H. Wyman (born 1967), American film and TV producer
- J. T. Wyman (born 1986), American hockey player
- Jemima Wyman (born 1977), Australian artist
- Jane Wyman (1917–2007), American actress
- Jeffries Wyman (1814–1874), American naturalist
- Jeffries Wyman (biologist) (1901–1995), American biophysicist
- John Wyman (actor), British actor
- John Wyman (magician) (1816–1881), American magician
- Julie Wyman, American film director
- Kim Wyman (born 1962), Secretary of State of Washington
- Lance Wyman (born 1937), American graphic designer
- Laurence Wyman, American saxophone teacher
- Lawrie Wyman (1923–1982), British comedy scriptwriter
- Lillie Buffum Chace Wyman (1847–1929), American author and social reformer
- Loraine Wyman (1885–1937), American folksinger
- Louis C. Wyman (1917–2002), U.S. representative and Senator
- Morrill Wyman (1812–1903), American physician
- Nancy Wyman (1946–2026), Lieutenant Governor of Connecticut
- Nick Wyman (born 1950), American actor
- Oliver Wyman (actor) (born 1966), American voice actor
- Peter Wyman, British accountant
- Phil Wyman (1945–2019), American politician
- Pudge Wyman (1895–1961), American football player
- Robert Wyman (disambiguation)
- Rosalind Wiener Wyman (1930–2022), Los Angeles City councilwoman
- Rufus Wyman (1778–1842), American physician
- Sid Wyman (1910–1978), American poker player
- Walter Wyman (1848–1911), Surgeon General of the United States
- Walter S. Wyman (1874–1942), American businessman
- W. Robert Wyman (1930–2007), Canadian businessman
- Willard G. Wyman (1898–1969), American general

== Fictional characters ==
- Lucy "Tom-Tom" Wyman in the movie 13 Going on 30

== See also ==
- Wyman (disambiguation)
