= Weymann-Lepère WEL-80 =

WEL-80 R.2
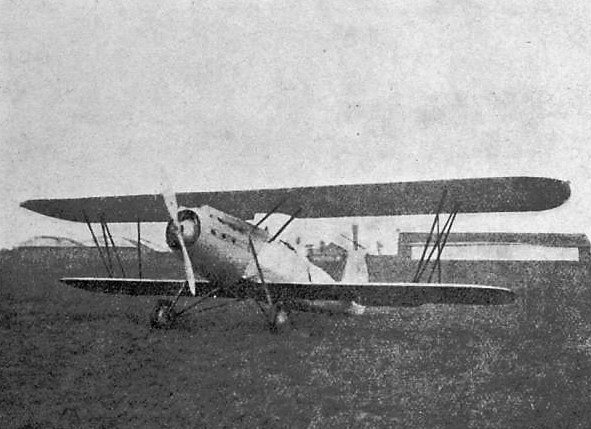

General information
- Type: Reconnaissance aircraft
- National origin: France
- Manufacturer: Société des Avions C.T. Weymann
- Designer: Lepère
- Number built: 2

History
- First flight: 1931

The Weymann-Lepère WEL-80 R.2 was a French two-seat reconnaissance aircraft developed in response to a 1928 government requirement. Intended for military observation roles, it was evaluated alongside competing designs but was not selected for production, and only a single prototype was built.

== Design ==
The French R.2 specification of 1928 called for an all-metal, two seat reconnaissance aircraft, fast and with a rapid climb rate and large radius of action. It led to prototypes from eight manufacturers, the Amiot 130, Breguet 33, Latécoère 490, Les Mureaux 111, Nieuport-Delage Ni-D 580, Potez 37, Wibault 260 and the Weymann WEL-80 R.2. One of the terms of the specification required the manufacturers to use a Hispano-Suiza 12Nb water-cooled V-12 engine.

The Weymann WEL-80 was an unequal span single bay biplane. It had strong stagger, no dihedral and a lower wing which was smaller not only in span (14%) but also in chord (20%) and so in area (40%). The wings were similar in plan, rectangular out to angled, blunted tips, though with differently shaped cut-outs for better upward and downward views from the cockpit. They had all-dural structures with two I-section spars and were fabric covered. There were ailerons on both upper and lower wings which occupied most of each trailing edge and were linked together by external rods. Upper and lower wings were braced by outward leaning duralumin N-form interplane struts; the lower wing was mounted on the lower fuselage and the upper one joined to the upper fuselage with outward leaning, parallel pairs of cabane struts on each side. Wire bracing completed the structure.

The V-12 Hispano engine was mounted in the nose behind a large radiator fitted with vanes to control the engine temperature. The engine mounting and the rest of the fuselage structure was built from molybdenum-chrome steel tubes. Behind the engine, which had a metal cowling, the outer fuselage form was set by wooden frames and stringers, then covered in fabric. The two open cockpits were in tandem, with the pilot just aft of the upper wing and the observer close behind. His position was equipped for wireless and photography as well as with a pair of flexibly mounted machine guns. The pilot controlled two more fixed guns which fired through the propeller disc. At the rear the empennage was conventional, with a narrow chord, rectangular tailplane mounting broader, blunt ended, balanced, separate elevators. Its much larger, rounded vertical tail had a broad-chord fin and generous, balanced rudder which extended to the keel. Fin and tailplane were braced together with twin parallel wires on each side.

The 80 R.2 had a conventional fixed, tailwheel undercarriage. Its wheels were independently mounted, with axles at the vertices of V-struts hinged to the central lower fuselage and oleo strut shock absorbers from the axles to the upper fuselage. The wheels, 3.0 m (9 ft 10 in) apart, were fitted with brakes and fairings. Its tailwheel was steerable.

== Development ==
The Weymann WEL-80 first flew in January 1931. The S.T.I.Aé Concours des avions de grande reconnaissance (Long range reconnaissance aircraft competition) at Villacoublay began in April 1931 and, unusually, lasted about a year. The contest winner was the ANF Les Mureaux 111.

A second Weymann 80 was built with wings that had wooden structures and were plywood covered. Weymann argued that construction in wood was simpler, cheaper and more familiar to workers from the civil aircraft industry and did not degrade performance. This version had performance figures better than those specified for the all-metal aircraft of the Concours.

The design first flew in December 1932 and was under test at Villacoublay the following month.

== Specifications ==
Data from Les Ailes January 1932

General characteristics

- Crew: Two
- Length: 8.80 m (28 ft 10 in)
- Upper wingspan: 14.0 m (45 ft 11 in)
- Lower wingspan: 12.0 m (39 ft 4 in)
- Height: 3.30 m (10 ft 10 in)
- Wing area: 42 m^{2} (450 sq ft)
- Airfoil: R.A.F. 28
- Empty weight: 1,450 kg (3,197 lb)
- Gross weight: 2,250 kg (4,960 lb)
- Powerplant: 1 × Hispano-Suiza 12Nb water-cooled V-12, 480 kW (650 hp)
- Propellers: 2-bladed Ratier, metal, variable pitch

Performance

- Maximum speed: 270 km/h (170 mph, 150 kn) at sea level
- Range: 1,000 km (620 mi, 540 nmi)
- Service ceiling: 8,500 m (27,900 ft) practical
- Time to altitude: 26 min to 7,000 m (23,000 ft)
- Take-off distance: 100 m (330 ft)
- Landing distance: 100 m (330 ft)

Armament

- Two fixed forward firing machine guns and two paired and flexibly mounted in observer's cockpit
