= Wibault 260 =

French reconnaissance aircraft prototype of around 1930

Wibault 260 R.2

General information
- Type: Long range reconnaissance aircraft
- National origin: France
- Manufacturer: Société des Avions Michel Wibault
- Designer: Michel Wibault
- Number built: 2

History
- First flight: S1 1930

The Wibault 260 R.2 was a contender for a French government contract for a long range, two seat reconnaissance aircraft, issued in 1928. There were eight prototypes in the 1931-2 contest and the Wibault was not selected for production.

== Design ==
The French R.2 specification of 1928 called for an all-metal two seat reconnaissance aircraft, fast and with a rapid climb rate and large radius of action. It led to prototypes from eight manufacturers, the Amiot 130, Breguet 33, Latécoère 490, Les Mureaux 111, Nieuport-Delage Ni-D 580, Potez 37, Weymann WEL-80 and the Wibault 260. One of the terms of the specification required the manufacturers to use a Hispano-Suiza 12Nb water-cooled V-12 engine.

The Wibault 260 was an all-metal monoplane with a parasol, cantilever wing. In plan the wing was largely trapezoidal out to blunt tips, with most of the sweep on the trailing edges, though it had a short span centre-section with an unswept leading edge and a deep cut-out in the trailing edge to improve the field of view from the cockpit. The thickness/chord ratio of the outer panels decreased progressively towards the tips. There was no dihedral. High aspect ratio ailerons filled the entire trailing edges. Wing and fuselage were joined by a pair of outward leaning, approximately N-form cabane struts between the outer ends of the centre-section and the upper fuselage. The wings were built around two spars and dural skinned.

Its fuselage was constructed entirely in duralumin, with four longerons which defined its rectangular cross-section. Its water-cooled 480 kW (650 hp) Hispano-Suiza 12Nb upright V-12 engine was in the nose within a pointed engine cowling with bulges around the two cylinder blocks. Its shallow radiator curved around the underside of the forward fuselage at the rear of the engine. A 500 L (110 imp gal; 130 US gal) fuel tank was behind the fire wall. Aft, the pilot's cockpit was under the wing cut-out with a forward view under the wing and equipped with two fixed machine guns firing through the propeller disk. The observer/gunner's position was immediately behind the pilot and was equipped with photographic and radio equipment, together with two flexibly mounted machine guns.

The empennage was conventional, with a triangular plan tailplane mounted near the top of the fuselage and braced on each side with a strut to the lower fuselage. Its angle of incidence could be adjusted in flight by the pilot. The elevators were narrow and rectangular apart from central cut-outs to allow operation of the trapezoidal rudder, which extended down to the keel and was mounted on a triangular fin.

The Wibault 260 had fixed, conventional steel landing gear with a track of 2.60 m (8 ft 6 in), its wheels fitted with brakes. Upward sloping half-axles met centrally under the fuselage at the vertex of a transverse V-strut and, on each side, a faired, long displacement oleo leg and a faired drag strut, both from the lower fuselage longeron, carried the outer end of the axle. The tailskid also had an oleo strut.

== Development ==
The date of the Wibault 260's first flight is not known but it was flying by mid-1930. In early November 1930 Ribière gave a "trés belle" (very fine) demonstration of it at Villacoublay.

The S.T.I.Aé Concours des avions de grande reconnaissance (Long range reconnaissance aircraft competition) at Villacoublay began in April 1931 and, unusually, lasted about a year. The French government had paid in March 1930 for two Wibault 260s to be built for the contest but the winner was the ANF Les Mureaux 111, so the Wibault did not go into production.

== Specifications ==
Data from Les Ailes August 1930

General characteristics

- Crew: Two
- Length: 10.38 m (34 ft 1 in)
- Wingspan: 14.939 m (49 ft 0 in)
- Height: 3.619 m (11 ft 10 in)
- Wing area: 30.345 m^{2} (326.63 sq ft)
- Empty weight: 1,800 kg (3,968 lb)
- Gross weight: 2,570 kg (5,666 lb)
- Fuel capacity: 500 L (110 imp gal; 130 US gal)
- Powerplant: 1 × Hispano-Suiza 12Nb water-cooled, upright V-12, 532 kW (713 hp) notional power 480 kW (650 hp)
- Propellers: 2-bladed

Performance

- Range: 900 km (560 mi, 490 nmi)
- Service ceiling: 5,000 m (16,000 ft) operational

Armament

- Two fixed, forward firing machine guns and two flexibly mounted machine guns
