= Amiot 130 =

General information
- Type: Long range reconnaissance aircraft
- National origin: France
- Manufacturer: SECM-Amiot
- Number built: 1

History
- First flight: April 1931

The SECM-Amiot 130 R.2 was a contender for a French government contract for a long range, two seat reconnaissance aircraft, issued in 1928. There were eight prototypes in the 1931–32 contest and the Amiot 130 was not selected for production.

== Design and development ==
The French R.2 specification of 1928 called for an all-metal two seat reconnaissance aircraft, fast and with a rapid climb rate and large radius of action. It led to prototypes from eight manufacturers, the Amiot 130, Breguet 33, Latécoère 490, Les Mureaux 111, Nieuport-Delage Ni-D 580, Potez 37, Weymann WEL-80 and the Wibault 260. One of the terms of the specification required the manufacturers to use a Hispano-Suiza 12Nb water-cooled V-12 engine.

Like all but two of the competing prototypes, the Amiot 130 was a parasol wing aircraft. The two-part, straight-edged, tapered wing had sweep only on the leading edge and blunt, angled tips. There was a large, semi-circular cut-out over the cockpits to enhance upward visibility. The wing was built around two spars and covered with finely corrugated duralumin. It was braced from the lower fuselage on each side with parallel pairs of flying struts to the spars near mid-span. The wing was held centrally over the fuselage on cabane struts.

The Amiot 130's engine was housed in a close-fitting cowling which followed the contours of its two-cylinder banks. Its low-profile radiators were mounted vertically on the fuselage sides, just behind the engine. Amiot put considerable effort into silencing the engine, streaming the exhaust via a long duralumin tube into a gutter extending almost to the tail. The two open cockpits were in tandem, with the pilot under the rear part of the wing and the observer close behind. He had a flexible mount for a pair ofdefensive machine guns.

The fuselage of the Amiot 130, built around four longerons, was long and slender, with a rounded upper surface. Its vertical tail was oval. The horizontal tail was straight-tapered but the elevators had prominent horn balances.

The Amiot had a conventional fixed undercarriage with its mainwheels on axles mounted at the vertices of V-struts, with the forward components hinged on the central fuselage underside and the rear drag struts on the lower fuselage longerons. Each axle had a long oleo strut mounted on the mid-side of the fuselage, just aft of the engine.

The type 130 first flew in April 1931. Although the STAé Concours des avions de grande reconnaissance (Long range reconnaissance aircraft competition) at Villacoublay began in April 1931 lasted about a year, there are no reports of it taking part. Having flown it long enough to receive payment from the French government, Amiot concentrated on other projects. It was used five years later in experiments with early gyroscopic autopilot experiments.

== Specifications ==
Data from L'Aéronautique August 1931 (General), AviaFrance (Performance)

General characteristics

- Crew: Two
- Length: 10.50 m (34 ft 5 in)
- Wingspan: 17.48 m (57 ft 4 in)
- Height: 3.69 m (12 ft 1 in)
- Wing area: 45 m^{2} (480 sq ft)
- Empty weight: 1,741 kg (3,838 lb)
- Gross weight: 2,513–2,539 kg (5,540–5,598 lb) according to mission
- Powerplant: 1 × Hispano-Suiza 12Nb water-cooled, upright V-12, 480 kW (650 hp)
- Propellers: 2-bladed

Performance

- Maximum speed: 270 km/h (170 mph, 150 kn)
- Range: 900 km (560 mi, 490 nmi)
- Service ceiling: 7,800 m (25,600 ft)
