= Nieuport-Delage NiD 580 =

NiD 580
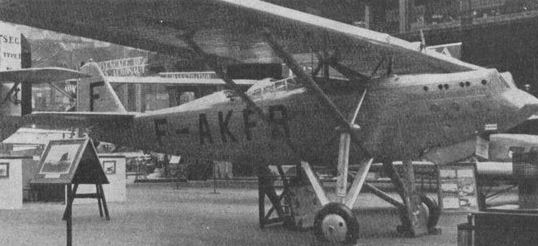

General information
- Type: Long range reconnaissance aircraft
- National origin: France
- Manufacturer: Nieuport-Delage
- Number built: 2

The Nieuport-Delage NiD 580 R.2 was a contender for a French government contract for a long range, two seat reconnaissance aircraft, issued in 1928. There were eight prototypes in the 1931-2 contest and the NiD 580 was not selected for production.

== Design ==
The French R.2 specification of 1928 called for an all-metal two seat reconnaissance aircraft, fast and with a rapid climb rate and large radius of action. It led to prototypes from eight manufacturers, the Amiot 130, Breguet 33, Latécoère 490, Les Mureaux 111, Nieuport-Delage Ni-D 580, Potez 37, Weymann WEL-80 and the Wibault 260. One of the terms of the specification required the manufacturers to use a Hispano-Suiza 12Nb water-cooled V-12 engine.

The NiD 580 was a monoplane with a two-part parasol wing, built around a central box formed by two interbraced spars In plan the wing was trapezoidal out to angled tips, with only slight dihedral. It had full span, high aspect ratio ailerons. The wing was supported on each side by a pair of parallel, faired duralumin struts from the lower fuselage longerons to the wing spars and attached centrally, low over the fuselage, on a triangular dural cabane.

The engine was mounted in the nose, enclosed in a close fitting cowling which followed the profiles of the two cylinder banks and with its radiator in a long NACA fairing on the cowling below the engine. The fuselage, built around four longerons, had an equilateral triangular section, vertex down. The pilot's cockpit near the trailing edge gave him a forward view under the wing. The observer/gunner had a separate cockpit close behind the pilot and a rounded wing cut-out improved the upward field of view from both. Both cockpits had unusual, extensive, multiframed windscreens and the observer's at least could be folded. His position was fitted with a flexible machine gun mounting.

The NiD 580's angular empennage was conventional, with a straight-tapered tailplane and elevators mounted on top of the fuselage. The fin was triangular and carried a nearly rectangular rudder, hinged behind the elevators, above the keel. It had a fixed, conventional undercarriage with mainwheels on axles at the vertices of faired V-struts hinged on the fuselage at the ends of the wing struts. On each side, a shock-absorbing leg was mounted on the forward wing strut at a point strengthened by two short struts, one to the upper fuselage longeron and one to the rear wing strut mounting point.

== Development ==
The French government purchased two NiD 580s, as they did with the other prototypes. The date of the first flight is not known but both flew during the trials. The S.T.I.Aé Concours des avions de grande reconnaissance (Long range reconnaissance aircraft competition) at Villacoublay had begun in April 1931 and, unusually, lasted about a year. The winner was the ANF Les Mureaux 111, so the Nieuport-Delage did not go into production.

Despite this lack of success, the NiD 580 was on display at the 18th Paris Aero Salon, held in November–December 1932.

== Specifications ==
Data from Le Genie Civil, December 1932

General characteristics

- Crew: Two
- Length: 10.10 m (33 ft 2 in)
- Wingspan: 15.00 m (49 ft 3 in)
- Height: 3.40 m (11 ft 2 in)
- Wing area: 38 m^{2} (410 sq ft)
- Empty weight: 1,828 kg (4,030 lb)
- Gross weight: 2,635 kg (5,809 lb)
- Powerplant: 1 × Hispano-Suiza 12Nb water-cooled, upright V-12, 480 kW (650 hp)
- Propellers: 2-bladed

Performance

- Maximum speed: 265 km/h (165 mph, 143 kn) at ground level
- Range: 1,000 km (620 mi, 540 nmi)
- Service ceiling: 8,000 m (26,000 ft)
- Time to altitude: 15 min 26 sec to 5,000 m (16,000 ft)

Armament

- Machine guns: Two fixed forward firing, pilot controlled and two on a flexible mount in observer's cockpit.
