= Potez 37 =

French reconnaissance aircraft of the 1930s

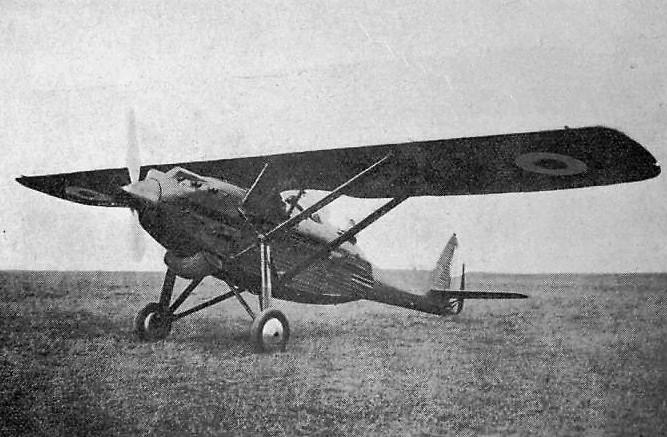

General information
- Type: Reconnaissance aircraft
- National origin: France
- Manufacturer: Aéroplanes Henry Potez
- Number built: 2

History
- First flight: mid-1930

The Potez 37 was a two-seat, long range reconnaissance aircraft built to compete for a French government contract. It flew in mid-1930 but did not win the competition, so only two were completed.

== Design ==
The French R.2 specification of 1928 called for an all-metal two seat reconnaissance aircraft, fast and with a rapid climb rate and large radius of action. It led to prototypes from eight manufacturers, the Amiot 130, Breguet 33, Latécoère 490, Les Mureaux 111, Nieuport-Delage Ni-D 580, Potez 37, Weymann WEL-80 and the Wibault 260. One of the terms of the specification required the manufacturers to use a single Hispano-Suiza 12Nb water-cooled V-12 engine.

The Potez 37 was a parasol wing aircraft. Its wing was in three parts, with a small centre-section attached to the upper fuselage on two outward-leaning, N-form cabane struts and with two outer panels, each mounted at about half-span on a parallel pair of struts from the lower fuselage. Like all the struts, these were enclosed in airfoil section fairings. In plan the wings had straight, unswept leading edges but were mildly curved over the trailing edges and tips. There was a rounded cut-out in the centre-section's trailing edge to assist the pilot's upward view. Generous ailerons filled much of the trailing edges outboard. Structurally each outer panel was built around two steel spars with dural ribs and dural covered; the leading edges were readily removable.

The fuselage was in three parts. The forward part mounted the Hispano-Suiza V-12 engine within a close-fitting, sheet metal cowling that followed the cylinder banks and with a curved, transverse Lamblin radiator under its rear. Behind the engine the fuselage structure was a conventional rectangular section girder frame bearing wing struts and undercarriage and containing two tandem open cockpits. The aircraft was normally flown from the forward one, placed under the wing cut-out, and the observer's position was close behind, equipped with flying controls including a demountable control column, a flexible machine gun mounting and small side-windows. Immediately aft the girder cross-section was reduced rapidly, then joined to the final part of the fuselage, an unusual truncated dural cone strengthened internally with longerons and frames.

The tail unit was conventional, with a blunted triangular fin mounting a curved, deep rudder. A high aspect ratio tailplane was mounted just above the fuselage on the fin; supported on inverted V-struts from below, its angle of incidence could be adjusted in flight. The elevators were narrow in chord; in plan the horizontal tail was straight-tapered with blunted tips.

The Potez 37 had fixed, conventional landing gear, with mainwheels, equipped with brakes, placed 3.0 m (9 ft 10 in) apart at the ends of half-axles and drag struts hinged to the fuselage. The wheels had near-vertical shock absorbers mounted on the forward wing struts at a point reinforced by extra struts to the upper fuselage and to the base of the rear wing strut. There was a small, sprung tailskid.

== Development ==
Potez 37 left rear view

The date of the first flight of the Potez 37 is not known but test flights, flown by Lemoine, were under way by June 1930. Lemoine and Duroyon continued development flying until at least the end of July. They reported agreeable and straightforward handling characteristics.

The S.T.I.Aé Concours des avions de grande reconnaissance (Long range reconnaissance aircraft competition) began at Villacoublay in April 1931, with all prototypes bar the Breguet gathered together. The selection process was unusually long and, while it continued, a second Potez 37 was completed and began testing. It had been fitted with a new radiator and preliminary flights suggested it was faster. In April 1932, after a year of contest, the ANF-Mureax 111 was declared winner so no more Potez 37s were built.

One at least was still flying about eighteen months later and took part in the 3rd Tour de France du Prototypes in September 1933. Starting on 9 September the eight prototypes, led by Jonchay in the Potez, flew from Orly on a nine-day circuit around northern France.

From 1930 to 1938 French military prototypes appeared on the Civil Register in the F-AKxx group. The first Potez 37 was F-AKFS and the second F-AKFT. The register records a type change of the latter to Potez 371.

== Specifications ==
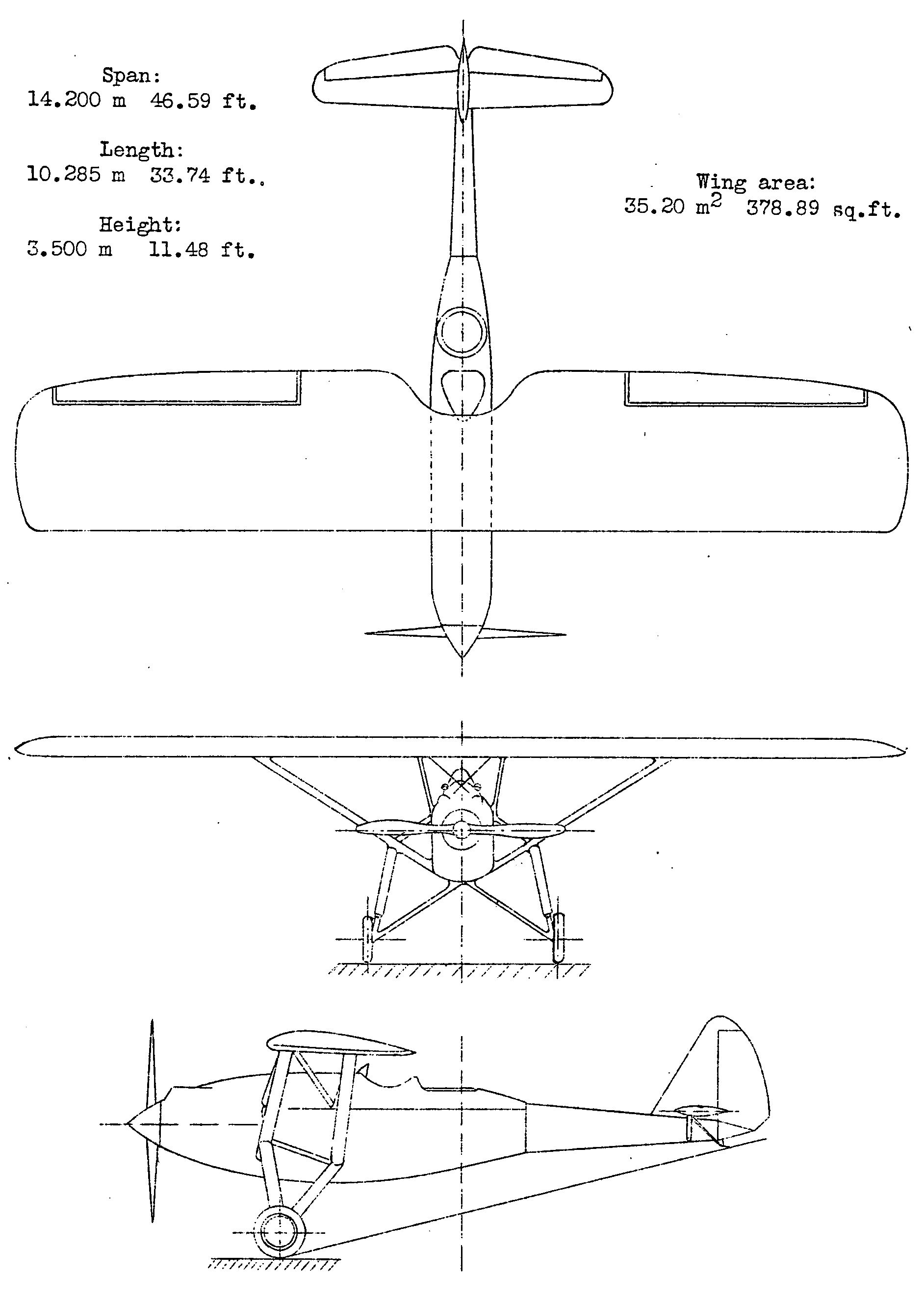
Potez 37 3-view drawing from NACA aircraft Circular No.152

Data from Les Ailes December 1930

General characteristics

- Crew: Two
- Length: 10.285 m (33 ft 9 in)
- Wingspan: 14.20 m (46 ft 7 in)
- Height: 3.50 m (11 ft 6 in)
- Wing area: 35 m^{2} (380 sq ft)
- Airfoil: Clark YH (Note: Les Ailles gives the airfoil as Clark VH, which exists, but also notes the same airfoil was used on the Potez 39. This had the much more widely used Clark YH.)
- Empty weight: 1,574 kg (3,470 lb)
- Gross weight: 2,536 kg (5,591 lb)
- Fuel capacity: 340 kg (750 lb) including oil
- Powerplant: 1 × Hispano-Suiza 12Nb water-cooled V-12, 510 kW (680 hp)
- Propellers: 2-bladed

Performance

- Maximum speed: 264 km/h (164 mph, 143 kn) at ground level
- Service ceiling: 7,500 m (24,600 ft) absolute
- Time to altitude: 8 min to 3,000 m (9,800 ft)
- Take-off run: 190 m (620 ft)
- Landing run: 205 m (673 ft)
