= Wayman =

Wayman may refer to:

== People ==
=== Surname ===
- Alex Wayman (1921–2004), Tibetologist, and Indologist, worked as a professor of Sanskrit at Columbia University
- Charlie Wayman (1922–2006), English footballer
- David Wayman (born 1988), English actor
- Frank Wayman (1931–2008), English footballer
- Jack Wayman (1922–2014), consumer electronics industry veteran and creator of the Consumer Electronics Show
- James Lewis Wayman, American engineer
- Michael Wayman (born 1953), British former professional tennis player
- Nicholas Wayman-Harris, British film editor based in Santa Monica, California
- Patrick Wayman (1927–1998), English astronomer and director of Dunsink Observatory from 1964 to 1992
- Robert Wayman (1945–2022), chief financial officer and executive vice president of the Hewlett-Packard Company
- Theresa Wayman (born 1980), a.k.a. TT, American musician, singer-songwriter and occasional actress
- Thomas Wayman (1833–1901), English politician
- Tom Wayman (born 1945), Canadian poet and academic
- Tommy Wayman, retired American polo player

=== Given name ===
- Wayman Elbridge Adams (1883–1959), American painter best known for his portraits of famous people
- Wayman Britt (born 1952), retired American basketball player
- Wayman Carver (1905–1967), American jazz flautist and reeds player
- Wayman Crow (1808–1885), one of the founders of Washington University, a St. Louis businessmen and a politician
- Wayman C. McCreery, (1851–1901), real estate agent, opera composer, internal revenue collector of St. Louis
- Wayman Mitchell (1929–2020), the founder of Christian Fellowship Ministries or the Potters House
- Wayman Presley (1896–1990), rural mail carrier in Makanda, Illinois
- Wayman Tisdale (1964–2009), American professional basketball player in the NBA and a bass guitarist

== Places ==
=== United States ===
- Waymansville, Indiana, unincorporated community

== See also ==
- Cryin' for Me (Wayman's Song), song written and recorded by country music artist Toby Keith on his 2009 album American Ride
- Weymann (disambiguation)
- Wyman (disambiguation)
