= Weymann =

Weymann may refer to:

People

- Charles Terres Weymann (1889–1976), Haitian-born early aeroplane racing pilot and businessman
- Ray Weymann, retired astronomer and astrophysicist, associated with the Carnegie Institution of Washington

Aircraft

- Weymann Fabric Bodies, patented design system for fuselages for aircraft and superlight coachwork for motor vehicles
- Weymann W-1, French single seat biplane fighter aircraft, built during World War I
- Weymann 66, French multipurpose biplane built for colonial work in the 1930s
- Weymann W-100, French three seat observation aircraft with a position for the observer within its partially glazed fuselage
- Weymann-Lepère WEL-80, French two seat reconnaissance aircraft built to compete for a 1928 government contract

Other

- Metro Cammell Weymann, once a major contributor in transportation manufacturing in the UK and Europe
- Weymann guitars, one of Americas oldest musical instrument manufacturers

== See also ==
- Weyman
- Wyman (disambiguation)
