= Weman =

Weman is a surname. Notable people with the surname include:

- Adèle Weman (1844–1936), Finnish writer and educator
- Gunnar Weman (1932–2024), Swedish Lutheran archbishop

== See also ==
- Weyman
