= Potez 39 =

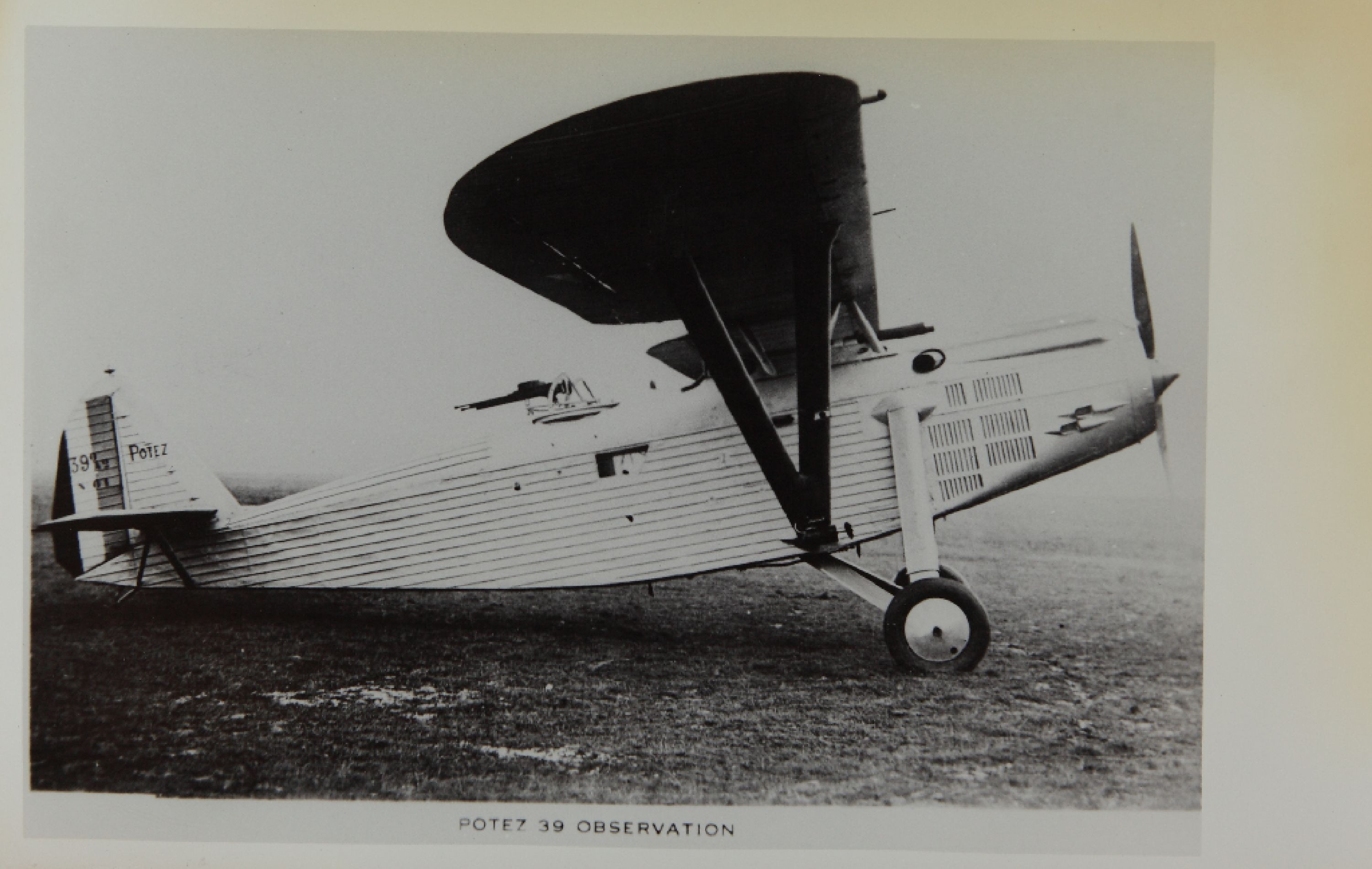

General information
- Type: Observation
- Manufacturer: Potez
- Primary users: French Air Force Peruvian Air Force
- Number built: 112 plus prototypes

History
- Introduction date: 1934
- First flight: January 1930
- Retired: 1940

The Potez 39 was a twin-seat single-engined parasol wing monoplane aerial reconnaissance and observation aircraft designed and produced by the French aircraft manufacturer Potez. It was the company's first all-metal aircraft.

It was developed in response to a specification released in 1928 for a new reconnaissance aircraft to succeed the Potez 25 and Breguet 19. The design team performed a detailed study of both mixed-construction and metal-centric aircraft prior to designing the all-metal Potez 39; numerous prototype and derivative aircraft were conceived of by Potez, including that of a floatplane, however, besides the French Air Force, only Peru would opt to order the type.

The new aircraft, which performed its maiden flight in January 1930, came as the runner up to the Breguet 27, but was still selected for production. While the Potez 39 was still in service with seven observation squadrons at the outbreak of the Second World War, the French Air Force elected to rapidly withdraw the type from frontline service and instead use it as a trainer aircraft up until the armistice of June 1940, after which point the remaining aircraft were scrapped.

== Development ==
The Potez 39 was designed to a fulfil a requirement issued during 1928 for an aircraft to replace both the Potez 25 and Breguet 19 aircraft then in service with the French Air Force in the A2 (Artillerie Biplace - two seat observation aircraft) role. One key feature that was stipulated by the specification was the use of the Hispano-Suiza 12H engine, which was capable of producing up to 580 bhp (430 kW).

In response, the company's design team produced a new aircraft along the same basic lines as the earlier Potez 25; however, unlike its predecessor, it featured all-metal construction instead the traditional mixed-construction practices that had been long used by the company. Development of what would become the Potez 39 was heavily shaped by a period of methodical study conducted at Méaulte under the direction of the aeronautical engineer Louis Coroller; this was initially carried out on conventional monoplanes before progressing to metal aircraft that were adapted for quantity production.

During January 1930, the prototype conducted its maiden flight. Although the Breguet 27 was selected as the winner of the competition, both it and the Potez, which was the runner-up, were chosen for production. Compared to the Potez 25, of which over 2,000 were ordered, production of the Potez 39 series was on a smaller scale. A total of 100 Potez 390 aircraft were built for France while 12 Potez 391 aircraft, powered by a Lorraine-Dietrich 12H engine capable of generating up to 700 bhp, were produced to the Peruvian Air Force. A number of prototype and development aircraft, including a floatplane, underwent flight testing, however, no further orders were received.

== Design ==
The Potez 39 was a dedicated aerial reconnaissance aircraft that featured all-metal construction, which included the coverings of both the fuselage and wings. The aircraft had an oval-section fuselage that was formed out of two areas, the fuselage proper and the engine support. The latter, which was composed of duralumin sheeting, was attached to the fuselage proper via four spherical fittings that were bolted to the forward ends of the longerons. The former was supported via a trellis girder arrangement, comprising varying thicknesses of duralumin, the uprights and diagonals of which were joined via simple riveted gussets to the longerons. Key attachment gussets were composed of high-resistance steel that greatly hindered the development of corrosion. The duralumin fuselage covering was directly secured to all primary structural members, providing great rigidity to the overall assembly; the fuselage was considered to be relatively strong for the era.

The exterior of the aircraft was covered by sheets of duralumin were used of a typical thickness of .35 mm (0.014 in.); this covering was stiffened using corrugated sections at intervals of 85 mm (3.35 in.), which had a height of about 10 mm (0.4 in.). Extensive testing was performed by Potez to determine that these proportions provided sufficient rigidity without overly increasing friction. The covering of the wing had numerous removable sections, both to permit inspection as well as to assist in repairs and maintenance, while the central section of the wing was attached via a rivets to the flanges of the spars, ribs, and cross pieces to constitute a rigid box girder that transmitted and shared stresses. These spars comprised a duralumin web and four steel corrugated angles for stiffening, the latter being relatively easy to uniformly construct, as well as being relatively resistant to rusting and vibrations alike. Both weight and construction time were minimised via the minimisation of both joints and riveting.

The Potez 39 had a parasol wing, the basic form of which was of an elongated rectangle with well-rounded tips, a feature which reportedly obtained the maximum achievable efficiency without resorting to a more complex wing design that incorporated multiple decreasing profiles. The flying performance of such a profile was thoroughly explored during comparative flight tests with both the Potez 31 and Potez 36. Lacking both dihedral or sweepback, the wing has an aspect ratio of 7.3. It was attached to the fuselage via an inverted V-shaped cabane strut along with a pair of struts of which the threaded ends permitted adjustment; cross-bracing via means of struts made the aircraft incapable of becoming out of adjustment. The internal structure of the wing comprised two spars with diagonal bracing (using duralumin half-tubes) and widely spaced ribs. The wing was equipped with sizable ailerons.

It was operated by a crew of two, a pilot and observer, that sat in tandem in open cockpits. The observer was armed with two Lewis guns on a ring mounting while the pilot was armed with a single synchronised Darne machine gun. Additional armaments comprised light bombs, which could be carried internally in a compact bomb bay as well as on external racks. Reconnaissance apparatus included a fixed camera that operated through a hatch in the fuselage floor.

The aircraft was powered by a single Hispano 12H, which produced 579 hp at 2,000 rpm. Cooling was provided by both a water radiator and an oil radiator. Two pumps were used to deliver fuel to the engine from a suspended conical-shaped fuel tank, which permitted fuel dumping even in the event of deformation due to battle damage. The fuel dumping mechanical was relatively simple, being stylised on that of a firearm. The aircraft was equipped with a conventional undercarriage. The main undercarriage, which had a track gauge of 3 m (9.84 ft.) and was furnished with wheel brakes, was of an axleless design that incorporated Potez's own elastic struts. The tail skid could be was easily inspected via a removable plate near the tail.

The tail unit of Potez 39 was directly attached to the sternpost, which was in turn carried by the aftermost frame of the fuselage frame; the rear of this sternpost supported the hinges of the unbalanced rudder while the front received the fin. The rear of the stabiliser was attached to a movable support that permitted mid-flight adjustments with relatively little force via an arrangement of flexible joints and ball bearings. The elevator, which was positioned in front of the rudder, was unbalanced, slightly tapered, and had well-rounded tips; its structure was akin to that of the wing as well as covered by duralumin.

== Operational history ==
Deliveries to the French Air Force began in August 1933 and continued until April 1935. The Potez 39 joined the French Air Force's Groupes d'Observation (GO), but from 1936, it was replaced in the GOs by more modern types, including the ANF Les Mureaux 117, Amiot 143 and Potez 540 aircraft, with the Potez 39s transferred to second-line Groupes Aériens Régionaux (GAR), which had the principal role of training reservists. In 1938, the GARs were redesignated Groupes Aériens d'Observation (GAO). In August 1938, during the Munich Crisis, General Joseph Vuillemin, Chief of Staff of the French Air Force, gave orders that, in the event of war breaking out, obsolescent observation aircraft such as the Potez 39 should never cross the front line. At the outbreak of the Second World War, the Potez 39 was in service with seven GAOs, which despite their age and Vuillemin's 1938 instructions, were deployed on operational missions. The Potez 39 proved to be vulnerable to German fighters, however, and in October 1939, the units equipped with the Potez 39 and the equally outdated Breguet 27, were withdrawn from use at the front. The Potez 39 continued to be used for liaison and casualty evacuation duties until the Battle of France concluded with the armistice of June 1940, at which point 41 aircraft reportedly remained in Metropolitan France. These aircraft were deemed to be obsolete and thus were scrapped shortly thereafter.

Twelve Lorraine Pétrel-powered Potez 391s were purchased by Peru in 1933, during the Leticia War with Colombia, with the purchase being funded by popular subscription, but they only entered service early in 1935, after the war had ended. The outbreak of the Second World War stopped deliveries of spare parts and technical assistance from France, and the type was phased out from active service.

== Variants ==
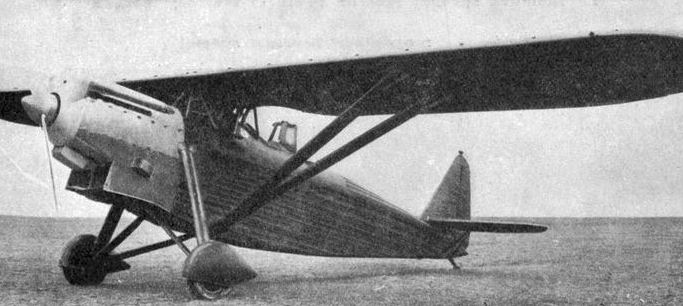
Potez 391 photo from L'Aerophile November 1934

Potez 37
Two seat reconnaissance aircraft developed in parallel with Potez 39, with narrow tail boom replacing conventional rear fuselage. Unsuccessful, with only three built, the ANF-Les Mureaux 110 being preferred.
Potez 390 A2
Two-seat observation aircraft for French Air Force. Powered by a Hispano-Suiza 12Hb engine.
Potez 39 Hy
Experimental floatplane version.
Potez 391
Variant of Potez 39 powered by 390 kW (520 hp) Lorraine-Dietrich 12H. 12 production versions built for Peru.
Potez 3910 R2
Experimental aircraft with 640 kW (860 hp) Hispano-Suiza 12Ybrs engine. One built.
Potez 3912
Experimental aircraft with 400 kW (540 hp) Renault 12 Jc engine. One built.
Potez 392
A single prototype initially built with a 380 kW (510 hp) Hispano-Suiza 12Kb, later re-engined with a 510 kW (680 hp) Hispano-Suiza 12Xbr
Potez 393
A single prototype powered by a 520 kW (700 hp) Hispano-Suiza 12Ybr

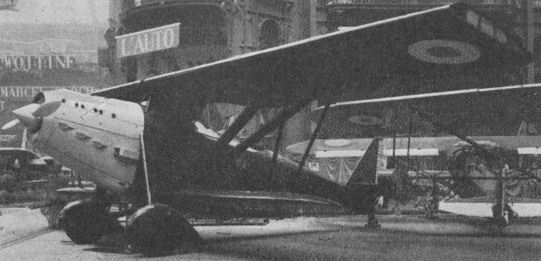
Potez 49 photo from L'Aerophile December 1932

Potez 49
Sesquiplane conversion of Potez 39. The lower wing was designed to be easily removable, so the aircraft could be configured either as a monoplane or a biplane, according to mission. One built.

== Operators ==
France

- French Air Force

Peru

- Peruvian Air Force

Soviet Union

- Soviet Air Force - One aircraft, used for tests and trials.

== Specifications ==
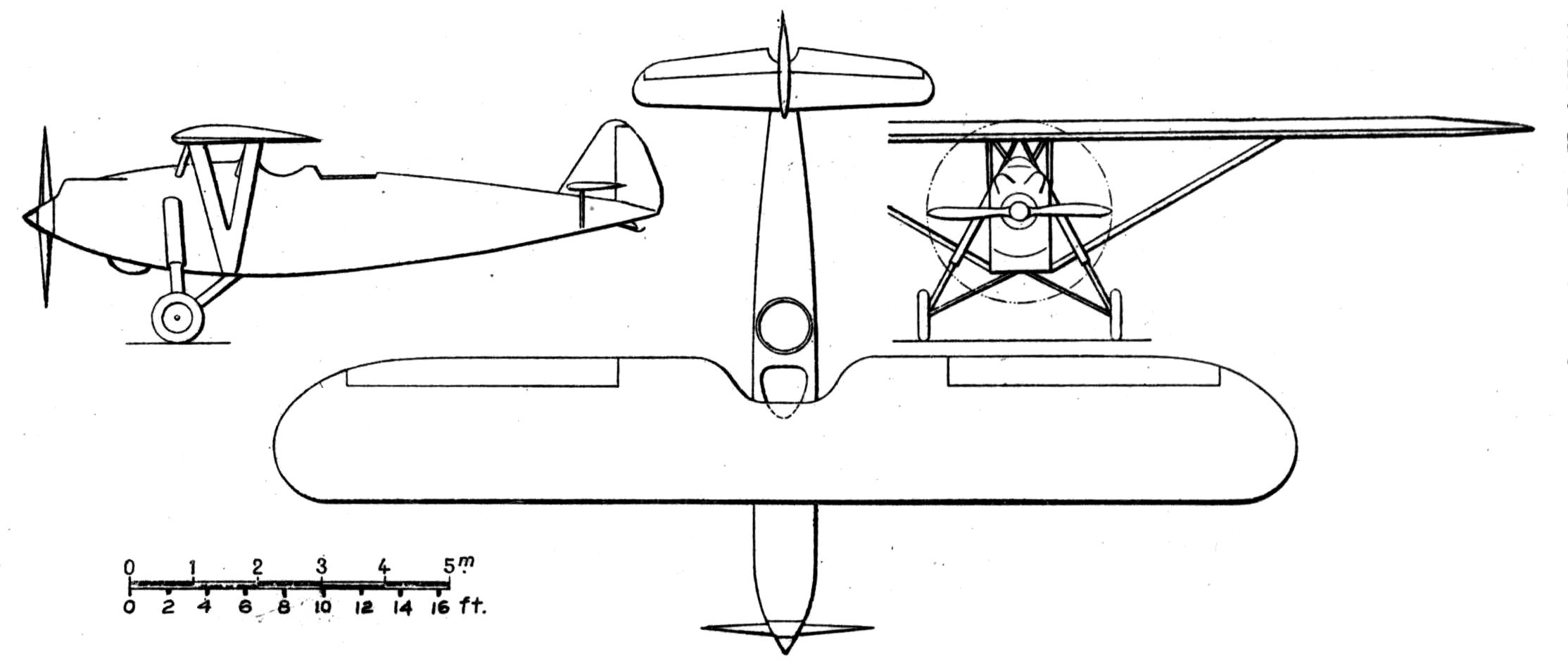
Potez 39 3-view drawing from NACA Aircraft Circular No.114

Data from L'Aviation française de 1939 à 1942, Tome 2

General characteristics

- Crew: 2
- Length: 10 m (32 ft 10 in)
- Wingspan: 16 m (52 ft 6 in)
- Height: 3.4 m (11 ft 2 in)
- Wing area: 35.0 m^{2} (377 sq ft)
- Empty weight: 1,492 kg (3,289 lb)
- Gross weight: 2,250 kg (4,960 lb)
- Powerplant: 1 × Hispano-Suiza 12H V-12 water-cooled piston engine, 433 kW (581 hp)
- Propellers: 2-bladed fixed-pitch propeller

Performance

- Maximum speed: 249 km/h (155 mph, 134 kn) at 3,500 m (11,483 ft)
- Range: 800 km (500 mi, 430 nmi)
- Service ceiling: 7,000 m (23,000 ft)
- Time to altitude: 3,500 m (11,483 ft) in nine minutes

Armament

- Guns:
  - 1 x 7.7 mm machine-gun firing forward, fixed
  - 2 x 7.7 mm machine-guns in observer's position, flexible
- Bombs: up to 120 kg (260 lb)

== See also ==
Related lists

- List of Interwar military aircraft
