= Robert Wyman =

Robert Wyman may refer to:

- Robert Wyman (ice hockey) (1909–1978), British ice hockey player
- Robert H. Wyman (1822–1882), U.S. Navy officer
- W. Robert Wyman (1930–2007), Canadian businessman and chancellor of the University of British Columbia
- Robert Andrew Wyman (1904–1967), Canadian Army officer
