= Latécoère 490 =

French reconnaissance aircraft prototype of 1931

490
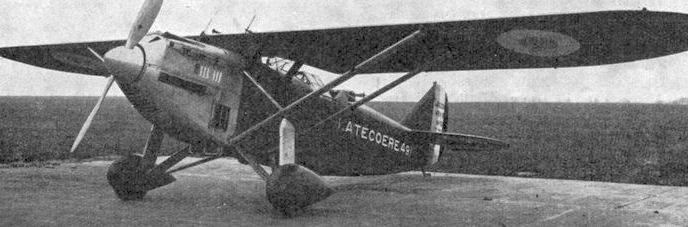
- 491

General information
- Type: Reconnaissance
- National origin: France
- Manufacturer: Latécoère
- Designer: Marcel Moine
- Number built: 2

History
- First flight: March 1931

The Latécoère 490 was a two-seat, single-engined parasol winged aircraft, designed to a French photographic reconnaissance specification of 1928. Only two prototypes were built.

== Design and development ==
The French specification R.2 of 1928 called for a two-seat reconnaissance aircraft, fast and with a rapid climb rate and large radius of action. It led to prototypes from eight manufacturers, the Amiot 130, Breguet 33, Latécoère 490, Les Mureaux 111, Nieuport-Delage Ni-D 580, Potez 37, Wibault 260 and the Weymann WEL-80 R.2. The Latécoère 490 was originally known and painted as the 49.0. The second prototype was the 491, previously 49.1.

The parasol wing of the 490 was of straight, untapered plan apart from elliptical tips. For its time the all-metal wing was thin, with a thickness/chord ratio of 8.5%, and was built up around two spars. The ailerons were split into two pairs. Streamlined lift struts ran from the lower fuselage longerons to about mid-span, assisted by two pairs of outward leaning centre section struts.

The fuselage was constructed around four longerons and entirely metal covered. The water-cooled V-12, 650 hp Hispano-Suiza 12 Nb reached aft almost to the wing leading edge, and behind it the depth of the fuselage decreased only slightly to the tail. The pilot sat on the line of the trailing edge, below a deep cut-out for visibility. He had control of two Vickers machine guns mounted on either side of the top of the engine cowling. The vertical and oblique cameras were immediately behind the pilot and just in front of the observer, who had a radio station at his rear. His position was armed with twin Lewis guns, mounted so they could be rotated and moved in elevation through 360°. A third Lewis gun fired in a rearward direction through a ventral trapdoor. The tailplane was mounted on top of the fuselage and together with the elevators was elliptical in plan. The elevators carried trim tabs. In its initial configuration the fin was longer in chord than high, carrying a nearly semicircular rudder that extended down through a cut out in the elevators to the base of the fuselage.

The vertical, faired main oleo legs of the split axle undercarriage were mounted on the forward lift struts, with two more articulated struts on each side to the bases of the lift struts. The single mainwheel on each side was initially uncovered but later acquired spats. There was a tail skid at the rear.

The Latécoère 490 first flew in March 1931, piloted by Louis Perriot. At the end of April 1931 it went to Villacoublay for official tests and comparison with its competitors. It was found to be fast, but judged lacking yaw stability. In October the 490 crashed on take off due to fuel starvation, though it was not badly damaged, and Latécoère took the opportunity to increase the fin area during the repairs. The new fin had the shape of an equilateral right angled triangle, and the now deeper rudder was slightly reduced in chord. At that point it was registered as F-AKDD before returning to Villacoublay to complete the tests early in 1932. It was the fastest machine in level flight, though the ANF Les Mureaux 113 climbed faster. The only criticisms were of the high take off and landing speeds. Encouraged, and very optimistic of orders, Latécoère built a second prototype numbered 491, very similar to the (revised) first prototype apart from some refinement to the shape of the engine cowling and spinner and a repositioning of the oil radiator. It was a little (5 km/h) faster than the 490 and was over 3% quicker in the climb. Despite its excellent performance in terms of the original specification and its ability to perform aerobatics like a fighter, the production order went to Les Mureaux on the basis of their machine's superior climb rate.

No more aircraft of the 490 series were built; the number 492 was a proposed, unbuilt version with a glazed gunner's enclosure. The 493 may have existed, unofficially, as the type 491 re-engined with a supercharged Hispano-Suiza 12 X, but neither this nor the fate of either prototype is certain.

== Specifications (490, unmodified) ==
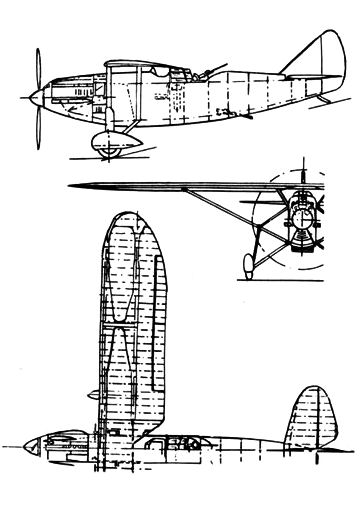
Late 491 3-view drawing from L'Aerophile March 1933

Data from Cuny 1992, pp. 247

General characteristics

- Crew: 2
- Length: 9.70 m (31 ft 10 in)
- Wingspan: 14.60 m (47 ft 11 in)
- Height: 2.90 m (9 ft 6 in)
- Empty weight: 1,798 kg (3,964 lb)
- Gross weight: 2,571 kg (5,668 lb)
- Powerplant: 1 × Hispano-Suiza 12 Nb V-12 watercooled piston, 480 kW (650 hp)
- Propellers: 2-bladed Ratier 9400, 3.10 m (10 ft 2 in) diameter

Performance

- Maximum speed: 275 km/h (171 mph, 148 kn) at sea level
- Range: 1,860 km (1,160 mi, 1,000 nmi)
- Service ceiling: 7,800 m (25,600 ft)
- Rate of climb: 4.61 m/s (907 ft/min) to 5,000 m (16,400 ft)

Armament

- 2× 7.7 mm (0.303 in) fixed Vickers machine guns
- 2× 7.7 mm (0.303 in) TO 7 "tourelle" mounted Lewis machine guns in observer's cockpit
- 1× 7.7 mm (0.303 in) moveable, rearward firing ventral Lewis gun
