= John Clyne =

Canadian judge (1902–1989)

- Born: February 14, 1902; Vancouver, British Columbia
- Died: August 22, 1989 (aged 87); Vancouver, British Columbia
- Education: University of British Columbia (BA '23)
- Spouse: Ventris Ann Somerset (m. 1927)

John Valentine Clyne CC (14 February 1902 – 22 August 1989) was a Canadian lawyer and former Justice of the British Columbia Supreme Court.

Born in Vancouver, British Columbia he attended the University of British Columbia and graduated in 1923. He was called to the British Columbia bar in 1927. He was appointed to the Supreme Court of British Columbia in 1950. In 1957 he was appointed a director of MacMillan Bloedel and later served as chairman and chief executive officer until his retirement in 1973. He was appointed Chancellor of the University of British Columbia in 1978 and served for six years. He was awarded an honorary degree from UBC in 1984.

In 1972 he was made a Companion of the Order of Canada.

== Works ==
- Clyne, J. V. Jack of All Trades: Memoires of a Busy Life. McClelland and Stewart, 1985.

Academic offices
| Preceded by Donovan F. Miller | Chancellor of the University of British Columbia; 1978–1984 | Succeeded by W. Robert Wyman |
