= Morrill Wyman =

American physician

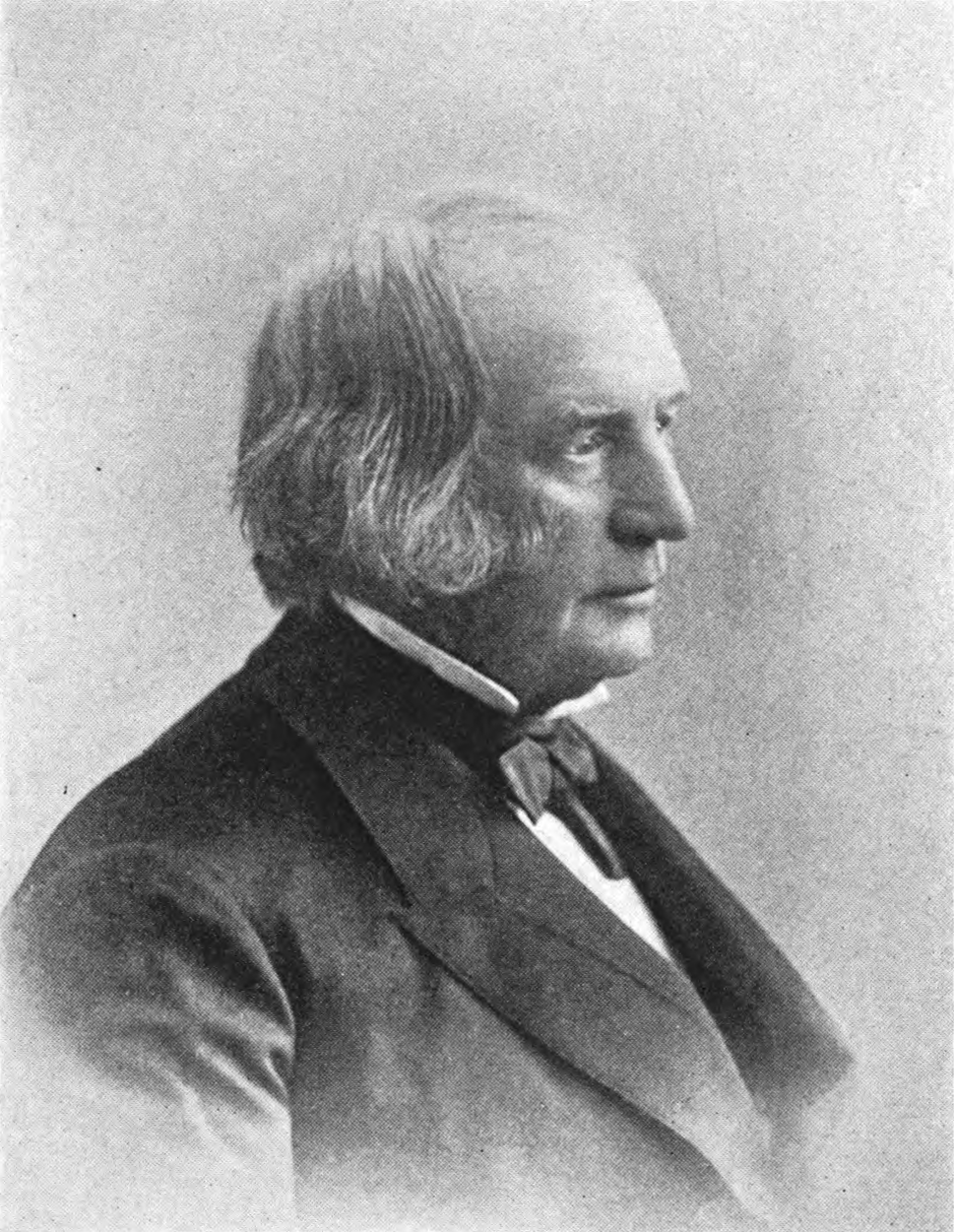
- Born: July 25, 1812; Chelmsford
- Died: January 30, 1903 (aged 90); Cambridge
- Resting place: Mount Auburn Cemetery
- Alma mater: Harvard Medical School; Harvard College
- Occupation: Medical doctor
- Parent(s): Rufus Wyman

Signature
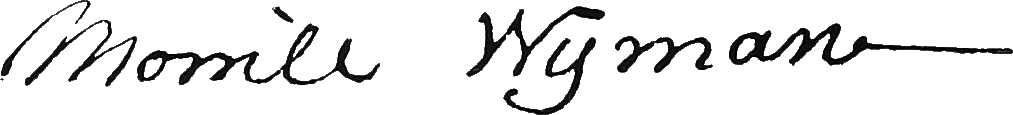

Morrill Wyman (July 25, 1812 in Chelmsford, Massachusetts – January 30, 1903 in Cambridge, Massachusetts) was an American physician and social reformer. Best known today for his work on hay fever, he was one of the most respected doctors of his time, a social reformer, Harvard overseer, hospital president, and author in his long lifetime.

== Early life ==
Wyman was the son of Dr. Rufus Wyman, the first director of the McLean Asylum, and Elizabeth Morrill. He and his brother Jeffries Wyman (later first curator of the Peabody Museum of Archaeology and Ethnology at Harvard) graduated from Harvard in 1833 and received medical degrees in 1837. Another brother, Edward Wyman (1818 - 1899), was a prominent merchant and the captain of the Ancient and Honorable Artillery Company of Massachusetts.

== Career ==
Wyman established a medical practice in Cambridge which he continued for over fifty years. Early in his career Wyman became interested in ventilation and became an expert on the ventilation of sickrooms and public buildings. A paper on the subject won an award from the Massachusetts Medical Society, and he published a book on the subject in 1846.

He also devised a method and device for removing excess fluid from the chest cavity (1850). During the Civil War he served on a Sanitary Committee that inspected army medical facilities, being considered too old and too busy of a doctor to send to the front lines. After the Civil War Wyman became interested in hay fever, which he and members of his family suffered from, and he conducted experiments that convinced him that ragweed was a cause of what he called "Autumnal Cattarh"; gathering data from correspondents, he published the first pollen maps of the United States so that sufferers could plan vacations in low pollen areas.

In 1850, Wyman performed the first recorded thoracentesis, later described by Henry Ingersoll Bowditch after performing the procedure on one of Bowditch's patients the same year.

Wyman lectured on medical subjects for many years, both at a private medical school that he and his brother Jeffries conducted in Boston and at Harvard, where he served as interim professor of anatomy from 1853 to 1856. He took a special interest in the Harvard Medical School during his terms as a Harvard overseer (1875–1887). He was a member of the American Academy of Arts and Sciences.

Wyman also served as president of Cambridge Hospital (now Mount Auburn Hospital) during the construction of its first building; a building at the hospital now bears his name. During his long career as a physician, he treated many prominent patients, including Henry Wadsworth Longfellow, Theodore Roosevelt, Charles Eliot, and Louis Agassiz. After formally closing his practice in 1892 (although he continued to see devoted patients for many years after that), Wyman wrote an article and later a book on the life of Daniel Treadwell, inventor and Harvard professor, who had been a friend of Wyman's.

== Corporal punishment ==
The whipping of a sixteen-year-old girl named Josephine Foster in a Cambridge school in 1866 gave Wyman a new cause. Convinced that it was harmful to use corporal punishment on young women and girls, Wyman led a petition drive, spoke and wrote on the subject, and ultimately served terms on the Cambridge School Board. He soon allied with others such as Bostonian John P. Ordway who wished to ban corporal punishment in public schools for both sexes. Wyman testified at a hearing in 1868 on a bill to abolish all corporal punishment in public schools in Massachusetts - a bill which passed the lower house of the General Court but failed in the Senate. (Corporal punishment in public schools was ultimately prohibited by law in Massachusetts in 1972.) His efforts did not lead to a long-standing ban on corporal punishment in Cambridge schools, but increased public awareness of it, and new reporting requirements probably reduced it considerably.

== Personal life ==
Wyman married Elizabeth Aspinwall Pulsifer, the orphan daughter of a ship's captain. They had four children. His son Morrill Wyman Jr. wrote a short book on the lives of his father and grandfather; it was published privately not long before he died in 1913.

== Publications ==
- 1846: Practical Treatise on Ventilation via Internet Archive
- 1863: The Reality and Certainty of Medicine: An address delivered at the annual meeting of the Massachusetts Medical Society, June 17, 1863
- 1867: Progress in School Discipline: Corporal Punishment in the Public Schools
- 1872: Autumnal Catarrh
- 1877: The Early History of the McLean Asylum for the Insane: A criticism of the report of the Massachusetts State Board of Health for 1877
- 1887: Memoir of Daniel Treadwell
