= Jeffries Wyman =

American anatomist (1814–1874)

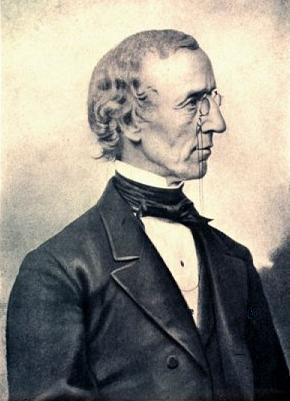
- Born: August 11, 1814; Chelmsford, Massachusetts, U.S.
- Died: September 4, 1874 (aged 60); Bethlehem, New Hampshire, U.S.
- Occupations: College professor and museum curator
- Known for: Parkman–Webster murder case

Academic background
- Education: Harvard College; Harvard Medical School

Academic work
- Discipline: Medicine
- Sub-discipline: Anatomy
- Institutions: Harvard Medical School Peabody Museum of Archaeology and Ethnology
- Notable students: Burt G. Wilder

Jeffries Wyman (August 11, 1814 – September 4, 1874) was an American anatomist, curator, and professor. He was the first curator of the Peabody Museum of Archaeology and Ethnology and taught anatomy at Harvard Medical School from 1847 to 1874.

== Early life ==
Wyman was born in Chelmsford, Massachusetts in 1814. His father, Rufus Wyman, was the first director of the McLean Asylum.

Wyman attended Phillips Exeter Academy. He graduated Harvard College in 1833 and Harvard Medical School in 1837.

== Career ==
He was made curator at Lowell Institute, Boston, in 1839 and remained affiliated there until 1842. Fees from Lowell Institute lectures enabled him to study in Europe, from 1841 to 1842, where he learned from anatomist Richard Owen in London. In addition to studying with Owen, Wyman also attended lectures by Achille Valenciennes, Isidore Geoffroy Saint-Hilaire, Marie Jean Pierre Flourens, and Etienne Serres in Paris.

Upon his return to the United States, Wyman hoped to gain a professorship at Harvard College but the position went to Asa Gray. In 1843, he was elected professor of anatomy and physiology at Hampden-Sydney College in Richmond, Virginia. In a series of letters written between 1843 and 1848 to his Boston friend and fellow medical doctor, David Humphreys Storer, Wyman revealed his unhappiness with the quality of the school, the treatment of the professors, and life in the South. He wrote, "As soon as circumstances will permit I shall make my way back to the glorious city of Boston, the like of which exists not on the face of the earth."

In 1847, Wyman became Hersey Professor of Anatomy at Harvard College, where he remained until his death. He was also the first curator of the Peabody Museum of Archaeology and Ethnology, holding that position until 1874. He made extensive and valuable collections in comparative anatomy and archæology and published nearly seventy scientific papers. With American physician and missionary Thomas Staughton Savage, he was the first to scientifically describe the gorilla.

Although he did not achieve the fame of some of his contemporaries, he was respected by his peers: "In his special branches his authority was recognized the world over." In 1866, he was elected as a member of the American Philosophical Society. Wyman was elected a member of the American Antiquarian Society in 1868. He was the president of the American Association for the Advancement of Science in 1858.

After Wyman's death, his former student Burt G. Wilder eulogized him as "regarded by all as the highest anatomical authority in America, and the compeer of Owen, Huxley, and Gegenbauer in the Old World."

== Parkman–Webster murder case ==
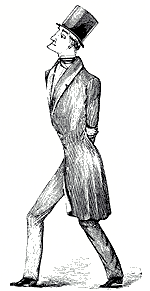
George Parkman, "The Pedestrian".

In 1850, Wyman was called to testify for the prosecution in the Parkman–Webster murder case, where Dr. John White Webster was on trial for the murder of Dr. George Parkman. Wyman's recognized authority as a comparative anatomist caused the coroner, Jabez Pratt, to call upon him to examine and testify about bones found in a furnace in November 1849. He cataloged them and noted that the fragments belonged to a single body; his testimony regarding the jawbone contributed to the belief that the bones belonged to Parkman. Wyman also testified about the alleged bloodstains found on pantaloons and slippers belonging to Webster.

Parkman's gaunt figure was known on the streets of Boston. A sketch of Dr. Parkman as he was last seen was published in the New York Globe's account of the trial. While the bones could not be definitively identified as Dr. Parkman, Wyman contributed to the belief that they were Parkman's by providing the court with a "diagram, exhibiting the position in the skeleton, of the bones found and showing, (in some degree,) what would be necessary to complete the body." This rendering was remarkably similar to the sketch of Parkman striding and was labeled "Restoration of Dr. Parkman's Skeleton," no doubt influencing the jury.

Coincidentally, Wyman's brother, Dr. Morrill Wyman, and his wife, had spent the evening of Parkman's disappearance with Webster and his wife at the home of Harvard professor Daniel Treadwell.

== Views on evolution ==
Wyman was a theist who attended the Unitarian Church at Harvard and, as such, leaned toward a belief in a "theistic, morphological form of evolution rather than natural selection." Two science historians who chronicled Wyman's career, A. Hunter Dupree and Toby Appel, disagreed as to Wyman's reception of Charles Darwin's theories of evolution and natural selection. Dupree believed that Wyman's religious beliefs caused him to struggle with Darwin's theories, accepting them "only by intense effort both as a scientist and a person."

Appel believed that Wyman had no difficulty accepting Darwin's theory of evolution but that his work in philosophical anatomy made it "doubtful that he ever accepted natural selection." Appel made a case for Wyman as a proponent of philosophical anatomy at Harvard, along with his colleagues Louis Agassiz and Asa Gray. Philosophical anatomy, also known as transcendental anatomy, was the "search for ideal patterns of structure in nature." This search did not prevent Wyman and Gray from accepting evolution, although Agassiz never did. However, unlike Gray, Wyman could not accept natural selection as the method of evolution, believing instead in evolution as "directed by the Creator."

When Darwin's On the Origin of Species was published in 1859, Wyman's one-time mentor, Richard Owen came out against the book, while his colleague Asa Gray supported it. In 1860, Darwin went to Gray to enlist Wyman's support, due to Wyman's work on higher apes and anatomy. Wyman wrote to Darwin agreeing that "progressive development is a far more probable theory than progressive creations". The two men corresponded between 1860 and 1866, with Darwin writing at one point, "I know hardly anyone whose opinions I should be more inclined to defer to."

== Personal life ==
Wyman married Adeline Wheelwright in 1850. They had two daughters, Mary and Susan, before Adeline died in 1855. In 1861, he married Annie Williams Whitney, with whom he had a son, Jeffries Wyman Jr. Whitney died in 1864, the year of their son's birth.

Wyman died in Bethlehem, New Hampshire of a pulmonary hemorrhage on September 4, 1874. In 1978, the Peabody Museum published Dear Jeffie, a collection of letters and sketches that Wyman had written to his son from 1866 to 1874 when he was doing fieldwork in the states and abroad.

His brother Morrill Wyman was a respected Cambridge doctor. His grandson, also named Jeffries Wyman (1901–1995), was a molecular biologist, biophysicist, and professor at Harvard.

== Selected publications ==
- Wyman, Jeffries; "Chapter VII - Observations upon the Mammalian Remains of Extinct and Existing Species found in the Crevices of the Lead-bearing Rock, and in the Superficial Accumulations within the Lead Region of Wisconsin and Iowa" in Geological Survey of State of Wisconsin, vol. 1, 1862.
- Wyman, Jeffries; “Fossil Mammels” - “The U.S. Naval Astronomical Expedition to the Southern Hemisphere During the Years 1849-‘50-‘51-‘52: Volume II.”
