= Weyman Bouchery =

Weyman Bouchery (1683–1712) was a Latin poet from the Kingdom of England.

Bouchery was the son of Arnold Bouchery, one of the ministers of the Walloon congregation at Canterbury. He was born in Canterbury in 1683, and educated at The King's School, Canterbury and Jesus College, Cambridge (B.A. 1702, M.A. 1706). He appears to have migrated to Emmanuel College in 1705. He became rector of Little Blakenham in Suffolk in 1709, and died at Ipswich on 24 March 1712. A mural tablet to his memory was erected in the church of St. George, Canterbury, by his son, Gilbert Bouchery, vicar of Swaffham, Norfolk. He published an elegant Latin poem, Hymnus Sacer: sive Paraphrasis in Deboræ et Baraci Canticum, Alcaico carmine expressa, e libri Judicum cap. v., Cambridge, typis academicis, 1706, 4to.
