= Weyman =

Weyman is both a surname and a given name. Notable people with the name include:

- Andrew D. Weyman, American television director and producer
- Daniel Weyman (born 1977), English actor
- Michael Weyman (born 1984), Australian rugby league footballer
- Stanley J. Weyman (1855–1928), English novelist
- Stanley Clifford Weyman (1890–1960), American multiple impostor
- Weyman Bouchery (1683–1712), English Latin poet
