= Rufus Wyman =

American physician (1778–1842)

Rufus Wyman (1778–1842) was an American medical doctor. He was the first medical doctor and superintendent of the Asylum for the Insane, renamed in 1823 to McLean Hospital, part of the Massachusetts General Hospital system, and the first mental hospital in the state.

== Early life ==
Wyman was born into a middle-class family in Woburn, Massachusetts, whose forebears had arrived in the state in the mid-seventeenth century. He received his early education at the local school, and then graduated from Westford Academy. He entered Harvard College in 1795 and graduated with from its medical school in 1799. He spent a year teaching school before starting his medical training with Samuel Brown and John Jeffries. He practiced with Jeffries for one year then moved to Chelmsford, Massachusetts where he established his practice. He was appointed a justice of the peace and came to be known as a compassionate and intelligent physician. He married in 1810 and the family grew to four sons and one daughter. Wyman was elected a Fellow of the American Academy of Arts and Sciences in 1812.

== Career at asylum ==
In Boston, a group of prominent citizens planned to establish a hospital to include an asylum for the insane since only one almshouse provided care. A corporation was formed, a charter was received from the State legislature, and fund raising was undertaken. An estate was purchased in Charleston to house the asylum. The mansion became the superintendents’ residence. The Trustees appointed Wyman as the first superintendent and physician of the asylum. Before taking office, the Trustees sent Wyman to New York and Philadelphia to inspect the existing asylums at New York Hospital and the Pennsylvania Hospital.

Wyman and his family moved to his new post in 1818. Wyman was the only physician at the asylum for 17 years. An assistant physician was appointed who helped in the apothecary to distribute medicine, maintained medical records, and visited patients daily. In 1823, the Trustees appointed a steward to take over the business duties of the asylum which allowed Wyman to carry on as physician.

Wyman had become acquainted with moral reformers’ treatment instituted at the Retreat at York, an asylum run by the Quaker community and William Tuke. Wyman instituted Tuke's treatment at the Asylum for the Insane. He added occupation and recreation therapies for patients, and limited or removed the use of restraints. At times, patients shared meals with Wyman's family in the mansion.

The number of patients to the Asylum for the Insane gradually increased. By 1821, 146 patients had been admitted. The growing need for more patient space led the Trustees to build additions and new houses. The opening of the Worcester State Hospital in 1833 directed indigent patients there, thus allowing McLean to admit more affluent patients which improved its finances.

== Publications ==
Wyman wrote several professional papers, other than his annual reports for the hospital's Trustees. In 1816, he anonymously published a pamphlet titled “Remarks on the Observations of the Lord’s Day.” In 1830, he gave the annual address to the Massachusetts Medical Society titled “A Discourse on Mental Philosophy as Connected to Mental Disease.”

In 1832, Wyman suffered from poor health and tendered his resignation from the hospital. He returned to McLean for three more years, and in 1835, retired to Roxbury with his family. He died in 1842 of a lung affection.

Wyman's legacy was to leave an institution that became a leader in the treatment of mental illness in the United States during the nineteenth century. He was succeeded by his assistant, who served for only a year, then Dr. Luther V. Bell, who served as superintendent to the McLean Asylum from 1837 to 1855, and became a leader in psychiatry.

== Personal life ==
Wyman married Anne Morrill (1784-1843), daughter of a prosperous merchant. Their sons Morrill (1812-1903) and Jeffries (1814-1874) both trained as doctors; Morrill was a prominent physician who was active in his community, while Jeffries became a naturalist and the first curator of the Peabody Museum of Archaeology and Ethnology.

== Bibliography ==
- Wyman, Rufus. Address of the Trustees of the Massachusetts General Hospital, to the Subscribers and to the Public. [Boston, 1822].
- Wyman, Rufus. A Discourse on Mental Philosophy as Connected with Mental Disease: Delivered before the Massachusetts Medical Society, June 2, 1830. Boston: Daily Advertiser, 1830. A discourse on mental philosophy as connected with mental disease: delivered before the Massachusetts Medical Society, June 2, 1830 - Digital Collections - National Library of Medicine
- Wyman, Morrill. A Brief Record of the Lives and Writings of Dr. Rufus Wyman (1778-1842) and his son Dr. Morrill Wyman (1812-1903). Cambridge, MA: Riverside Press, 1913.
