= Wyman =

Wyman may refer to:

== People with the surname Wyman ==
- Wyman (surname)

== People with the given or middle name Wyman ==
- Artemas Wyman Sawyer (1827–1907), American Baptist minister
- David Wyman Patten (1799–1838), American missionary, leader of the Latter Day Saint movement
- Wyman B. S. Moor (1811–1869), American politician
- Wyman Guin (1915–1989), science fiction writer
- Wyman Spooner (1795–1877), Lieutenant Governor of Wisconsin, United States
- Wyman Wong (1969– ), Hong Kong lyricist, fashion columnist, stylist, DJ, actor

== Fictional characters ==
- Wyman Ford, a character in many novels by Douglas Preston
- Wyman Manderly, bannerman to House Stark and Lord of White Harbor in the A Song of Ice and Fire book series and Game of Thrones television series by George R.R. Martin

== Geography ==
- Mount Wyman
- Wyman, Arkansas
- Wyman, Kentucky
- Wyman's Brook, a district in the north-west of Cheltenham, Gloucestershire, England, United Kingdom
- Wyman, Maine, an unorganized territory in the United States
- Wyman, Michigan, unorganized community in Home Township, Montcalm County, Michigan, United States

== Ships ==
- USNS Wyman, survey ship of the U.S. Navy
- USS Wyman, destroyer of the U.S. Navy

== Schools ==
- Wyman School in Excelsior Springs, Missouri
