= W. Robert Wyman =

- Born: 4 December 1930; Edmonton, Alberta
- Died: 11 June 2007 (aged 76); Vancouver, British Columbia
- Education: University of British Columbia (BCom 1956)
- Spouse: Dorothy Taylor (m. 1954)

William Robert Wyman CM (4 December 1930 – 11 June 2007) was a Canadian businessman and Chancellor of the University of British Columbia from 1984 to 1987.

Born in Edmonton, Alberta, Wyman received a Bachelor of Commerce degree from the University of British Columbia in 1956. He started his career as an analyst in the investment department of Canada Life Assurance Company. In 1962, he joined Pemberton Securities Inc. as a manager in the research department. He would rise to become president and CEO in 1975 and chairman in 1982. From 1991 to 1992, he was chairman and CEO of B.C. Hydro and Power Authority. He was also a Vice Chairman and Director of RBC Dominion Securities. From 1984 to 1987, he was the Chancellor of the University of British Columbia.

In 2003, he was made a Member of the Order of Canada in recognition for being "a prominent advocate for corporate social responsibility".

Academic offices
Preceded by John Clyne	Chancellor of the University of British Columbia; 1984–1987	Succeeded by Leslie Peterson
