= Hispano-Suiza 12N =

1920s French aircraft engine

12N
- Type: V-12
- National origin: France
- Manufacturer: Société Francaise Hispano-Suiza
- Designer: Marc Birkigt
- First run: 1928
- Variants: Hispano-Suiza 18R

The Hispano-Suiza 12N was one of two new V-12 engine designs first run in 1928 and was manufactured by Hispano-Suiza's French subsidiary for the Armée de l’Air. It produced about 485 kW (650 hp), was the first to use gas nitride hardening and introduced wet cylinder liners into Hispano-Suiza's aircraft engine range. It powered the first non-stop flight from Europe to the United States.

== Design and development ==
Up to 1927, Hispano-Suiza's many engine types, of various layouts and cylinder numbers, were all recognisable developments of the World War I V-8 Hispano-Suiza 8. 1927-8 saw the introduction of four completely new engines, two V-12s and two with six cylinders inline. The Hispano-Suiza 12N, known by the manufacturers as the Type 61, was the larger of the V-12s, with a displacement of 36 L (2,200 cu in), the other being the 27 L (1,600 cu in) 12M. Apart from capacity and power, these two engines had much in common. The 12M first ran in 1927 and the 12N a year later.

Both 12M and 12N were 60° V engines with carburettors, inlets and exhausts on the outer faces. There were three carburettors per bank, each charging a pair of cylinders. Much of the new technology was in the cylinder design: these types introduced wet liners, an Hispano automobile engine innovation which brought the cooling water into direct contact with the steel cylinder barrel rather than through a screwed-in aluminium water jacket. This improved cooling, simplified assembly and allowed larger cylinder bores without increasing their separation. The cylinder barrels were open at top and bottom and threaded for screwing into the block only near the top, with valve seats ground into the aluminium cylinder head. The lower end of the barrel extended into the crankcase, simplifying both manufacture and assembly. Block and crankcase were bolted together.

The 12M and 12N engines were the first to use the gas nitriding surface-hardening process on the cylinder walls, which reduced both wear and oil consumption. They also used a novel, complicated but effective method of main bearing cooling, enhancing the local lubricant flow without requiring high overall oil pump speeds.

Both types were designed so that epicyclic gearing could be added or removed quickly; some earlier Hispano-Suiza engines offered gearing but as a permanent fixture on a specific sub-type. The gears added 45 kg (99 lb) to the weight. In 1935 the 12Ner variant was fitted with an in-flight electrically operated variable pitch propeller.

The 12N series was developed into the 12Y (Type 73) supercharged engine, first run in 1932.

== Operational history ==
A Hispano-Suiza 12Nb powered the Breguet XIX Point d'Interrogation on the first non-stop flight from Paris to New York in September 1930. This was the first east to west flight between Europe and the United States, rather than to the North American continent.

In the early 1930s, 12N engines powered the flying boats operating the French Atlantic and African routes.

The Swiss government, in the form of the KTA (Kriegstechninischen Abteilung or War Technical Department) purchased construction licences for the 12Nb and in 1932 eighty units were built at the Saurer lorry factory.

== Variants ==
Data from Hispano Suiza in Aeronautics.

12Nb/650
Compression ratio 6.2, maximum power 560 kW (750 hp) at 2,100 rpm.
12Nbr/650
Compression ratio 6.2, maximum power 550 kW (740 hp) at 2,100 rpm. Gearing ratio of 2:1 or 1.61:1.
12Ns
Compression ratio 7, nominal power 670 kW (900 hp) at 2,200 rpm. For Schneider Cup 1928.
12Nsr
Compression ratio 10, nominal power 745 kW (999 hp) at 2,400 rpm. For Schneider Cup 1931. Farman compressor.
12Nc
Compression ratio 6.2, nominal power 533 kW (715 hp) at 2,000 rpm. For Ford 14A Trimotor.
12Ncr
12Ndr
Electrically controlled pitch propeller, anti-clockwise turning (1935).
12Ner
As 12Ndr, modified with articulated connecting rods.
12Nfr
As Ndr, clockwise turning.
12Ngr
As Ner, clockwise turning.

== Applications ==
- Amiot 130
- Amiot 140
- Avia B-34
- Bernard H.V.41
- Bernard H.V.42
- Bernard 80 & 81
- Blackburn Ripon IIF (one series III aircraft)
- Blériot 5190
- Breguet XIX Point d'Interrogation
- Breguet 330
- CAMS 58.3
- Couzinet 70
- Farman F.302
- Latécoère 28
- Latécoère 290
- Latécoère 300 and 301
- Latécoère 381
- Latécoère 440
- Latécoère 490
- Latécoère 521
- Letov Š-616
- Levasseur PL.14
- Levasseur PL.15
- Lioré et Olivier LeO 25.8
- Westland Wapiti IV (uncertain if completed with 14N)

== Specifications (12Nbr/650) ==
Data from Hispano-Suiza in Aeronautics

=== General characteristics ===
- Type: V-12, water cooled
- Bore: 150 mm (5.90 in)
- Stroke: 170 mm (6.69 in)
- Displacement: 36.0 L (2,197 cu in)
- Dry weight: 520 kg (1146 lb)

=== Components ===
- Reduction gear: 2:1

=== Performance ===
- Power output: (normal) 550 kW (740 hp) at 2,000 rpm
- Compression ratio: 6.2

== See also ==
Comparable engines

- Rolls-Royce Buzzard

Related lists

- List of aircraft engines
