= Oleo strut =

Type of shock absorbing landing gear strut on aircraft

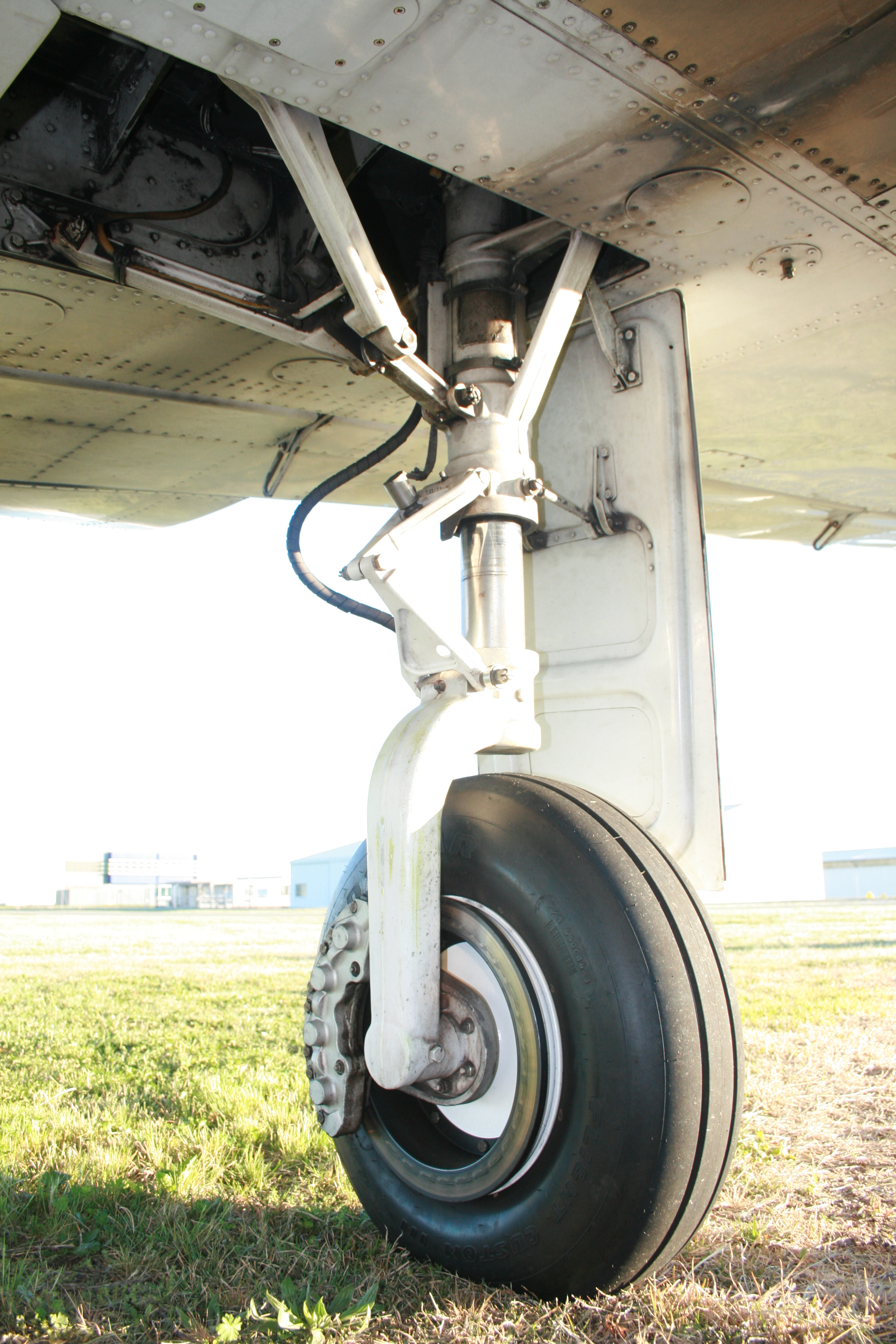
Landing gear with oleo strut and scissor- or torque links

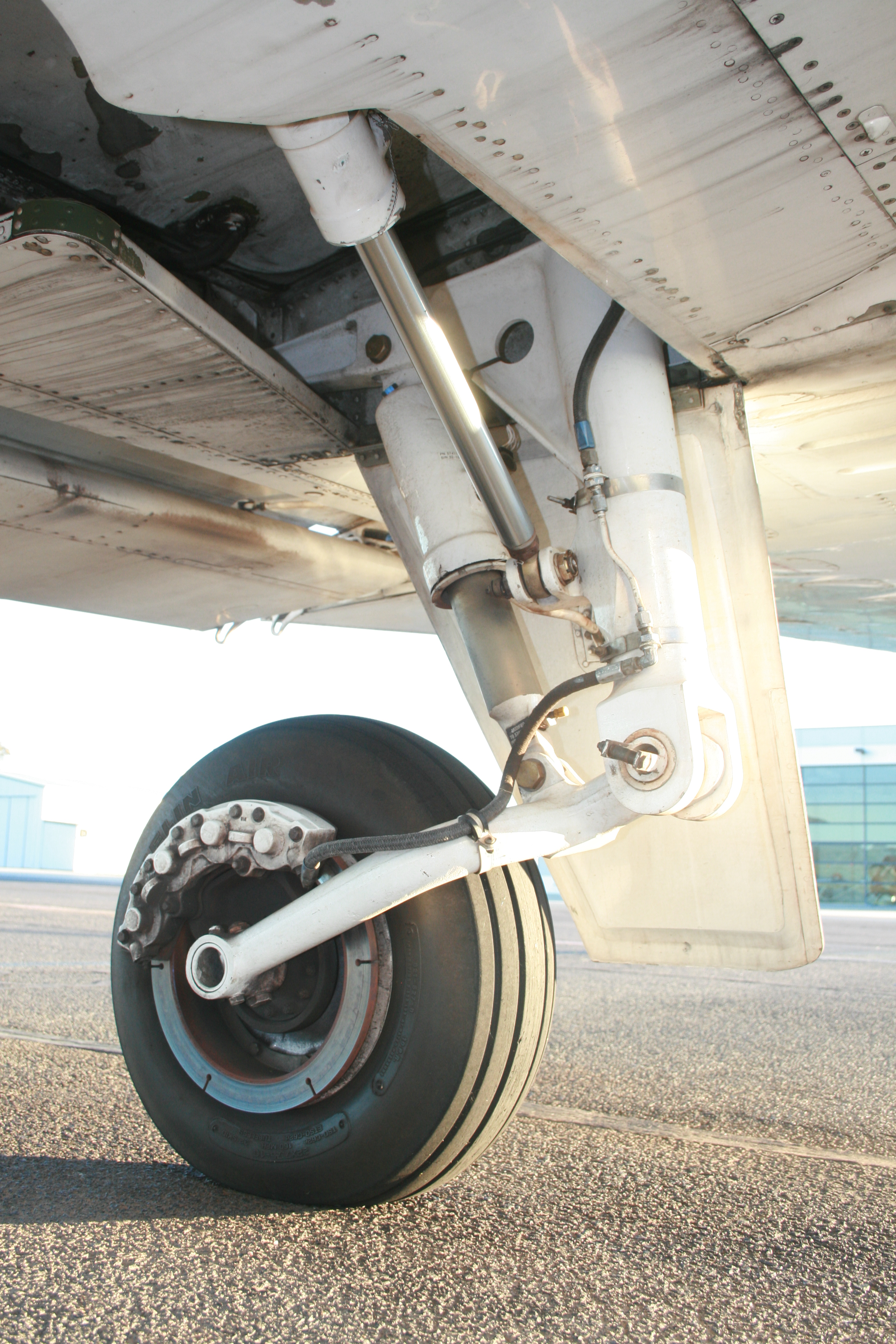
Landing gear with oleo shock absorber and trailing link

An oleo strut is a pneumatic air–oil hydraulic shock absorber used on the landing gear of most large aircraft and many smaller ones. This design cushions the impacts of landing and damps out vertical oscillations.

It is undesirable for an airplane to bounce on landing as it could lead to a loss of control, and the landing gear should not add to this tendency. A steel coil spring stores impact energy from landing and then releases it, while an oleo strut instead absorbs this energy, reducing bounce. As the strut compresses, the spring rate increases dramatically because the air is being compressed. The viscosity of the oil damps the rebound movement.

== History ==
The original design for the oleo-pneumatic shock-absorbing strut was patented by British manufacturing conglomerate Vickers Armstrong during 1915. It had been derived from the recuperative gear design of the Vickers gun, controlling recoil by forcing oil through precisely sized orifices. Vickers' oleo strut was first applied to an aeroplane by the French aircraft company Breguet Aviation.

The design proved to be viable and was extensively adopted across the aviation industry for fixed undercarriages, becoming simply referred to as an "Oleo unit" or undercarriage leg. Vickers' initial design had placed air above the oil, an arrangement that did not pose any problem until the introduction of retractable landing gear during the mid-1930s. The engineer, Peter Thornhill, devised a novel undercarriage strut that used a free-floating piston, not only being a lighter arrangement but enabling the whole strut to be inverted and to work while at an angle, eliminating the weakness of using an oil and air mixture. Oleo-pneumatic technology was subsequently reused by the manufacturer to produce several other products, including hydraulic railway buffers and industrial shock absorbers.

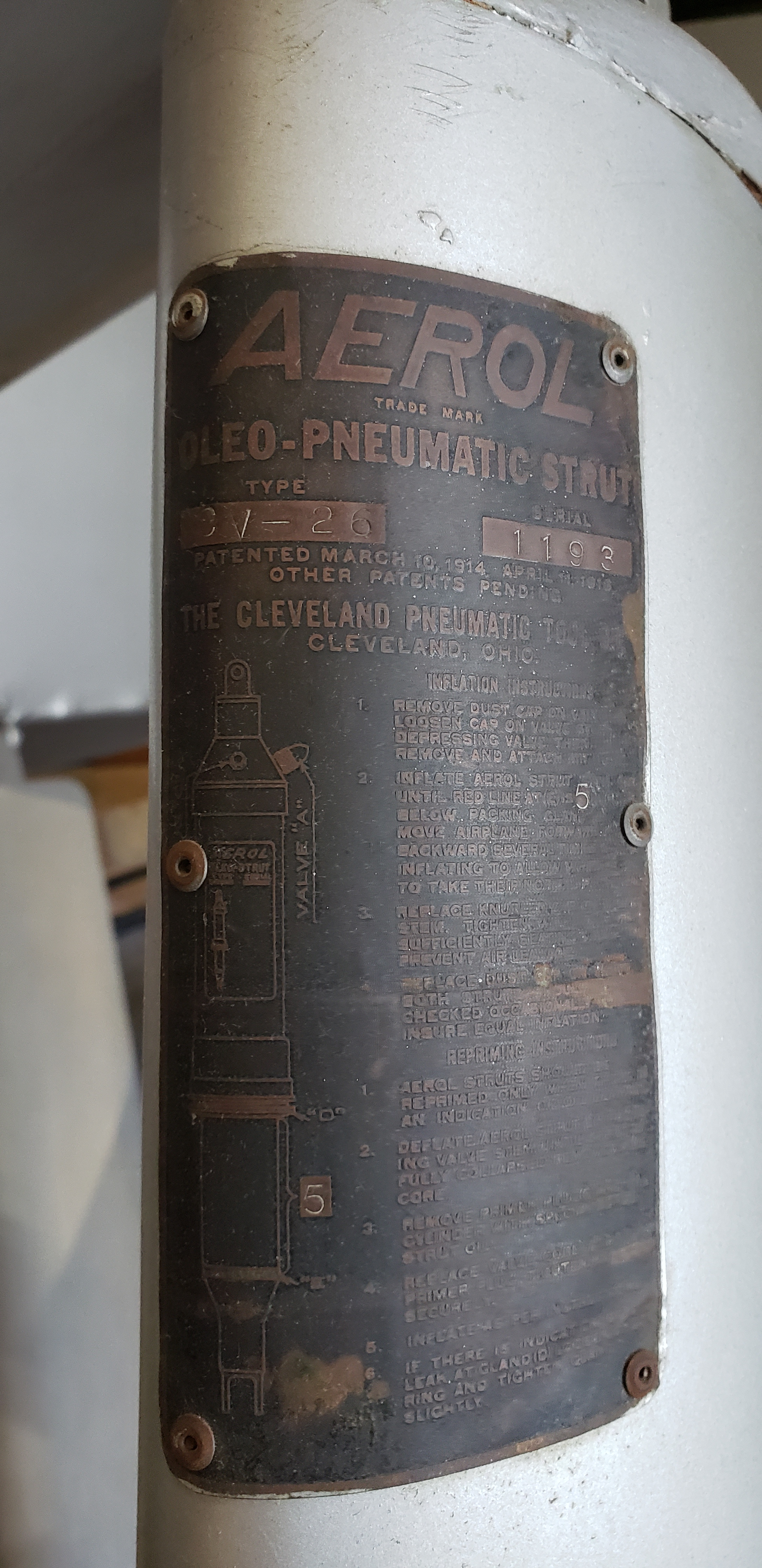
Aerol Oleo-Pneumatic strut

During 1926, the Cleveland Pneumatic Tool Company designed and introduced an oleo strut, one of the first to be purpose-designed for use on airplanes. The company subsequently marketed the product as an Aerol strut, which had entered widespread use within the United States within the space of a decade. By 1931, innovations in the field were being made in the United Kingdom, France, and North America. The oleo strut became commonly used for aviation purposes around the world. By the twenty-first century, a wide range of different shock-absorbing struts were in use, but typically employ common principles, despite considerable variations in size, weight, and other characteristics.

Refinements continued to be made to the technology behind the oleo strut. During 1954, hydropneumatic suspension was introduced, which uses the same principle of a gas that compresses (nitrogen) and a fluid that does not; in this use, an engine-driven pump is used to pressurize the hydraulic fluid. Another such example was a US patent filed by Jarry Hydraulics during 1958. During the 1960s, the British Ministry of Technology sponsored research into theoretical studies into improved oleo-damping technology. In 2012, it was proposed that the vibration-damping qualities of the oleo strut could be enhanced by using semi-active control to adjust fluid viscosity. The use of oleo struts for electric-powered automatic guided vehicles has also been evaluated.

According to Engineering360, by 2019, the oleo-pneumatic strut had become the most common type of shock absorber in use on modern aircraft. The oleo strut has seen much use on the largest cargo airplanes in the world, such as the Antonov An-124 Ruslan; it reportedly provides for a rough-field landing capacity while carrying payloads of up to 150 tons. This design also cushions the airframe from the impacts of taxiing, resulting in greater levels of comfort for passengers and crew.

In non-aircraft use, the Quadro range of motor scooters use the oleo strut, which is claimed to give favourable low speed lean characteristics.

== Operation ==
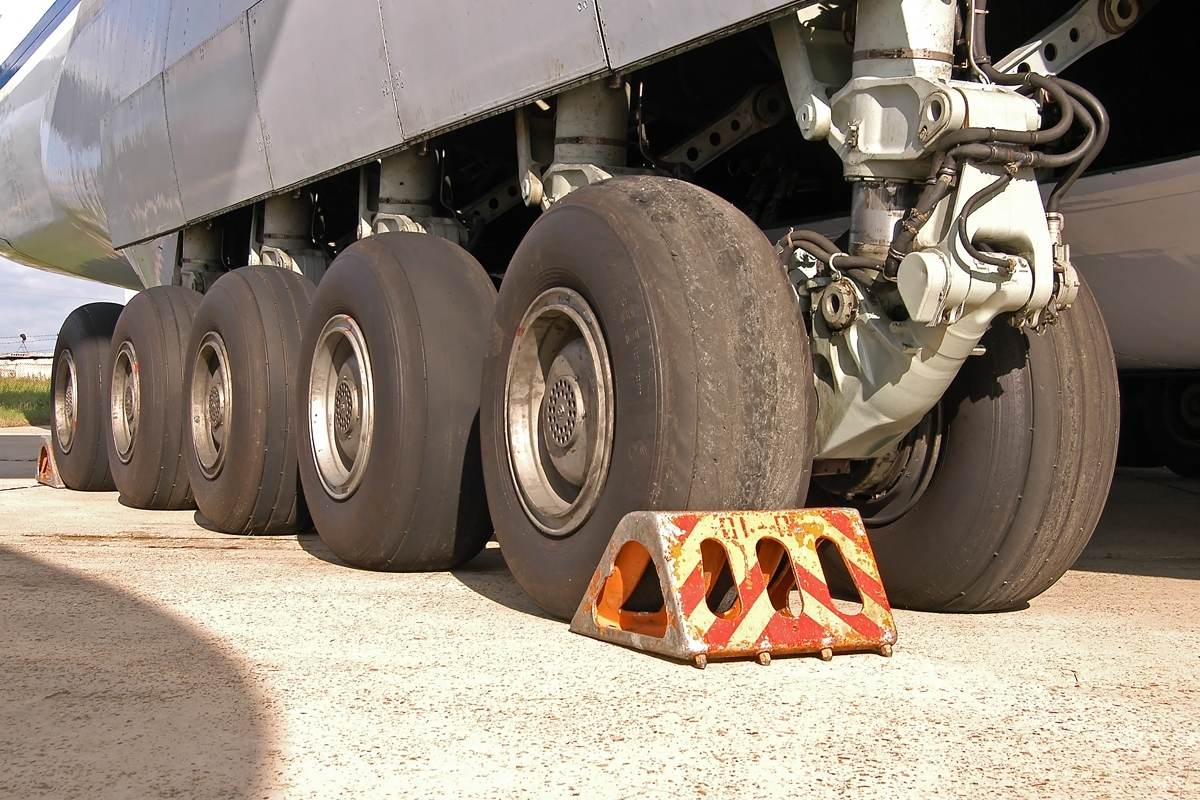
Antonov An-124 Ruslan landing gear

An oleo strut consists of an inner metal tube or piston, which is attached to the wheel axle, and which moves up and down in an outer (or upper) metal tube, or cylinder, that is attached to the airframe. The cavity within the strut and piston is filled with gas (usually nitrogen, sometimes air—especially on light aircraft) and oil (usually hydraulic fluid), and is divided into two chambers that are connected by a small orifice of a precise, calculated size.

When the aircraft is stationary on the ground, its weight is supported by the compressed gas in the cylinder. During landing, or when the aircraft taxis over bumps, the piston slides up and down. This movement compresses the gas, which acts as a spring, and forces oil through the orifice, which acts as a damper. A tapered rod is used on some designs to change the size of the orifice as the piston moves, providing greater resistance as compression of the strut increases. Additionally, a check valve is sometimes used to uncover additional orifices so that damping during compression is less than during rebound. Oleo struts absorb and dissipate forces by converting a portion of the accumulated kinetic energy into thermal energy.

Pneumatic systems like the oleo strut generally have long operating lives, and the construction is not unusually complex for maintenance purposes. Nitrogen is usually used as the gas instead of air, since it is less likely to cause corrosion. The various parts of the strut are sealed with O-rings or similar elastomeric seals, and a scraper ring is used to keep dust and grit adhering to the piston from entering the strut.

== See also ==
- Index of aviation articles
- FedEx Express Flight 80 – bounce during landing leading to crash
