= Bréguet 270 =

270
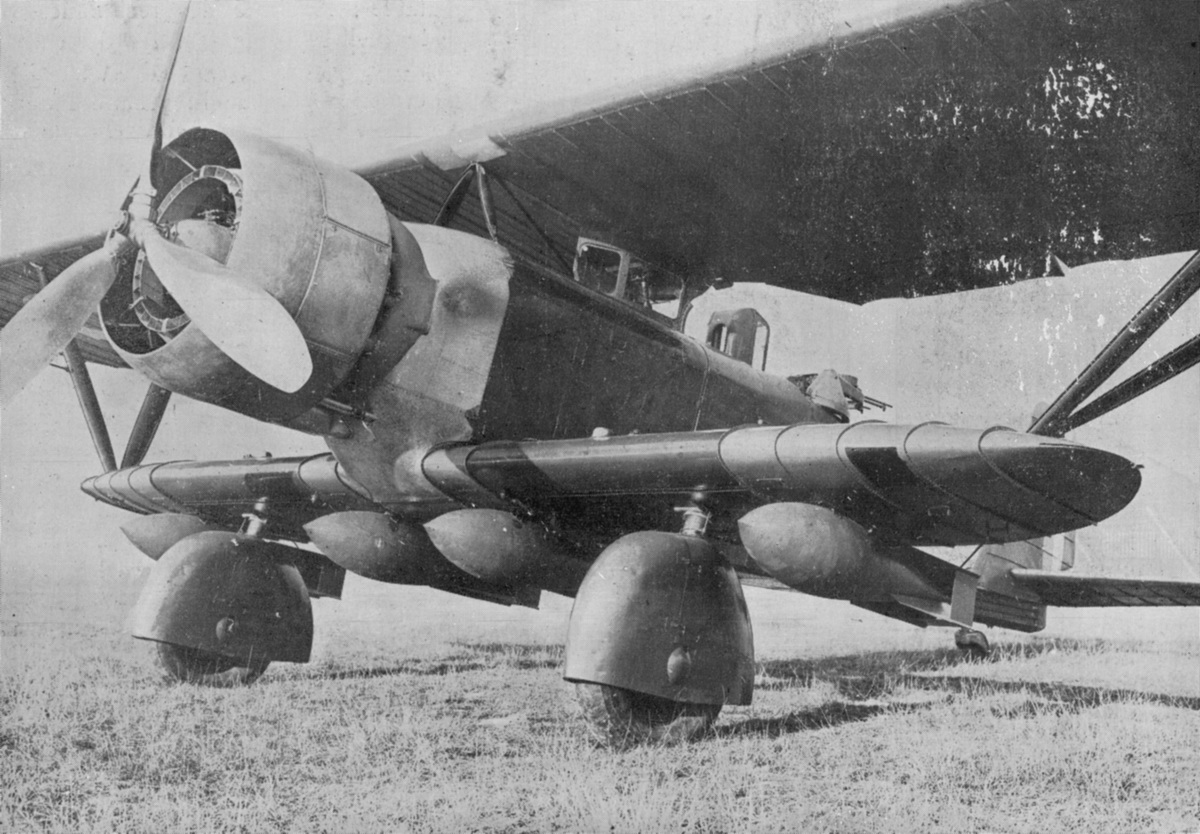
- Breguet 274 with Gnome-Rhône 14K (Mistral Major) 900 HP engine

General information
- Type: Reconnaissance aircraft
- Manufacturer: Breguet
- Designer: Marcel Vuillierme, Rene Dorand
- Primary users: Armée de l'Air Venezuelan Air Force and China
- Number built: over 227

History
- Introduction date: 1930
- First flight: 23 February 1929
- Retired: 1939

The Bréguet 270 was a sesquiplane military reconnaissance aircraft designed and produced by the French aircraft manufacturer Breguet.

It was designed in response to a requirement released by the Armée de l'Air (French Air Force) for a new twin-seat observation aircraft. This clean-sheet aircraft featured unusual fuselage that ended abruptly, aft of the two open cockpits, while the empennage was mounted on a boom behind the fuselage. It performed its maiden flight on 23 February 1929. In addition to its adoption by the Armée de l'Air, it was also sold on the export market to both Venezuela and China.

== Design and development ==
The Bréguet 27 was designed in response to a 1928 request for proposals issued by the Armée de l'Air that sought a new two-seat observation aircraft to replace the Bréguet 19. Bréguet decided to produce a new aircraft to submit for this requirement. This design, which was of a large all-metal sesquiplane, made extensive use of high-tensile steel for all stressed elements of the structure, a choice that represented a considerable departure from accepted practice of the era; the Bréguet 27 would be the first aircraft to employ such construction.

The first prototype, powered by a 500 horsepower (370 kW) Hispano-Suiza 12Hb engine, made its first flight on 23 February 1929. The first prototype underwent a number of changes during testing, including the fitting of rectangular tail surfaces, a revised rear fuselage and a metal propeller. It was followed by nine more prototypes, some of which were fitted with a 500 horsepower (370 kW) Renault 12Jc engine. The design was optimised to allow operation out of small airfields, with a takeoff run of only 115 m (377 ft) when fully loaded, although maximum speed suffered as a result of this focus on short field performance. In 1930, the Breguet 270 was selected as winner of the competition for an observation aircraft, ahead of the Potez 39 and the ANF Les Mureaux 131. In December 1931, an initial order was placed for 50 Breguet 270 A2, followed by an order for 35 more in 1932 and finally another order for 55 aircraft, giving a total of 140. The second placed Potez 39 was also ordered into production. Two high-altitude reconnaissance versions were also built as the Breguet 33, but these did not lead to further production.

== Design ==
The Bréguet 270 was a twin-seat sesquiplane military reconnaissance aircraft that featured a somewhat unorthodox design. Its structure was entirely rigid, lacking any internal or external bracing wires or rods and thus excluding rigging. All stressed structural members were composed of high-tensile steel, while secondary members, such as coverings, cowlings, and formers were typically composed of light alloys instead. Light alloys had been intentionally avoided for primary structures due to its mechanical properties. One key advantage of this structural approach was to permit the size of the fuselage to be minimised considerably which, amongst other benefits, impinged less upon the range of both vision and fire of the observer, although visibility for the pilot remained broadly similar to that of conventional aircraft. Despite its unorthodox nature, evaluation of the design proved that the Bréguet 270's aerodynamic efficiency was equal to that of most conventional aircraft of the era.

The various parts of the aircraft were typically assembled using riveting, which studies has determined to be the preferential method; exceptions were occasionally made in order to make disassembly of the overall aircraft practical, thus in such circumstances bolts were used instead. Neither studs or welding were used in the construction process. All parts were designed to facilitate automatic riveting by machine while the number of rivets was reduced to a minimum via the use of processes such as the corrugating of sheet metal and the rolling of edges in order that riveted stiffeners could be dispensed with. Seeking to ease the tasks of maintenance, repairs, and replacement, the assembly of the aircraft was deliberately shaped so to maximise interchangeability and standardise elements such pins and bolts. Permanent jigs were used for all subassemblies.

Being a sesquiplane, the lower wing of the Bréguet 270 was considerably smaller than the upper wing, accounting for only 17.6 per cent of the total area. Despite this, the lower wing was the centre point of the aircraft's structure, and thus had immense strength. Being a single-piece unit, it comprised a single spar of box construction composed of steel. It featured flanges made from large drawn plates with reinforcing corrugations joined by sheet webs stiffened in a similar manner. Internal frames of stamped steel provided considerable strength while the ribs, composed of sheet steel, featured rolled-edge lightening holes, slid on the spar and secured by riveted steel fittings. The wing covering was composed of duralumin sheeting that ran lengthwise between two adjacent ribs and riveted along the edges of the latter through an interposed inverted U-shaped strips of duralumin. Attachments for steel fittings at each end of the spar were provided for the wing struts.

In addition to its primary aerodynamic purpose, the lower wing served various secondary purposes. Its internal space accommodated, amongst other things, a total of four fuel tanks; for greater fuel capacity, the leading edge on either side could be replaced by a tank that had an identical external shape. The lower wing also bared a 'backbone' that substitutes for a conventional fuselage as well as the undercarriage. This undercarriage, which was directly mounted onto the lower wing's single spar, comprised two completely independent wheels without any kind of leg or strut. Instead, a relatively sturdy bracket, akin to the head lug of a motorcycle, that received the upper end of the fork supporting the wheel was used. The bracket incorporated a oleo-pneumatic shock absorber, the design of which Bréguet secured a patent on, as well as a special type of wheel bearing. The relatively large track of the undercarriage made contract between the ground and a wing tip reasonably implausible while air resistance was also reduced to a minimum.

The structure of the upper wing comprised two identical I-shaped steel spars with corrugated sheet steel webs and butterfly drawn profiles as flanges. It was free of compression tubes, except where struts joined with the spars. The upper wing was supported via struts attached to the tips of the lower wings in addition to the central cabane. The bracing members comprised two channel steel profiles that were riveted together back to back and disposed at right angles. It was strengthened using ribs, the majority of which were composed of duralumin while a minority of master ribs were composed of steel instead. A third false spar, composed of duralumin, was used to anchor the ailerons. These ailerons were divided into two portions, one of which was elastically mounted in such a manner that the effort required by the pilot was relatively uniform. Actuation of the ailerons was achieved via a series of toothed rods. As a result of the unusual strut arrangement used, the upper wing's incidence could be adjusted relatively easily via the use of a special spanner.

The aircraft's backbone is composed of two distinct parts, a central box and the tail boom; the former consisted of a steel beam of a small cross-section, attached at its forward end to the central box and resting directly on the lower wing, to which is bolted to the detachable engine unit. The cockpits formed an independent unit that was superimposed upon the central box to form, together with the engine cowling, the bodywork of the aircraft. Various different types of bodies, furnished with appropriate equipment for the mission to which the aircraft was to be tasked, with were available. The demountable body housing the pilot and observer's cockpits was of light duralumin construction; access to both cockpits was acquired via doors that were mounted so that they could be rapidly dropped mid-flight by merely knocking a lever so that emergency egress via parachute was as easy as possible for both crew. The pilot's cockpit was relatively roomy and comfortable; all instrumentation was conveniently placed while a curved windshield protected the occupant from external weather conditions. The observer's cockpit, which was also provided with a windshield, had a camera mounting installed in front of it, which, in combination with sliding apertures in the bodywork, facilitated convenient photography from both vertical and oblique orientations.

The forward end of the tail boom was attached to the rear of the central box by means of a heavy triangular stamped steel frame and a U-shaped steel frame. The rear end of the tail boom supported the stabilizing surfaces of the tail unit along with a compact swivelling wheel for the undercarriage. The design of the tail boom was particularly convenient in respect to the flight controls, all connections with the tail's movable surfaces were concealed inside of the spar while a conventional rudder bar was dispensed with in favour of a pair of pivoting pedals, one on each side of the spar. All connections with the tail surfaces and ailerons were rigid; dual control were fitted as standard although the observer's stick was removable. The use of tubes was intentionally avoided wherever possible.

The Bréguet 270 was designed to be powered by virtually any engine in the 500 to 650 hp range; it uses a relatively simple steel engine mounting that gave good accessibility to all parts that required attention. It could be replaced in mere minutes, being secured to the forward portion of the central box by only four pins. The cowling was provided with horizontal hinges, akin to a car's bonnet, and acted as both an oil tank and cooler. Directly beneath the engine was a radiator; cooling was regulated using shutters fitted in the cowling. All three air intakes were mounted along the same horizontal line; short exhaust stacks were typically provided, although some aircraft had silencers fitted for night operations.

== Operational history ==
In December 1932, the Breguet 270 entered service with a squadron tasked with evaluating the new type, with the Breguet entering regular service in May 1933. Through 1934, the Breguet 270 and Potez 39 gradually replaced the Breguet 19s in the reconnaissance squadrons in Metropolitan France. The type was temporarily grounded twice in 1935, between February and April, due to inflight tail boom failures, and from June to August after problems with excessive vibrations. In 1937, as the Armée de l'Air began to re-equip its front line units, single-engine observation aircraft like the Breguet 270 and Potez 39 were transferred to newly established Groupes Aériens Régionaux (GARs) (Regional Air Groups), with a core of experienced aircrew supplemented by reservists and using observer officers from the Army. Breguet 27s equipped 12 GARs in January 1938. In August 1938, during the Munich Crisis, General Joseph Vuillemin, Chief of Staff of the French Air Force, gave orders that, in the event of war breaking out, the obsolescent equipment of the GARs should never cross the front line. 27s continued in military service through the outbreak of World War II, still equipping three Groupes at the time of the initial German offensive. After they began suffering combat losses, the Army withdrew all remaining examples from service.

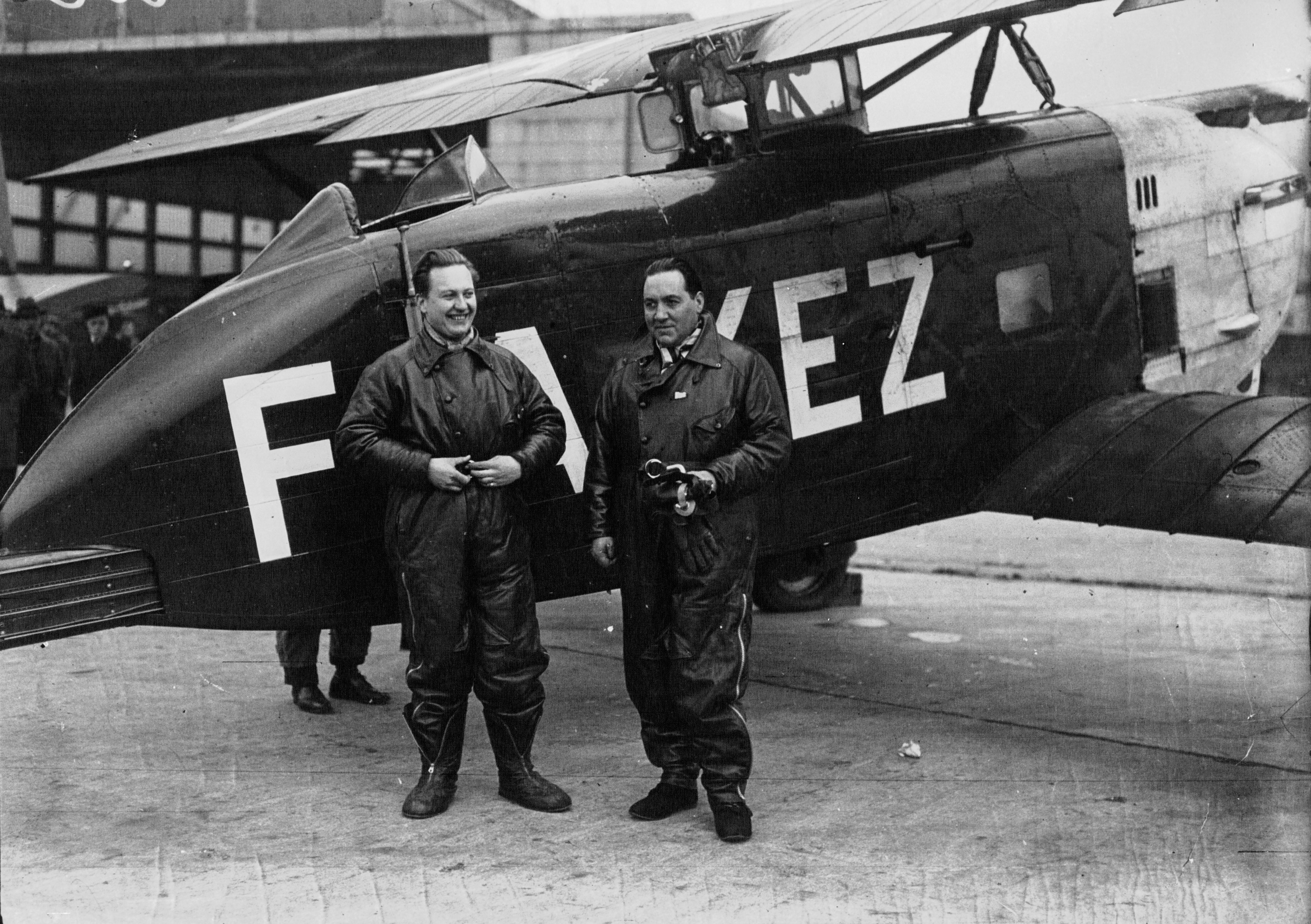
Codos and Robida, 1932

The two Breguet 33 high-altitude reconnaissance prototypes were used to make significant long-distance flights. The first aircraft was flown from Paris to Hanoi in January 1932 by Paul Codos and Henri Robida in 7 days, 9 hours and 50 minutes, and back again in just 3 days 4 hours and 17 minutes. The second aircraft (christened Joé III) was flown by Maryse Hilsz on a tour of Asia, visiting Calcutta, Saigon, Hanoi, and Tokyo before returning to Paris via Saigon, eventually covering around 35,000 km (22,000 mi). Hilsz also won the 1936 Coupe Héléne Boucher flying a Breguet 27 at an average speed of 277 km/h (172 mph).

The French army ordered 85 270s in 1930. In 1932, 45 Breguet 271s, with a more powerful 484 kW (650 hp) engine, and larger useful load were ordered. Older 270s were modified for VIP liaison duties.

== Variants ==
Breguet 27S
A single Bre.27S was constructed, modified from the Bre.330 No.2, powered by a single Hispano-Suiza 12Nb engine.

Bre.270
Prototypes (ten built) and initial production version (143 built) powered by a single Hispano-Suiza 12Hb engine.

Bre.271
Version powered by the Hispano-Suiza 12Y engine, 45 built.

Bre.272
Version powered by the Gnome-Rhône 9Kdrs engine, two built.

Bre.272TOE
(Théatres des Operations Extérieures) Version optimised for harsh colonial conditions with Renault 9Fas radial engine, 1 built.

Bre.273
Reconnaissance-bomber variant for export, powered by a Hispano-Suiza 12Ybrs engine, 13 built and one converted from a Bre 270. Ten more were built for China powered by Hispano-Suiza 12Ydrs engines, with three also being modified from Hispano-Suiza 12Ybrs powered versions.

Bre.274
Version powered by a 825 hp (615 kW) Gnome-Rhône 14Kdrs radial engine. One built and first flown in January 1934. Raced by Maryse Hilsz in 1935.

Bre.330
High-altitude version of Breguet 27 with Hispano-Suiza 12Nb engine, one later redesignated Bre.27S, two built.

Bre.330.01

Second Bre.330 prototype optimised for long-duration flight.

== Operators ==
Brazil

- Brazilian Air Force received small batch of Bre.270 aircraft.

China

- Chinese Nationalist Air Force received ten Bre.273 aircraft in 1934.

France

- Armée de l'Air received 85 Bre.270 designated Bre.270A.2 and 45 Bre.271 designated Bre.271A.2.

Vichy France

- Vichy French Air Force got ahold of remaining Bréguet 270's when France collapse in 1940.

Venezuela

- Venezuelan Air Force operated three Bre.270 aircraft and nine Bre.273 aircraft.

== Specifications (Bre.270A.2) ==
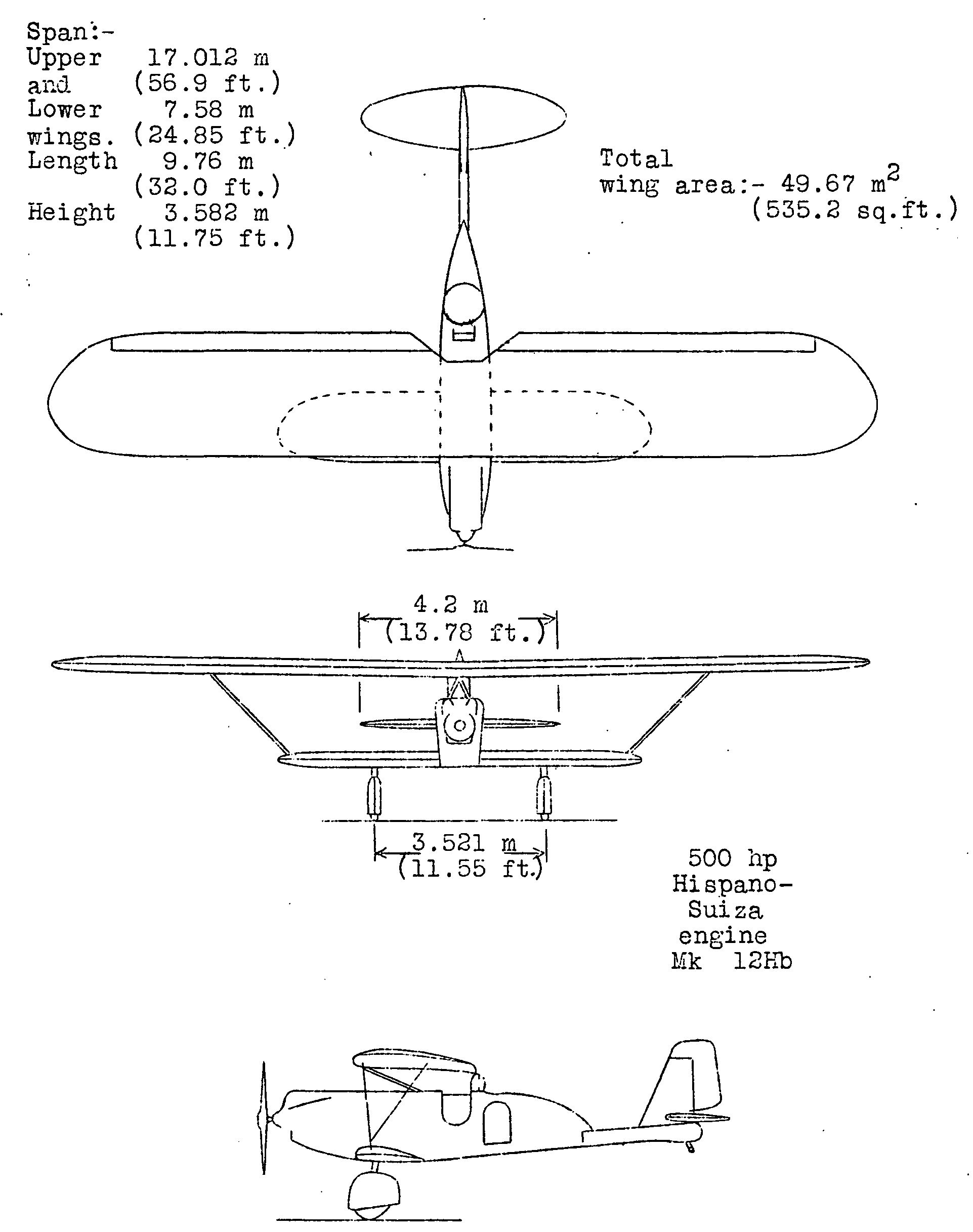
Breguet 270 3-view drawing from NACA Aircraft Circular No.127

Data from

General characteristics

- Crew: two (pilot and observer)
- Length: 9.76 m (32 ft 0 in)
- Upper wingspan: 17.01 m (55 ft 10 in)
- Lower wingspan: 7.58 m (24 ft 10 in)
- Height: 3.58 m (11 ft 9 in)
- Wing area: 49.67 m^{2} (534.6 sq ft)
- Empty weight: 1,676 kg (3,695 lb)
- Gross weight: 2,550 kg (5,622 lb)
- Max takeoff weight: 2,900 kg (6,393 lb)
- Fuel capacity: 490 L (130 US gal; 110 imp gal) (maximum)
- Powerplant: 1 × Hispano-Suiza 12Hb water-cooled V12 engine, 370 kW (500 hp)
- Propellers: 2-bladed Bréguet, 3.05 m (10 ft 0 in) diameter

Performance

- Maximum speed: 236 km/h (147 mph, 127 kn)
- Range: 1,000 km (620 mi, 540 nmi)
- Service ceiling: 7,750 m (25,430 ft) (absolute ceiling)
- Time to altitude:
  - Six minutes and 10 seconds to 2,000 m (6,600 ft)
  - 29 minutes to 6,000 m (20,000 ft)

Armament

- Guns:
  - 1 × fixed, forward-firing 7.7 mm (.303 in) Vickers machine gun
  - 1 × trainable, rearward-firing 7.7 mm (.303 in) Lewis Guns for observer
- Bombs: 12 × 10 kg (22 lb) bombs

== See also ==
Related lists

- List of Interwar military aircraft
