= ANF Les Mureaux 113 =

Military reconnaissance aircraft

110 family
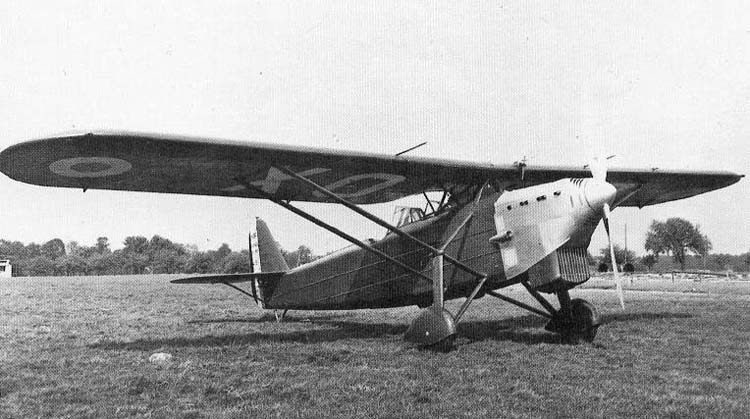
- A Mureaux 113 in 1931.

General information
- Type: Military reconnaissance aircraft
- Manufacturer: ANF Les Mureaux
- Designer: André Brunet
- Primary user: French Air Force
- Number built: ~285

History
- First flight: April 1931

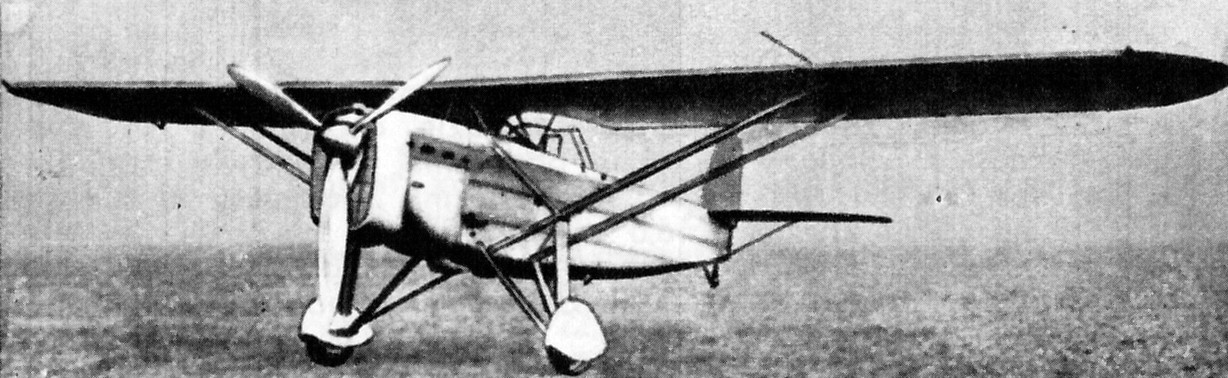
ANF Les Mureaux 115 R2

The ANF Les Mureaux 110 and its derivatives were a family of all-metal military reconnaissance aircraft developed and produced by the French aircraft manufacturer ANF Les Mureaux.

It was designed in response to a requirement issued by the French air ministry. Introduced to service during the 1930s, in excess of two hundred aircraft were procured for the French Air Force to equip not just its frontline units but also to replace aircraft such as the Potez 25s from reserve units. Multiple variants were operated by the service, perhaps most noteworthy was the conversion of 40 aircraft to serve as dedicated night fighters. The family was in widespread usage at the start of the Second World War, and thus saw intense combat during the Battle of France. All remaining aircraft were scrapped in the aftermath of the armistice with Germany.

== Development ==
The ANF Les Mureaux 110 originated with a French air ministry requirement for an aircraft to replace the Breguet 19 in Armée de l'Air service in the "R2" two-seat reconnaissance role. ANF Les Mureaux opted to produce a clean-sheet response to this requirement. It was during this design work that the firm developed a new technique for metal construction, it was promptly incorporated into the new long distance observation aircraft, which was later designated 111.

Two slightly different variants, the 110 and 111 were presented to the air force for evaluation, and were ordered into production soon thereafter. The first mass-production version was the 113 in 1933, of which 49 examples were purchased. This was supplanted in production by the 115 in 1935 and the 117 later than year. Both these series were given light bombing capability as well.

== Design ==
The ANF Les Mureaux 111 was an all-metal, parasol-wing monoplane designed specifically for aerial reconnaissance. The pilot and observer were seated in tandem open cockpits; these cockpits were relatively spacious, permitting multiple styles of parachute to be carried by the pilot. While the pilot was provided with an adjustable seat, the observer's seat was entirely removable. To optimise for both crew visibility and aerodynamic characteristics, the selected cross section for the aircraft's fuselage was trapezoidal, having a shorter base down and flat sides while both the top and bottom were rounded.

Being largely composed of metal, the fuselage covering comprised strips of duralumin that had a typical width of 20 to 30 cm (7.87 to ll.81 inches); these could be given flanged edges to permit their riveting together to form sheets. Occasionally, an alternative joining arrangement that used narrow angle pieces was harnessed instead. The structure of the aircraft consisted of both spars and longerons as the principal members, which were supported by an array of secondary spars and a channel section frame that were typically placed perpendicular to the covering strips to which they were riveted, changing them to closed sections best adapted to withstand local stresses. The rigidity of the covering was thus insured by the channel sections in one direction and either the strip flanges or angle sections in the other. The latter sections were continuous and only flattened to accommodate the passage of the channel sections that ran parallel to the spars. On both the top and bottom of the fuselage, the strips were placed transversely, which facilitated the use of a rounded form with the least preliminary shaping; however, the sides featured covering strips that were parallel to the longerons, where the number of channel sections was reduced.

The wing was constructed using similar principles to that of the fuselage; it was supported by a pair of tubular struts and the cabane. The internal structure featured two duralumin spars complete with a lightened web of sheet metal of 0 to 20 mm (0.4 to 0.8 in.) thick. These spars were of equal thickness to that of the wing with channel sections parallel to them, that were held in position by box crosspieces (instead of conventional ribs) at intervals of roughly one meter (39.37 inches). These crosspieces constituted a Warren girder, made up of channel sections, that supported 13 channel sections that ran parallel to the spars and were joined to the crosspieces using gussets. The covering strips were placed at right angles to the spars and were riveted to their flanges and to the channel sections, but not to the box crosspieces, to obtain torsional rigidity. The spars were braced against each other via a series of tubes present the plane of each flange.

The wing's covering comprised strips of sheet metal placed perpendicular to the spars and distributed across three zones, which were joined at the spar flanges. This covering had no other projections than the rivet heads, while the leading edge was attached by screws inclined at 45-degrees with their heads covered by compact sliding plates. The wing's interior could be easily inspected by removing the leading edge. The wing tips were rounded and relatively thin. To diminish fatigue while in a dive, the fineness of the wing was increased from 20.5 to 22.9. The ailerons, which were relatively narrow and unbalanced, were set into the wing and had differential control in order to reduce the force needed to actuate them. The travel of the depressed aileron was less than that of the elevated aileron, which resulted in a gentler manoeuvre and diminishing the likeliness of a side slip.

The undercarriage was relatively wide and lacked a continuous axle. It was equipped with a shock absorber that had a stroke of 12 cm (4.72 in.) along with brakes. A shoe-type tail skid was fitted to the underside of the fuselage, it was mounted on an oleo-pneumatic shock absorber. To facilitate the installation of various powerplants, a removal support was present in the engine bay. Cooling for the engine was provided by a water-cooled radiator installed within the engine cowling, the rate of cooling being adjustable via a shutter. Both the oil tanks and fire extinguisher were deliberately placed on the opposite side of the firewall from the engine; the fuel tank was also in a protected position within the fuselage, using two pumps to convey fuel to the engine. To reduce engine noise, it was equipped with a silencers.

== Operational history ==
The 113 entered service initially with the Armée de l'Air's reconnaissance Groupes, followed by the observation Groupes, and finally replacing the ageing Potez 25s in the Groupes Aériens Régionaux reserve units. It was followed into service by the 117 and 115. Between 1934 and 1935, 40 of the original 113s were converted into night fighters and used to replace those Breguet 19s that were still in service with France's two night fighter Groupes.

By the outbreak of the Second World War, the 115 equipped nine Groupes Aériens d'Observation, and the 117 nine more. By April 1940, 11 aircraft had been lost in action, leaving 228 on strength at the beginning of the Blitzkrieg in May. By the time of the French armistice with Germany on June 25, only 62 aircraft remained intact, some of which were stationed in North Africa.

== Variants ==
- 110 - two examples built for evaluation, 1x Hispano-Suiza 12Nb engine.
  - 110A-2 - prototype, 1x Hispano-Suiza 12Nb engine.
- 111 - one example built for evaluation, 1x Hispano-Suiza 12Nb engine.
- 112 R2 - the 110 prototypes re-engined as pre-production machines, 1x Hispano-Suiza 12Ybrs engine.
  - 112 GR - one specially-built aircraft to participate in 1934 Bibescu Cup air race
- 113 R2 - initial production version (Hispano-Suiza 12Ybrs) - 49 built
  - 113 CN - 40 113s converted into night fighters
  - 113 GR - racing version, equipped with a supercharged Hispano-Suiza 12Ybrs piston engine. Only one was built.
- 114 CN - single prototype of a purpose-built night fighter version
- 115 R2B2 - reconnaissance bomber with upgraded engine (119 built), 1x Hispano-Suiza 12Ycrs engine.
  - 115 R2 - this version was powered by a 634-kW (850-hp) Hispano-Suiza 12Yers piston engine.
- 117 R2B2 - reconnaissance bomber with revised aerodynamics (115 built), 1x Hispano-Suiza 12Ybrs engine.
- 119 - one 113 modified to challenge world altitude record with 500 kg payload, 1x Hispano-Suiza 12Ybrs engine.
- 200A.3 - Prototype observation aircraft, 1x Hispano-Suiza 12Ycrs engine.

== Operators ==
France

- French Air Force

== Specifications (115 R2B2) ==
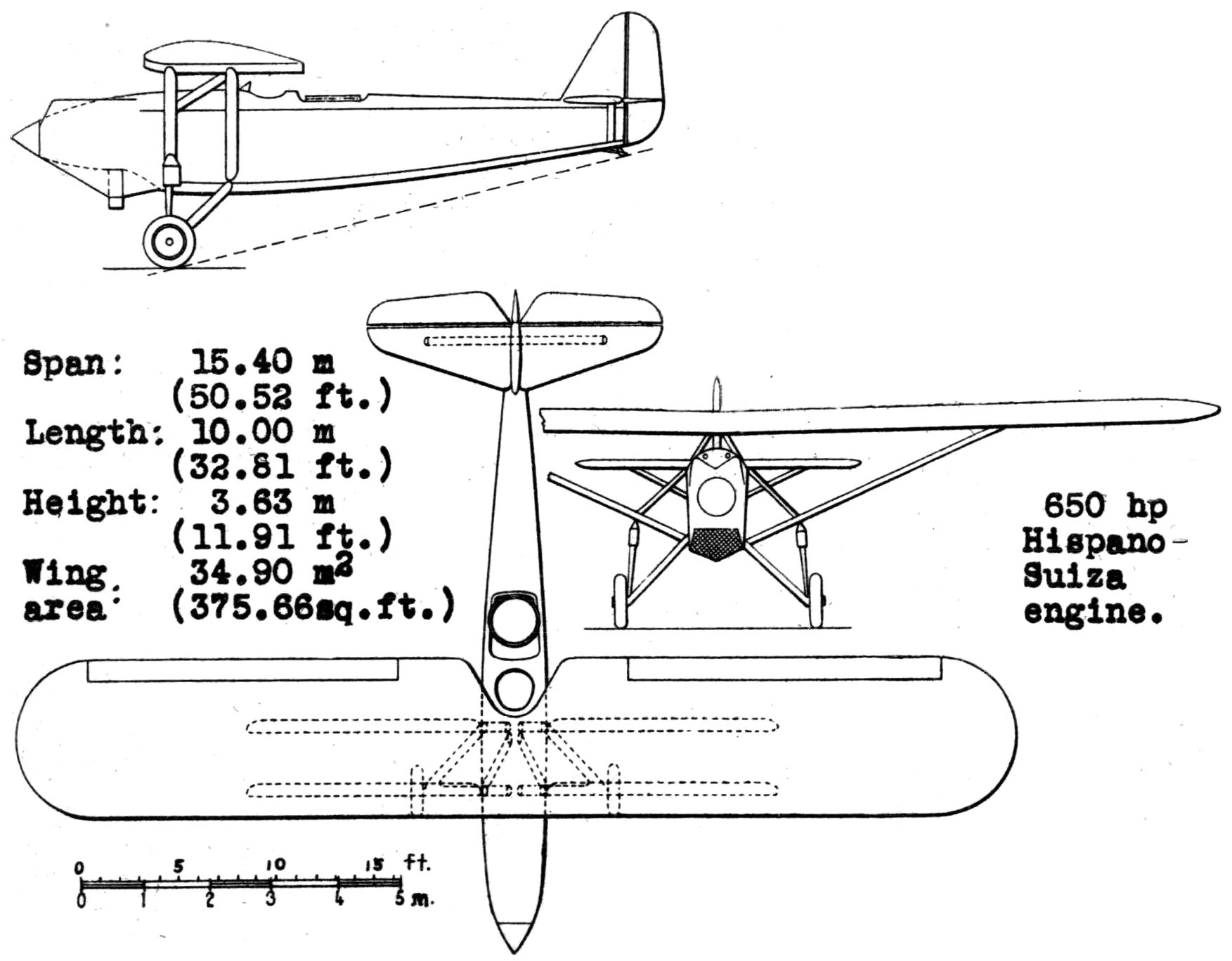
Mureaux 111 R.2 3-view drawing from NACA Aircraft Circular No.142

Data from La lignée des A.N.F Mureaux 110

General characteristics

- Crew: two (pilot and observer)
- Length: 9.98 m (32 ft 9 in)
- Wingspan: 15.40 m (50 ft 6 in)
- Height: 3.44 m (11 ft 3 in)
- Wing area: 34.90 m^{2} (375.7 sq ft)
- Empty weight: 1,757 kg (3,874 lb)
- Gross weight: 3,450 kg (7,606 lb) (overload)
- Fuel capacity: 1,000 L (220 imp gal; 260 US gal)
- Powerplant: 1 × Hispano-Suiza 12Ycrs , 640 kW (860 hp)

Performance

- Maximum speed: 328 km/h (204 mph, 177 kn) at 3,500 m (11,500 ft)
- Range: 1,500 km (620 mi, 540 nmi)
- Time to altitude: 24 minutes and 50 seconds to 8,000 m (26,000 ft)

Armament

- 1 × 7.5 mm MAC 34 machine gun firing through propeller hub
- 1 × flexible 7.5 mm MAC 34 machine gun for observer
- 1× flexibly mounted 7.7 mm Lewis gun firing through ventral hatch
- 200 kg (440 lb) of bombs

== See also ==
Related lists

- List of Interwar military aircraft
