= Bigelow House =

The Bigelow House may refer to a number of historic houses, namely:

- Charles H. Bigelow House, Findlay, Ohio
- Daniel R. Bigelow House, Olympia, Washington
- Henry Bigelow House, Newton, Massachusetts
- Dr. Henry Jacob Bigelow House, Newton, Massachusetts
