= Henry Bigelow =

Henry Bigelow may refer to:

- Henry Bryant Bigelow (1879–1967), American oceanographer
- Henry Forbes Bigelow (1818–1890), American architect
- Henry Jacob Bigelow (1867–1907), American surgeon
- NOAAS Henry B. Bigelow, a fisheries research vessel operated by the United States' National Oceanic Atmospheric Administration

== See also ==
- Henry Bigelow House, a historic house in Newton, Massachusetts
- Dr. Henry Jacob Bigelow House, a historic house in Newton, Massachusetts
- Harry Bigelow (1874–1950), American lawyer
