= Ephraim Curtis =

American colonial military figure

Ephraim Curtis (March 31, 1642 – c. 1684) was an American colonial military figure from Sudbury, Massachusetts, during King Philip's War.

== Biography ==
Ephraim Curtis was born in Sudbury, Massachusetts, the son of Henry Curtis, a carpenter who had migrated from England during the Great Puritan Migration to New England.

He is considered the first Purtain settler in what is now Worcester, Massachusetts. As such, he became intimate in the customs of local Native Americans and was able to interact with them. However, when King Philip's War broke out in 1675, he was forced to leave the area. He was soon commissioned as a lieutenant.

== King Philip's War ==
In August 1675, he was present at the siege of Brookfield, also known as Wheeler's Surprise, and was the officer that escaped under the cover of darkness and found Major Simon Willard, who then brought his company to relieve Brookfield.

On March 26, 1676, a band of Native Americans attacked Marlborough, Massachusetts. Curtis led troops, which held off the attackers, but the town soon had to be abandoned, except for military personnel.

== Legacy ==
Ephraim Curtis had a brother, Joseph Curtis, who named his son, Ephraim Curtis (1680–1759), after this hero of the King Philip's War. This nephew would himself become a military figure, as well as a local politician.

Ephraim Curtis Middle School in Sudbury, Massachusetts is named after him.
