= Jacob Bigelow (minister) =

Reverend Jacob Bigelow or Biglow (February 19, 1743 O.S. (March 2, 1743 N.S.) to September 12 or 13, 1816) was the minister of First Parish in Sudbury at the time of the American Revolution. He blessed the troops of General (then Captain) John Nixon before the Battles of Lexington and Concord. He was the father of Jacob Bigelow and the grandfather of Henry Jacob Bigelow.

== Early life, education, and career ==
Bigelow was born in Waltham, Massachusetts in 1743, and graduated in the Harvard class of 1766. He accepted the calling to be minister of First Parish in Sudbury on September 16, 1772, successor to Israel Loring. He married Elizabeth Wells on November 23, 1775. Together they had three children; Elizabeth born 1777, Jacob (1786 or 1787), and Henry (1783). According to Sudbury Town Records 1775-1776, he read the Declaration of Independence from the pulpit.

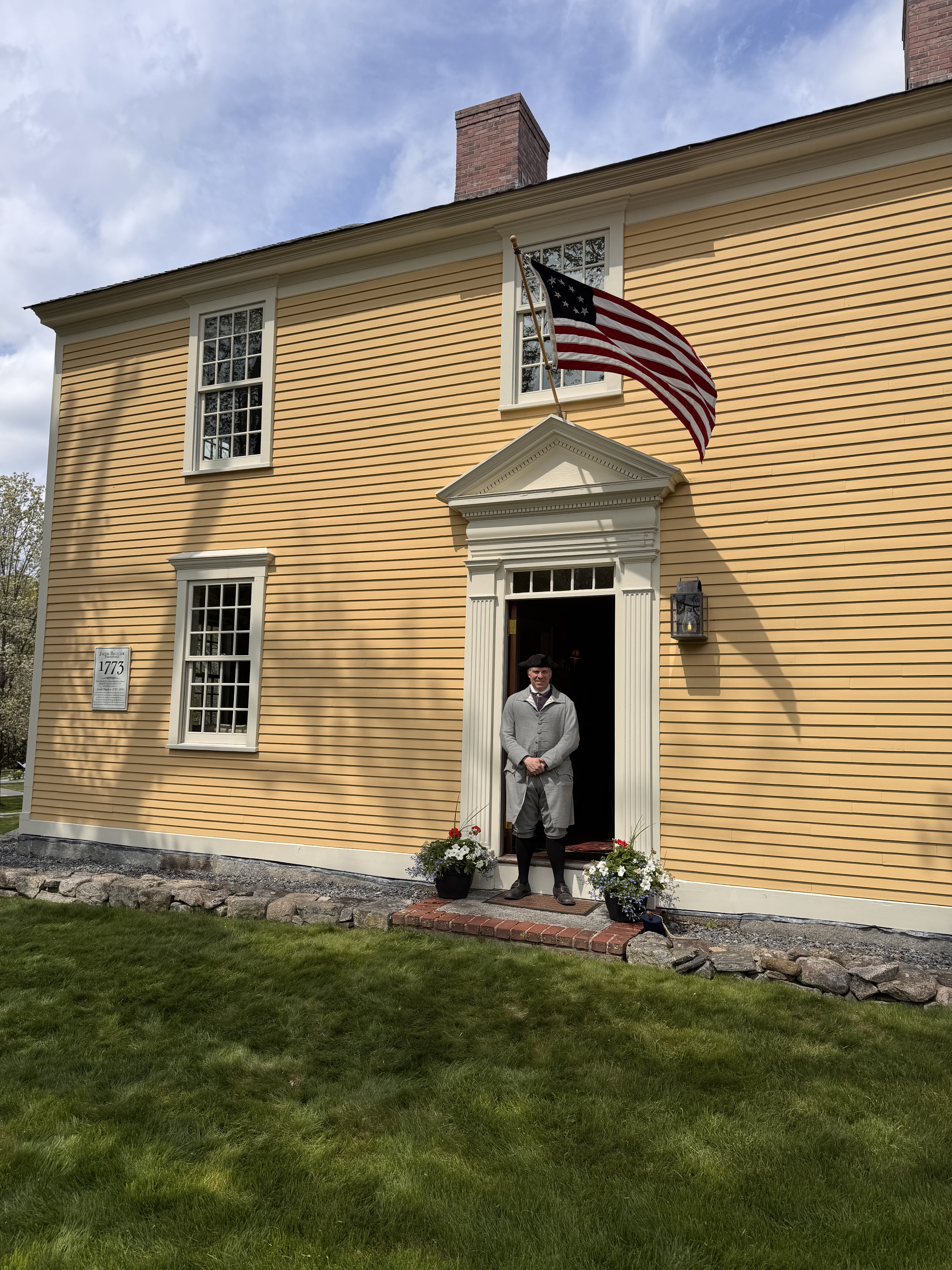
Sudbury Historical Society volunteer hosts the Sudbury 250 event (May 2, 2026) at Reverend Jacob Bigelow Parsonage 1773

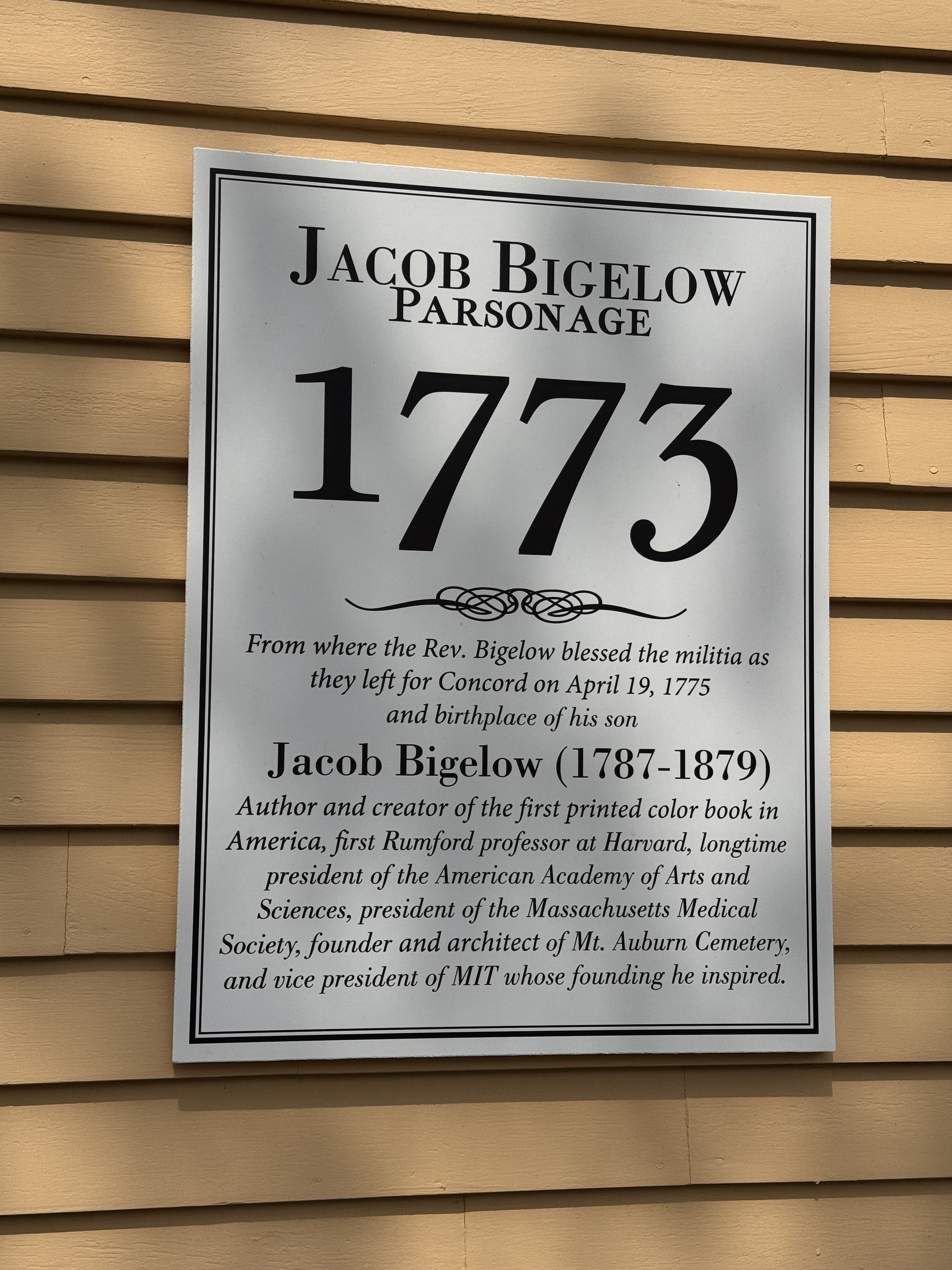
Plaque marking the Jacob Bigelow Parsonage in Sudbury MA built 1773

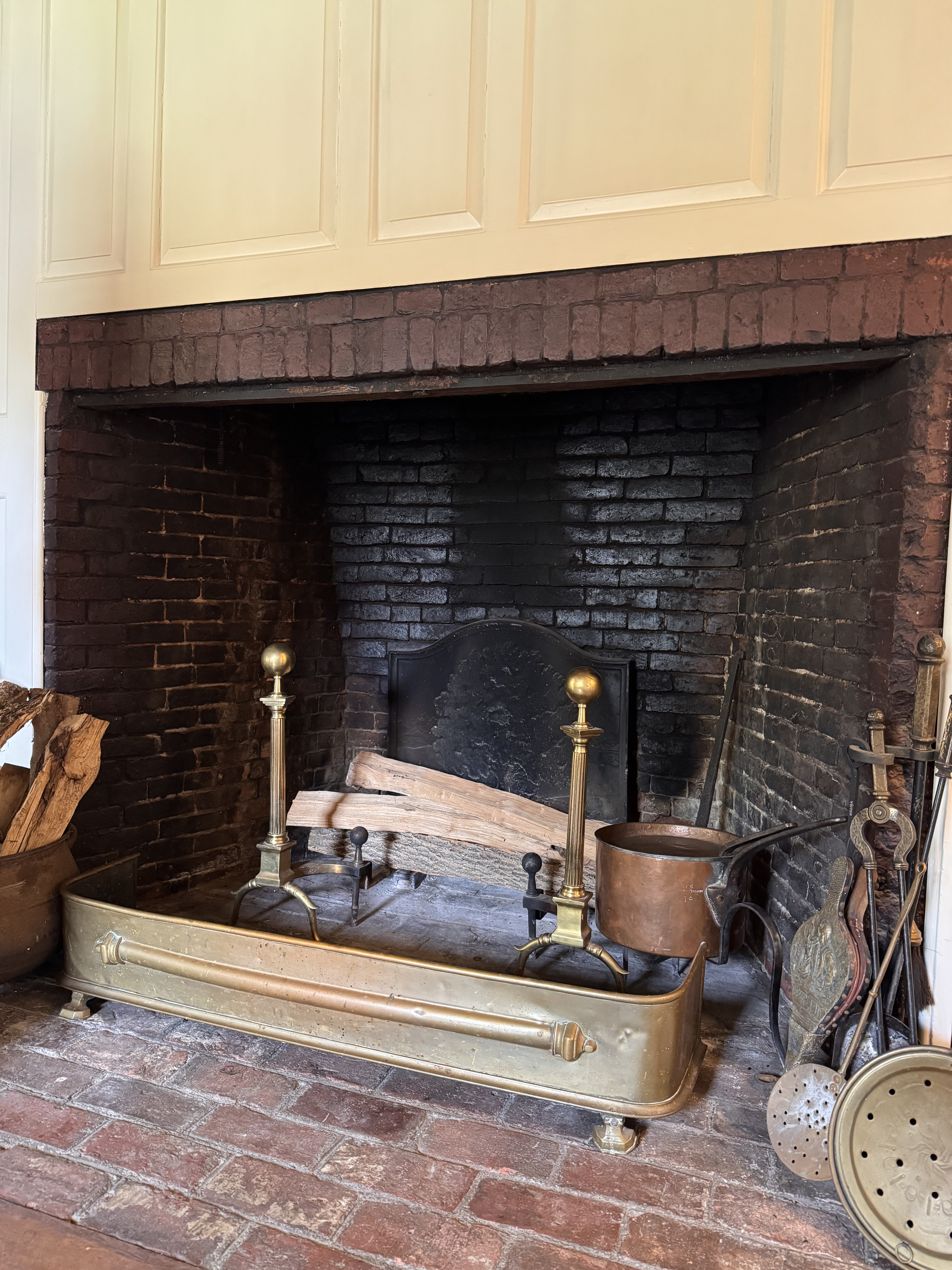
Original kitchen fireplace in the Reverend Jacob Bigleow Parsonage 1773

== Death ==
He died in Sept 1816 and was buried in the Old Revolutionary Cemetery in Sudbury, as was his wife, when she died a few months later.

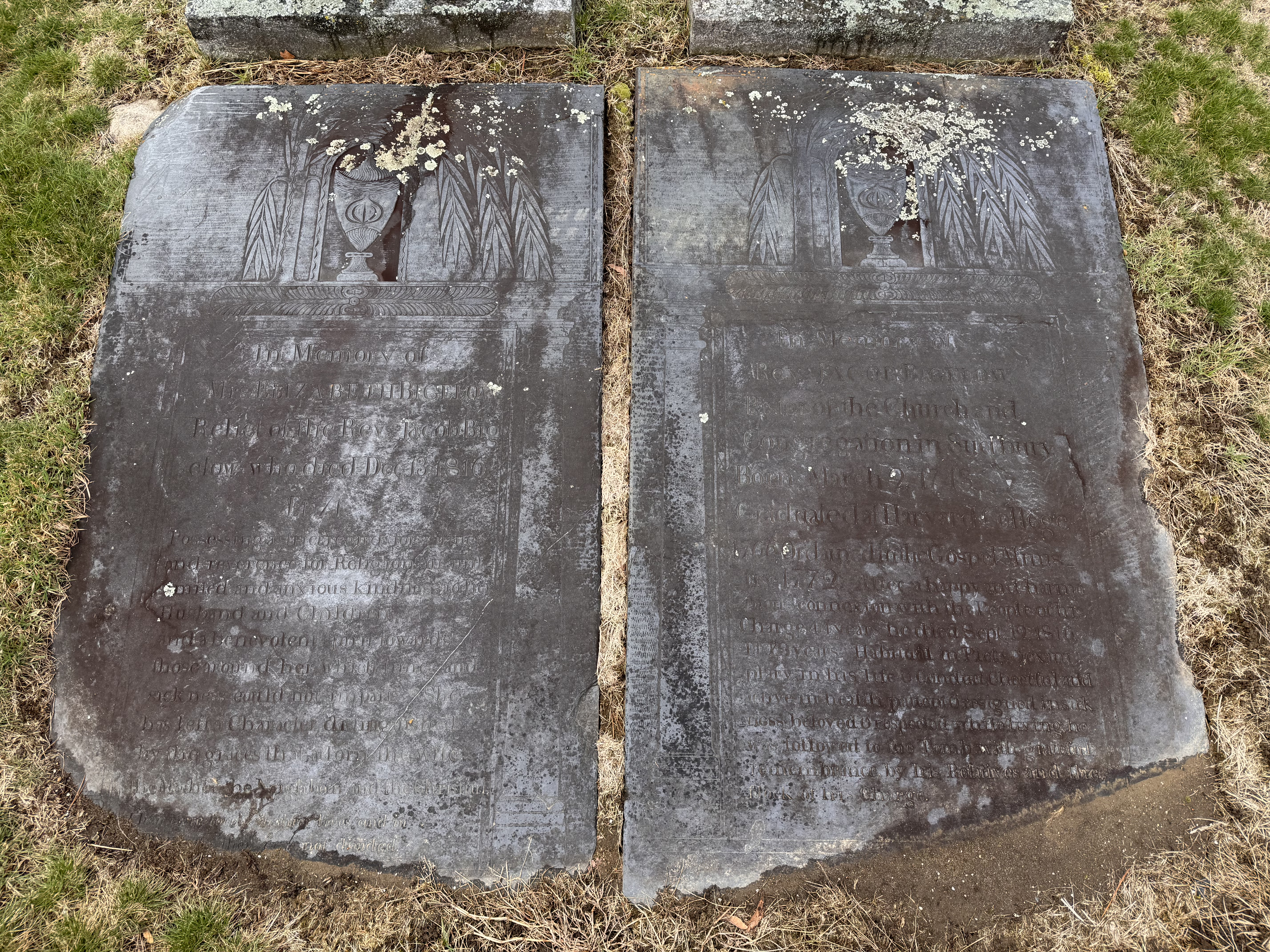
Footstones of Jacob and Elizabeth Bigelow in the Old Revolutionary Cemetery in Sudbury MA.

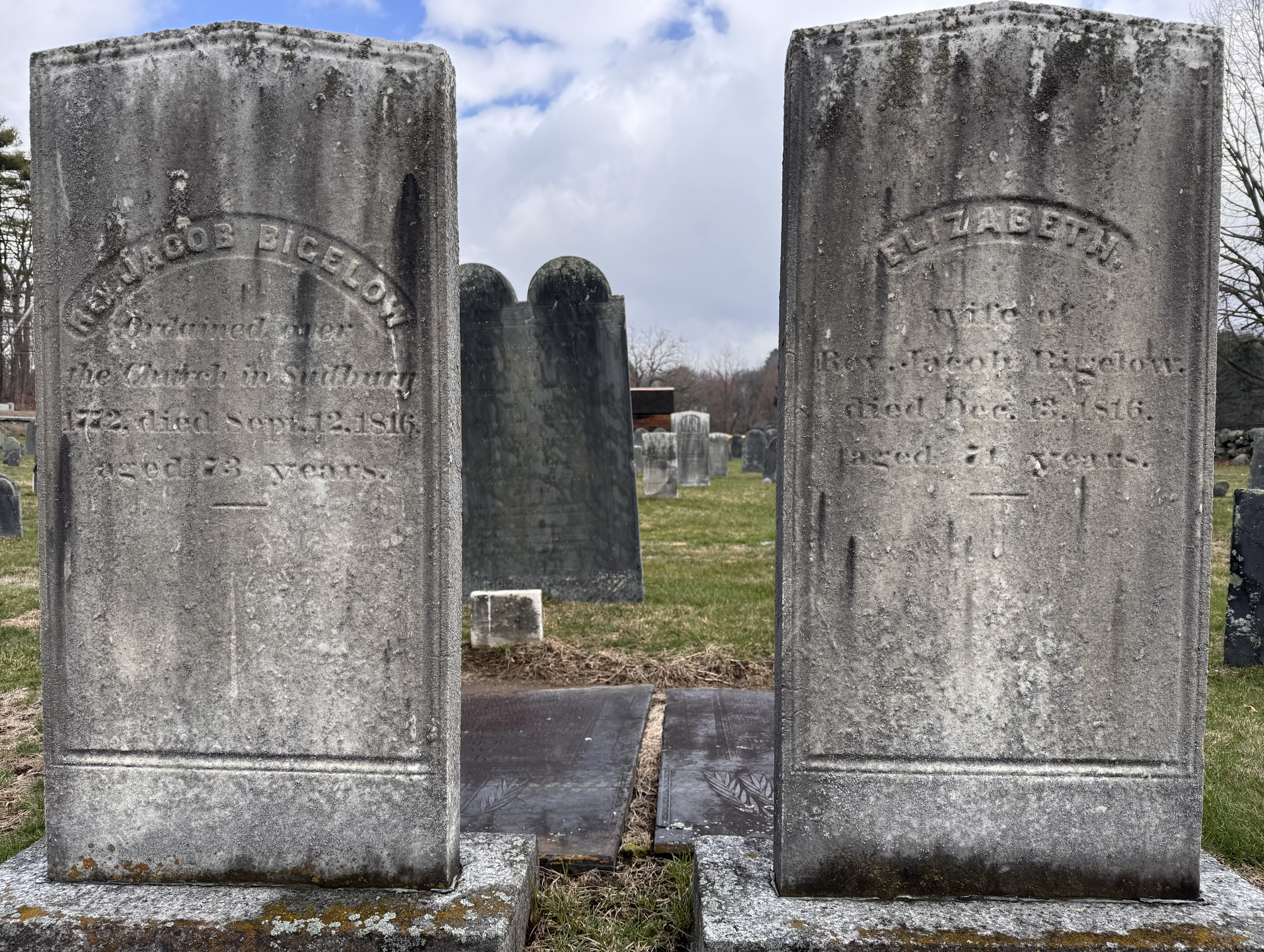
Headstones of Jacob and Elizabeth Bigelow in the Old Revolutionary Cemetery in Sudbury MA.
