= Sudbury, Massachusetts =

- Town
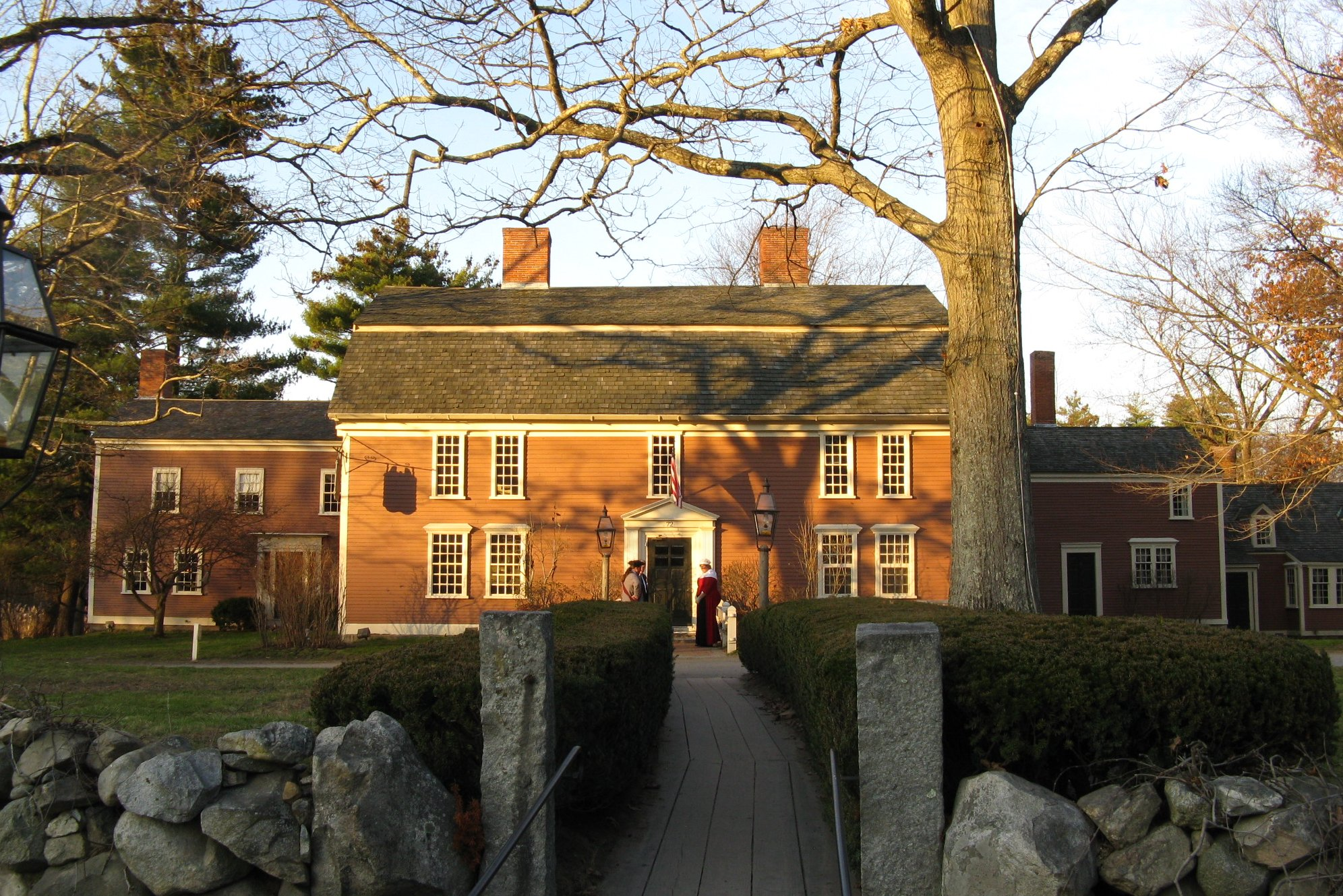
- Wayside Inn

- Seal

- Location in Middlesex County in Massachusetts
- Coordinates: 42°23′N 71°25′W
- Country: United States
- State: Massachusetts
- County: Middlesex
- Settled: 1638
- Incorporated: 1639

Government
  - Type: Open town meeting
  - Town Manager: Andrew Sheehan

Area
  - Total: 24.6 sq mi (63.8 km^{2})
  - Land: 24.4 sq mi (63.1 km^{2})
  - Water: 0.27 sq mi (0.7 km^{2})
- Elevation: 190 ft (58 m)

Population (2020)
  - Total: 18,934
  - Density: 777/sq mi (300/km^{2})
- Time zone: UTC−5 (Eastern)
  - Summer (DST): UTC−4 (Eastern)
- ZIP Code: 01776
- Area code: 351 / 978
- FIPS code: 25-68260
- GNIS feature ID: 0618237
- Website: sudbury.ma.us

Sudbury is a town in Middlesex County, Massachusetts, United States. At the 2020 census, it had a population of 18,934. The town, located in Greater Boston's MetroWest region, has a colonial history.

== History ==
Incorporated in 1639, the boundaries of Sudbury included (by 1653) what is now Wayland (which split off in 1780, initially as East Sudbury), and parts of present day Framingham, Marlborough, Stow and Maynard (the latter town splitting off in 1871). Nipmuc Indians lived in what is now Sudbury, including Tantamous, a medicine man, and his son Peter Jethro, who deeded a large parcel of land to Sudbury for settlement in 1684.

The original town center and meetinghouse were located near the Sudbury River at what is now known as Wayland's North Cemetery. For the residents on the west side of the river, it was a treacherous passage in the winter and attendance at both worship services and Town Meetings was compulsory. In 1723 the West Parish meetinghouse was built west of the river at an area known as Rocky Plains (presently the Town Center). It served as a place for both worship and Town Meetings. The church and town separated in 1836 and a new Town House was built in 1846. Since then, the Sudbury Center Historic District has changed little, with the exception of the Town Hall, built in 1932 to replace the Town House, which burnt down in 1930.

Sudbury also contributed the most militia during King Philip's War and was the site of the well-known attack on Sudbury. Ephraim Curtis was a successful leader of the militia of West Sudbury and would lend his name to the town's junior high school. Sudbury militiamen participated in the battles of Lexington and Concord in 1775, where they sniped at British Army troops returning to Boston.

One of Sudbury's historic landmarks, the Wayside Inn, claims to be the country's oldest operating inn, built and run by the Howe family for many generations. Henry Wadsworth Longfellow wrote Tales of a Wayside Inn, a book of poems published in 1863. In the book, the poem The Landlord's Tale was the source of the immortal phrase "listen my children and you shall hear, of the midnight ride of Paul Revere." Henry Ford bought the inn in 1923, restored it and donated it to a charitable foundation which continues to run it as an operating inn to this day. Ford also built a boys' school on the property, as well as a grist mill, and the Martha-Mary Chapel. He brought in the Redstone Schoolhouse from Sterling, which was reputed to be the school in Sarah Josepha Hale's nursery rhyme Mary Had a Little Lamb. However, Giuseppi Cavicchio's refusal to sell his water rights scuttled Henry Ford's plans to build an auto parts factory at the site of Charles O. Parmenter's mill in South Sudbury.

In August 1925, a Sudbury farm was the scene of a riot between local members of the Ku Klux Klan and Irish-American youths from the area. Five people were wounded by gunshots, and the State Police arrested over 100 Klansmen. Massachusetts officials cracked down on the group's meetings thereafter, and the Klan died out in the area.

In the period after World War II, Sudbury experienced rapid growth in population and industry. Defense contractor Raytheon was a significant employer, operating a large research facility in Sudbury from 1958 until 2016. Another major employer in that period was Sperry Rand. In the 1970s, the town was home to many of the engineers working in the minicomputer revolution at Digital Equipment Corporation in nearby Maynard. Sudbury was also one of the largest carnation-growing towns, with many greenhouse operations.

From 1960–1969, Sudbury challenged and prevailed against a proposal by Boston Edison Company that would have installed overhead transmission lines through what is now Great Meadows National Wildlife Refuge. Ultimately, the line was instead buried under streets to Maynard. From 2017–2023, Sudbury challenged a proposal by Eversource to install buried transmission lines under the former Massachusetts Central Railroad right of way from Sudbury to Hudson now owned by the Massachusetts Bay Transportation Authority. None of these lawsuits were found to have merit, and the buried transmission lines were installed by 2024, which also subsidized the majority of the cost and construction of a 7.6-mile (12.2 km) section of the Mass Central Rail Trail—Wayside, which was paved in 2025.

Residentially, Sudbury's 1-acre (4,000 m^{2}) zoning bylaws helped the town maintain a more rural character through the 1970s and 1980s when developments of single-family Colonials and large Capes established it as an affluent location. Economic growth was restricted to the town's main thoroughfare, US Route 20. Significant tracts of open space—including much wetland—were preserved in the northern half of town and along the Hop Brook corridor flowing from the Wayside Inn Historic District in the southwest part of town through the King Philip Historic District (the site of a conflict in King Philip's War) and into the Sudbury River at the southeast border with Wayland. A significant portion of the Assabet River National Wildlife Refuge (opened in 2005) is located in Sudbury.

== Geography ==
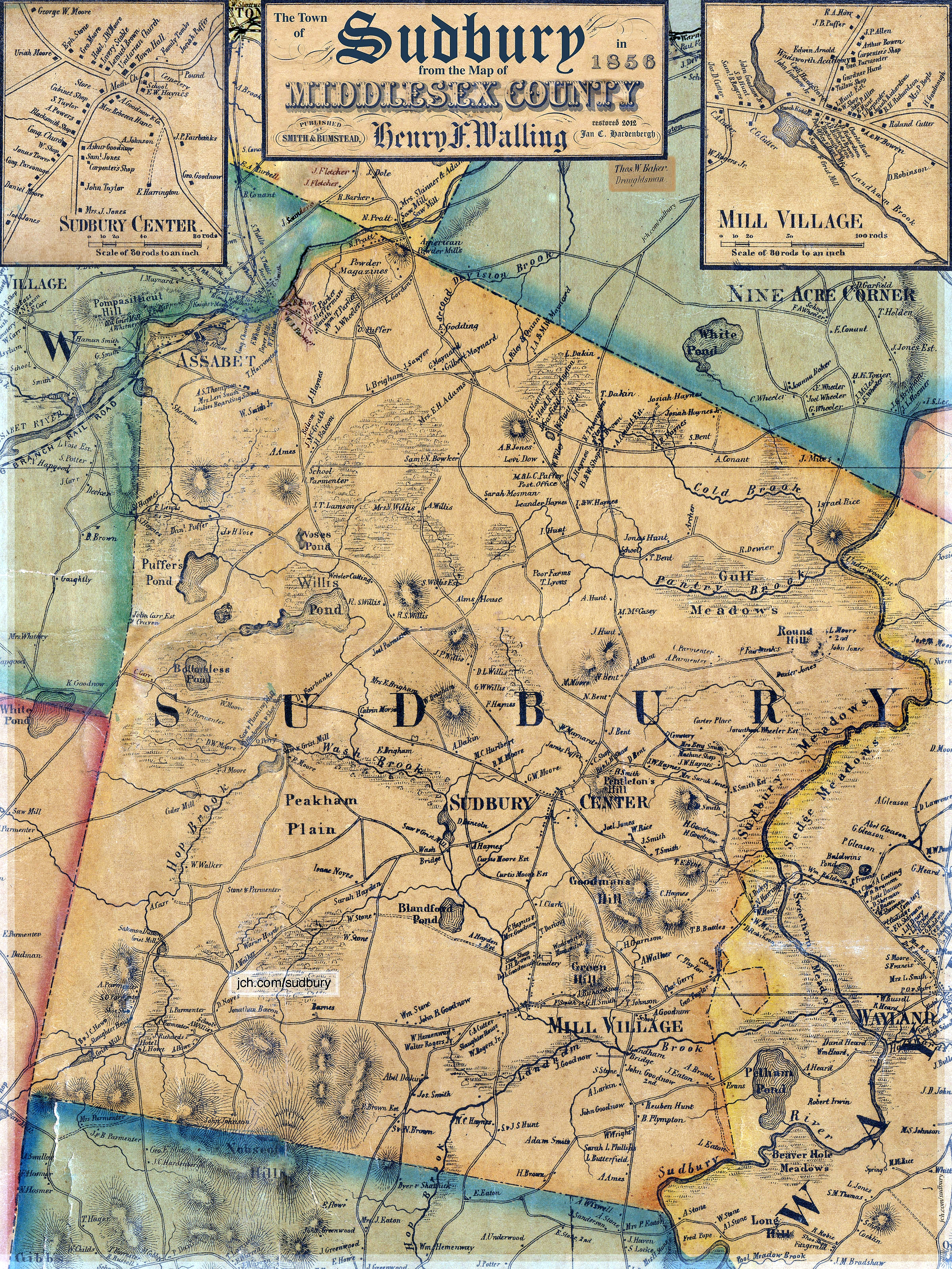
Sudbury in 1856

According to the United States Census Bureau, the town has a total area of 24.6 square miles (64 km^{2}), of which 24.4 square miles (63 km^{2}) is land and 0.3 square miles (0.78 km^{2}), or 1.06%, is water. The highest point in Sudbury is on the north slope of Nobscot Hill, and the highest summit is Tippling Rock.

In 1650, the town included Sudbury as well as most of Wayland and Maynard.

== Demographics ==
Historical population
Year	Pop.	±%
1790	1,290	—
1800	1,303	+1.0%
1810	1,287	−1.2%
1820	1,417	+10.1%
1830	1,423	+0.4%
1840	1,422	−0.1%
1850	1,578	+11.0%
1860	1,691	+7.2%
1870	2,091	+23.7%
1880	1,178	−43.7%
1890	1,197	+1.6%
1900	1,150	−3.9%
1910	1,120	−2.6%
1920	1,121	+0.1%
1930	1,182	+5.4%
1940	1,754	+48.4%
1950	2,596	+48.0%
1960	7,447	+186.9%
1970	13,506	+81.4%
1980	14,027	+3.9%
1990	14,358	+2.4%
2000	16,841	+17.3%
2010	17,659	+4.9%
2020	18,934	+7.2%
2024*	19,805	+4.6%
* population 1850–2010; Source: United States census records and Population Estimates Program data. * population 1790–1840 Source: Map Of Massachusetts

As of the census of 2000, there were 16,841 people, 5,504 households, and 4,749 families residing in the town. The population density was 691.1 inhabitants per square mile (266.8/km^{2}). There were 5,590 housing units at an average density of 229.4 per square mile (88.6/km^{2}). The racial makeup of the town was 94.23% White, 0.80% African American, 0.03% Native American, 3.72% Asian, 0.03% Pacific Islander, 0.23% from other races, and 0.96% from two or more races. Hispanic or Latino of any race were 1.24% of the population. An update in the town's census recorded the population at 18,192 as of October 6, 2015.

There were 5,504 households, out of which 51.1% had children under the age of 18 living with them, 78.5% were married couples living together, 6.2% had a female householder with no husband present, and 13.7% were non-families. 11.0% of all households were made up of individuals, and 5.5% had someone living alone who was 65 years of age or older. The average household size was 3.02 and the average family size was 3.28.

In the town, the population was spread out, with 32.5% under the age of 18, 3.2% from 18 to 24, 27.3% from 25 to 44, 27.2% from 45 to 64, and 9.8% who were 65 years of age or older. The median age was 39 years. For every 100 females, there were 95.4 males. For every 100 females age 18 and over, there were 92.3 males.

The median income for a household in the town was $151,041, and the median income for a family was $222,008. Males had a median income of $148,593 versus $47,500 for females. The per capita income for the town was $75,865. About 2.1% of families and 2.8% of the population were below the poverty line, including 3.9% of those under age 18 and 4.8% of those age 65 or over.

== Arts and culture ==
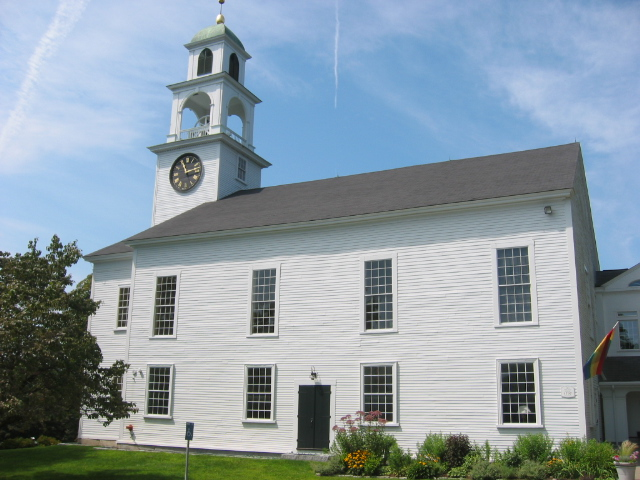
Sudbury's First Parish Church

The First Parish of Sudbury gathered in 1640 east of the Sudbury River (present day Wayland). "East parish" (now First Parish of Wayland) moved its present site and "West parish" moved to the present site, called Rocky Plains (now Sudbury town center), upon Rev. Israel Loring first preaching there May 6, 1722. The historic meeting house was built in 1797, replacing the original 1723 structure. First Parish became Unitarian in the local schism of 1837 and is now Unitarian Universalist.

== Government ==
=== State and federal government ===
On the federal level, Precincts 1A, 2, 3, 4, and 5 of Sudbury are part of Massachusetts's 5th congressional district, represented by Katherine Clark. Precinct 1 is part of Massachusetts's 3rd congressional district, represented by Lori Trahan. The state's senior (Class I) member of the United States Senate is Elizabeth Warren. The junior (Class II) senator is Ed Markey.

== Education ==
Sudbury students in kindergarten through eighth grade attend Sudbury Public Schools, with high school students attending schools in the Lincoln-Sudbury Regional School District, which was established in 1954, integrating the former Sudbury High School with that of the nearby town of Lincoln.

In June 2002, the towns of Lincoln and Sudbury began a $74 million project to build a new high school near the site of the original building. The shared Lincoln-Sudbury Regional High School (LSRHS) is in Sudbury.

There are four elementary schools in Sudbury and one middle school. The four elementary schools are:

- Josiah Haynes Elementary School
- Israel Loring Elementary School
- General John Nixon Elementary School
- Peter Noyes Elementary School

The middle school is:

- Ephraim Curtis Middle School

Sudbury has two former elementary schools that were converted to other uses:

- Fairbank Elementary School is now a community center, and the central office for the school district.
- Horse Pond Elementary School is now a Massachusetts State Police Crime Laboratory.

== Notable people ==
- Horace Abbott, iron manufacturer
- George Hunt Barton, geologist, arctic explorer, and college professor. Founding president of the Boston Children's Museum
- Jacob Bigelow, physician and botanist and his father Jacob Bigelow (minister)
- Edith Nason Buckingham, zoologist, dog breeder, chicken farmer
- Anthony W. Case, astrophysicist
- Sarah Cloyce, Salem witch trials survivor; relocated to Sudbury after permanently leaving Salem
- Ralph Adams Cram, architect, resided in Sudbury on Concord Road and built his family a private chapel which is now owned and operated by Saint Elizabeth's Episcopal Church
- Coco Crisp, lived here during some of his time with the Boston Red Sox
- Ryan Cusick, MLB player
- Matthew B. J. Delaney, author
- Dennis Eckersley, baseball Hall of Famer, lived on Morse Road before his years with the Boston Red Sox and on Plympton Road during and after his years with the Red Sox
- Chris Evans, actor
- Scott Evans, actor
- Henry Ford, founder of the Ford Motor Company, lived in Sudbury during parts of the 1920s and 1930s
- Meyer Abramovich Gersht, Soviet theater director who settled in the United States in 1979 and died in Sudbury in 1989
- Mike Gordon, bassist for Phish
- Robert L. Gordon III, Deputy Under Secretary of Defense
- Michelle Gorgone, Olympic snowboarder
- Edward Hallowell, psychiatrist, author, and specialist on ADHD
- Eddie House, NBA, champion with the Boston Celtics
- Ida Hultin, minister and suffragette
- Stephen Huneck, artist and writer
- Tyler Jewell, Olympic snowboarder
- Michael Kolowich, documentary filmmaker and technology entrepreneur
- William K. Lietzau Director of the US Defense Counterintelligence and Security Agency
- Israel Loring, Puritan minister who served the First Parish of Sudbury for 60-odd years
- Tony Massarotti, sports reporter for The Boston Globe
- John Nixon, General in the Continental Army during the American Revolution
- Shaquille O'Neal, four-time NBA champion, 2000 NBA MVP, fifteen-time NBA All-Star, rapper, actor, and current Inside the NBA analyst lived in Sudbury for a brief time
- Samuel Parris, Salem Witch Trials judge and Puritan minister, later preached in Wayland, which was then a part of Sudbury
- Paula Poundstone, comedian who grew up in Sudbury
- Edmund Rice, co-founder and early resident of the town from 1638–1656
- Ashley Richardson (also known as Ashley Montana), model
- Babe Ruth, baseball Hall of Famer. While with the Red Sox, he and his wife rented a small house next to Willis Pond, Sudbury, for the 1917–1918 off-season
- Matt Savage, musician
- Simon Shnapir, Olympic medalist pair skater
- Fred Smerlas, five-time NFL Pro Bowler
- Jarrod Shoemaker, Olympian and Triathlete
- Jeremy Strong, actor and Emmy winner for his role on Succession
- Callie Thorne, actress (Rescue Me)
- Amy Wilensky, writer of memoirs, grew up in Sudbury
- Laurence L. Winship, editor of The Boston Globe from 1955 to 1965.
- Thomas Winship, editor of The Boston Globe from 1965 to 1984.
