= Goodnow Library =

- U.S. National Register of Historic Places
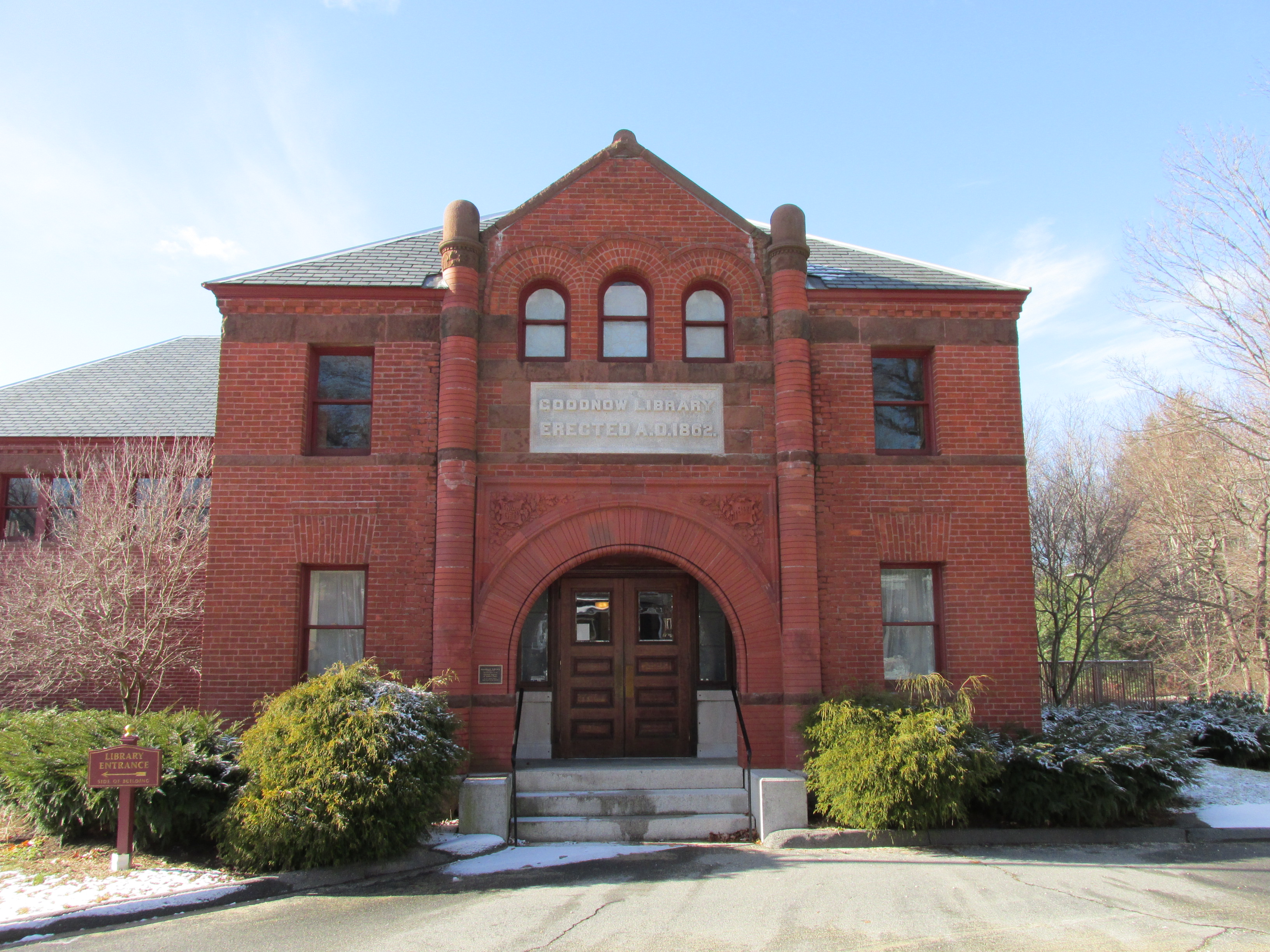
- Goodnow Library: Sudbury, Massachusetts

- Location within Massachusetts Location within the United States
- Location: 21 Concord Rd., Sudbury, Massachusetts
- Coordinates: 42°21′47″N 71°25′2″W
- Built: 1862
- Architect: Joseph R. Richards, et al.
- Architectural style: Romanesque, Octagon Mode
- NRHP reference No.: 02000549
- Added to NRHP: May 22, 2002

The Goodnow Library is an historic public library building located at 21 Concord Road in Sudbury, Massachusetts. It is named for Sudbury-native John Goodnow II, who died in 1851 and left to the town of Sudbury a 3-acre (1.2 ha) site for a library, $2,500 to build it, and $20,000 to buy books and to maintain it. Construction of the two-story octagon-shaped building began in 1862 and was finished in 1863. In the 1990s, the library was expanded to its present size, but the original octagon survives as a reading room.

On May 22, 2002, it was added to the National Register of Historic Places.

== See also ==
- National Register of Historic Places listings in Middlesex County, Massachusetts
