= Jacob Bigelow =

American physician and botanist (1787–1879)

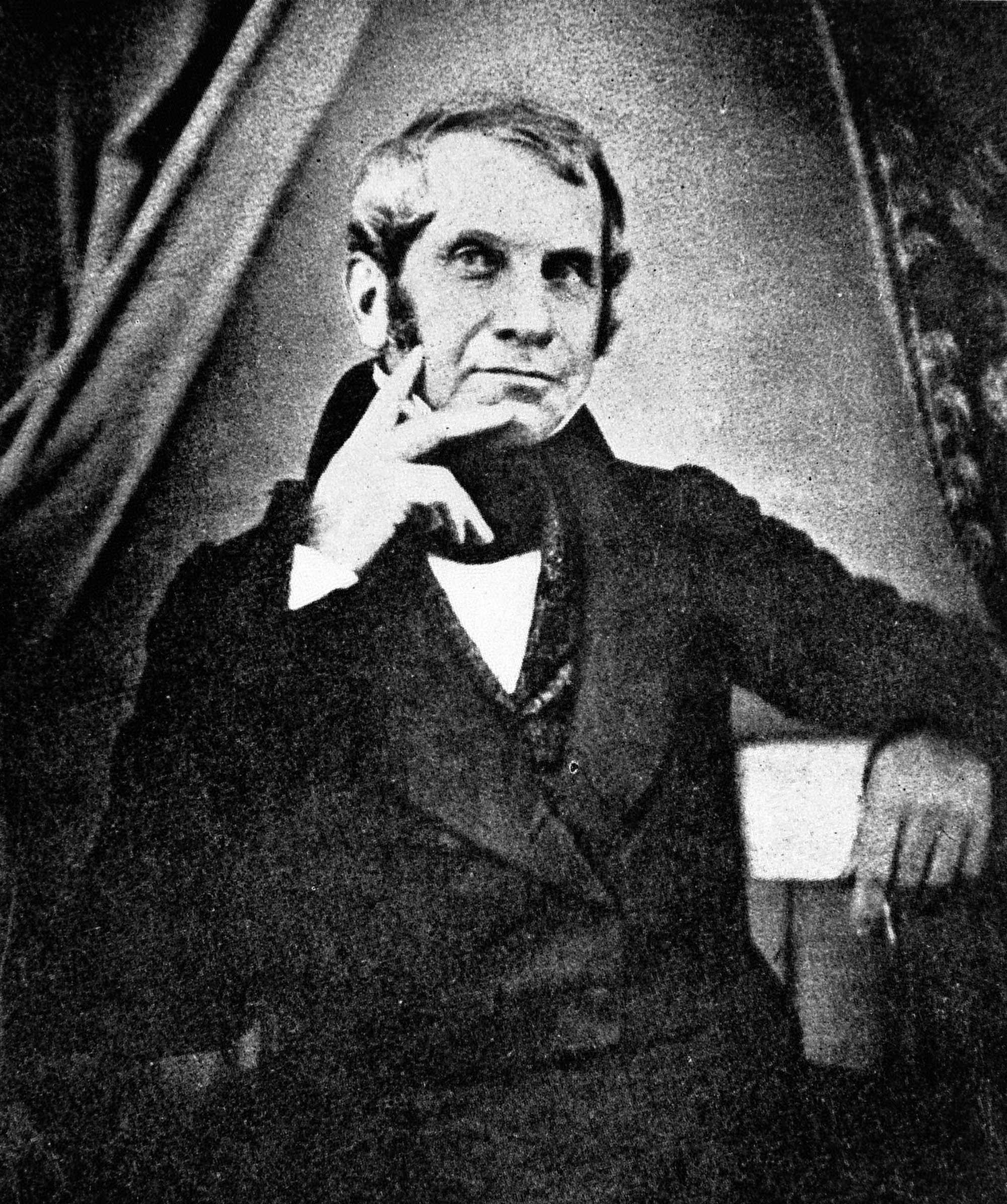
- Born: February 27, 1787; Sudbury, Massachusetts
- Died: January 10, 1879 (aged 91); Boston, Massachusetts
- Burial place: Mount Auburn Cemetery
- Education: Harvard College, A.B. (1806); University of Pennsylvania, M.D. (1810)
- Known for: Architect of Mount Auburn Cemetery
- Notable work: Florula Bostoniensis; American Medical Botany
- Children: Henry Jacob Bigelow
- Father: Reverend Jacob Bigelow (minister)

8th President of the American Academy of Arts and Sciences
- In office 1846–1863
- Preceded by: John Pickering
- Succeeded by: Asa Gray

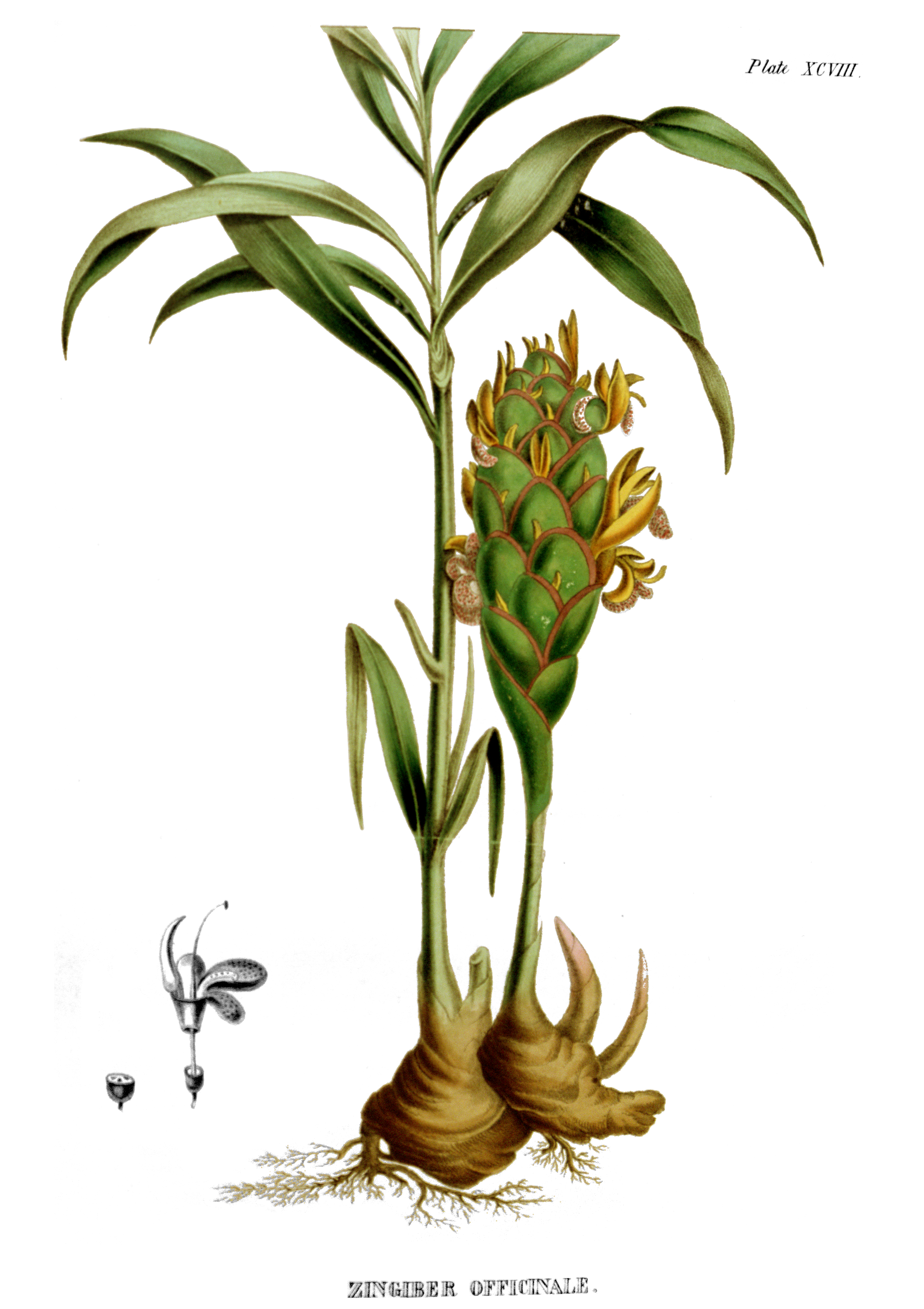
Zingiber officinale Plate 98 from Illustrations of Medical Botany

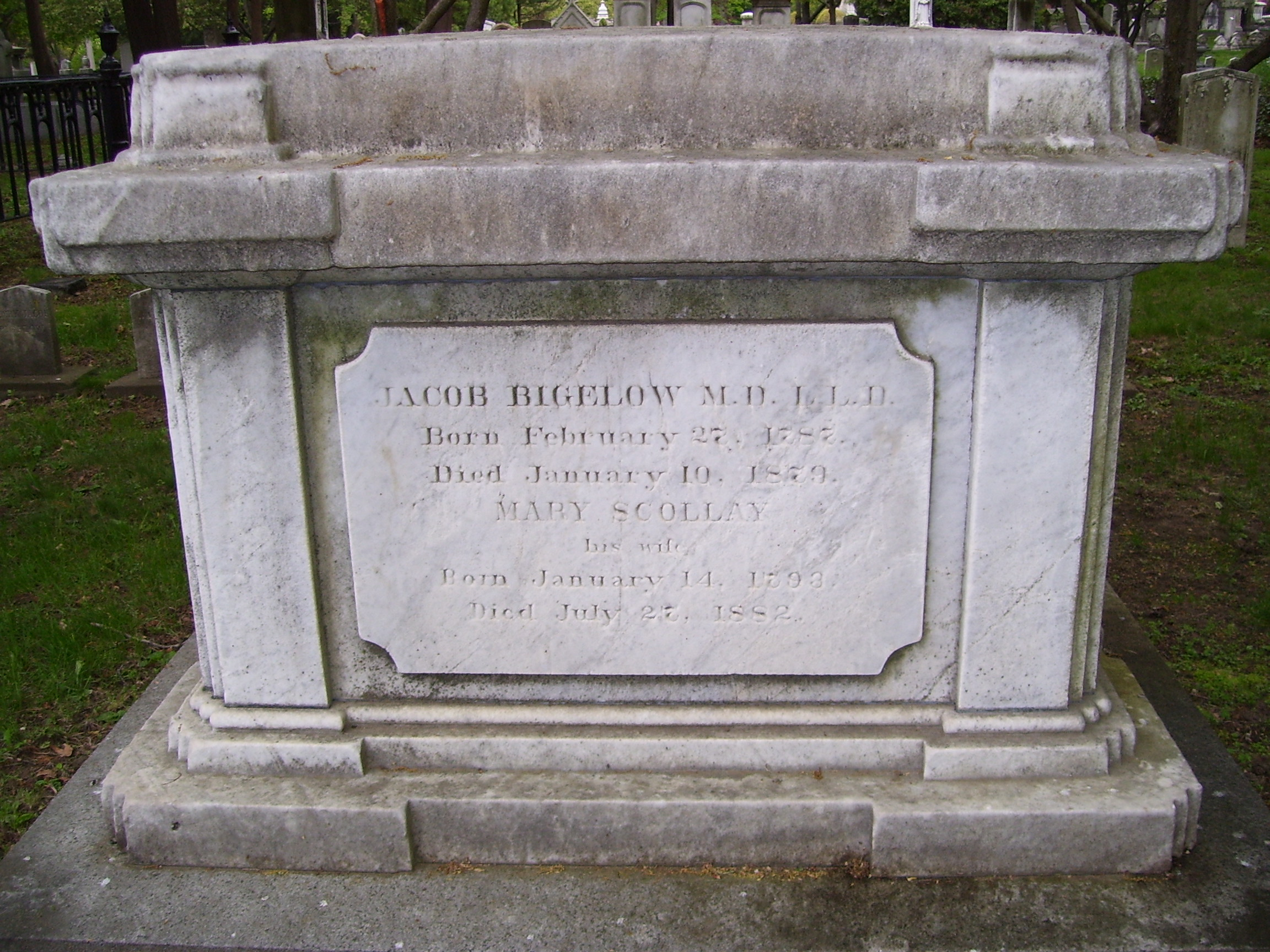
Jacob Bigelow grave at Mount Auburn Cemetery

Jacob Bigelow (February 27, 1787 – January 10, 1879) was an American medical doctor, botanist and botanical illustrator. He was architect of Mount Auburn Cemetery in Cambridge, Massachusetts (in which he is interred), husband to Mary Scollay, and the father of physician Henry Jacob Bigelow. The standard author abbreviation Bigelow is used to indicate this person as the author when citing a botanical name.

== Biography ==
Bigelow was born in Sudbury, Massachusetts, on February 27, 1787 (other sources say 1786). He was the son of Jacob Bigelow, a Congregational minister, and Elizabeth (Wells) Bigelow. He entered Harvard College at the age of sixteen, received an A.B. in 1806, and then attended medical lectures given by John Gorham at the Boston Latin School. In 1808 he left Boston to study medicine at the University of Pennsylvania where he graduated in 1810 with a degree in medicine. While at the university, he also studied botany under Benjamin Barton.

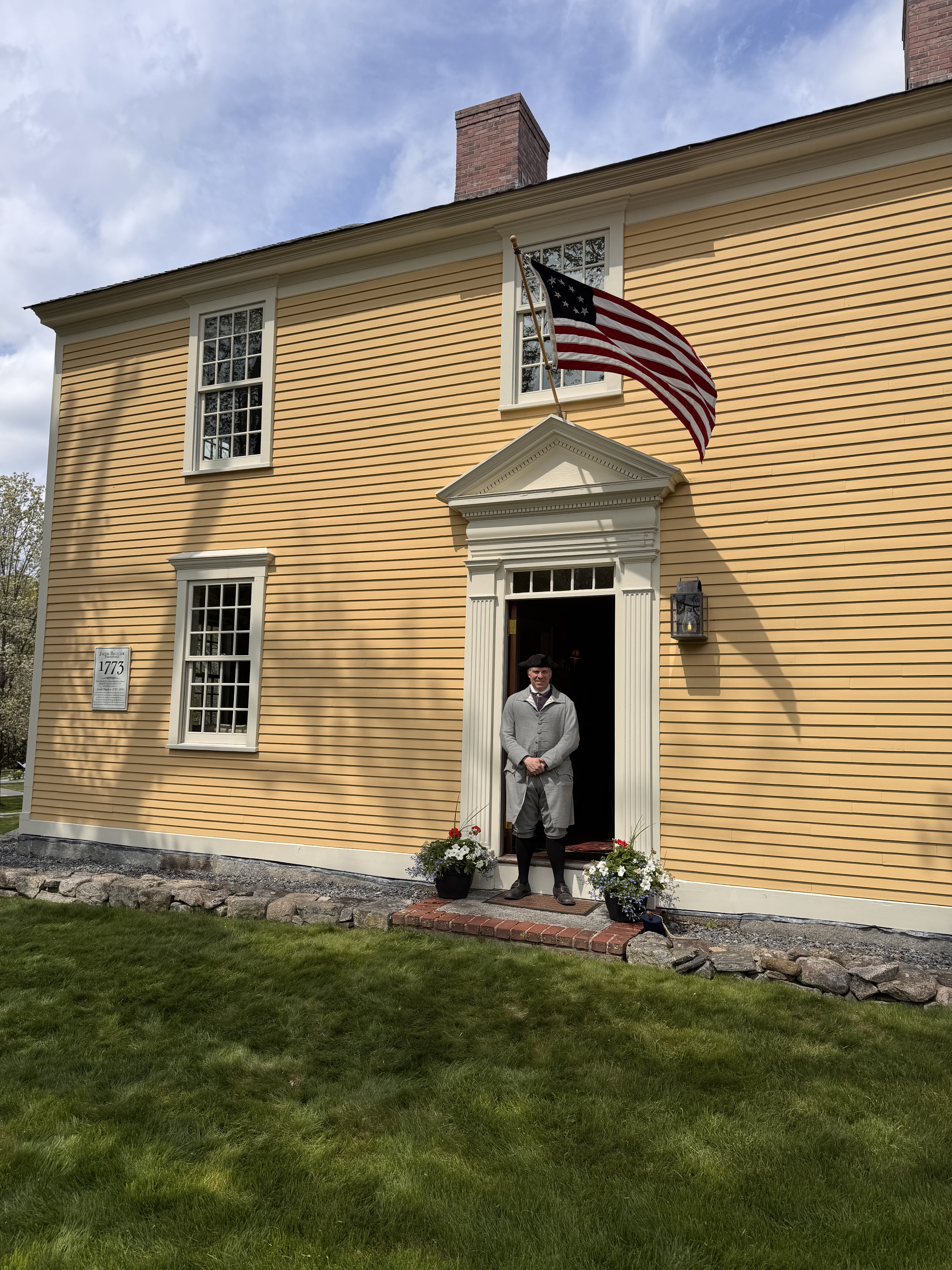
Sudbury Historical Society volunteer hosts the Sudbury 250 event (May 2, 2026) at his father's home and his birthplace, the Reverend Jacob Bigelow Parsonage 1773

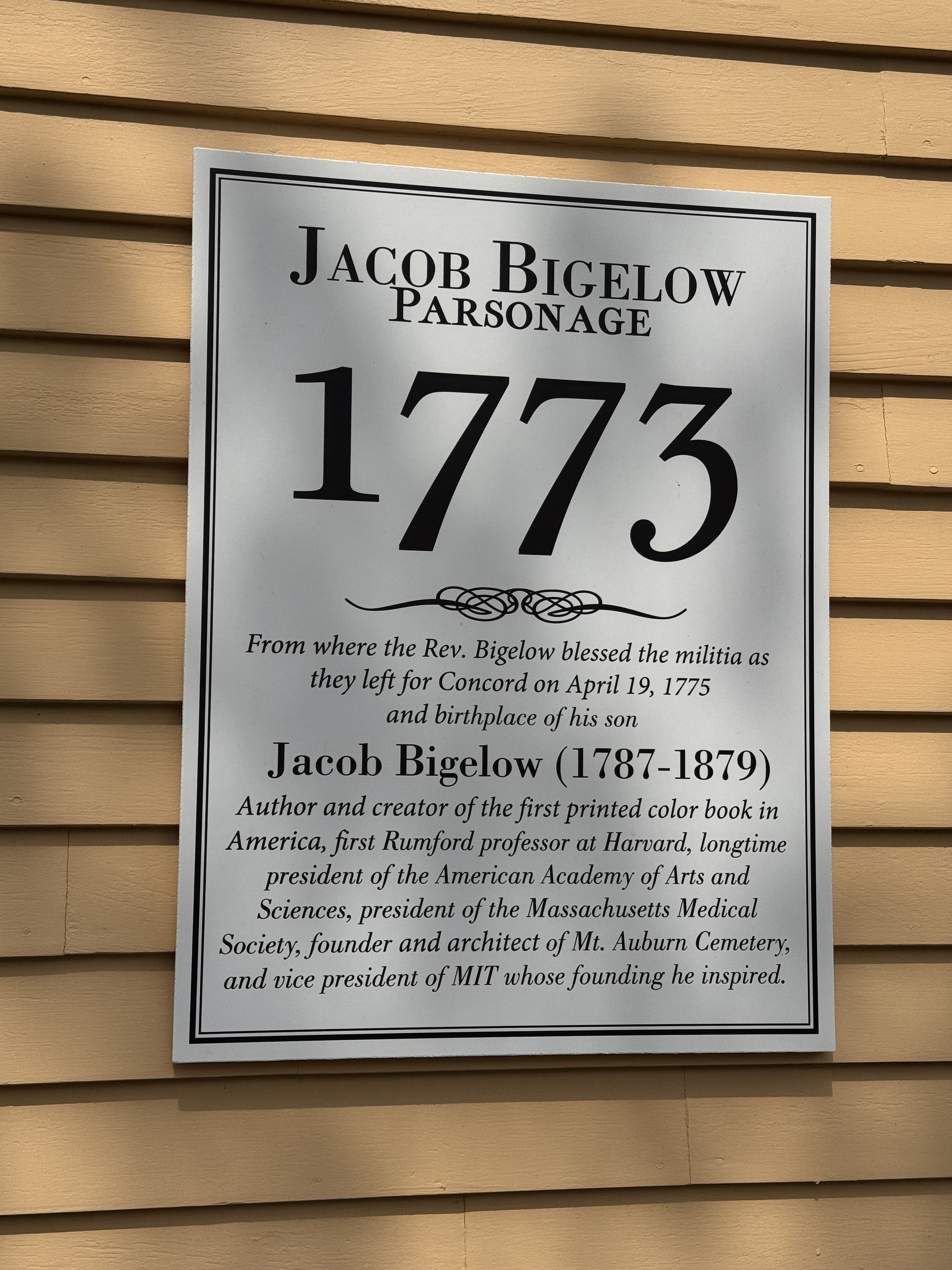
Plaque marking his birthplace, the Jacob Bigelow Parsonage in Sudbury MA built 1773

In 1811 Bigelow returned to Boston and established a successful medical practice that would make him one of the most respected local doctors for the next 60 years. In 1812 he delivered a series of botanical lectures and made a detailed survey of flora in the vicinity of Boston. He published his findings, Florula Bostoniensis, in 1814. Later, Bigelow expanded his botanic surveys into New Hampshire and Vermont. The results of this work were included in a second, expanded edition of Florula Bostoniensis (1824) which became a standard reference of New England flora for the next 25 years.

Bigelow was appointed professor of materia medica at the Harvard Medical School in 1815 and held the post until 1855. His most important botanical work was American Medical Botany, which he authored and illustrated. Published in three volumes from 1817 to 1820, Bigelow developed an improved method of reproducing his illustrations using a new aqua-tint process. In 1818, he was elected as a member to the American Philosophical Society. He was also an important contributor to the first American pharmacopoeia in 1820.

Bigelow became interested in mechanics and was appointed Rumford Professor at Harvard College, teaching applied science from 1816 to 1827. He is credited with promoting the word "technology" and in 1829 he published a treatise on mechanics and non-biological sciences, Elements of Technology. In addition, wrote on medical topics and on education, and played a major role in the establishment and design of Mt. Auburn Cemetery in Cambridge. He was a member of the American Academy of Arts and Sciences for 67 years and served as president of the organization from 1847 to 1863.

Bigelow came up with the idea for Mount Auburn Cemetery as early as 1825, though a site was not acquired until five years later. Bigelow was concerned about the unhealthiness of burials under churches as well as the possibility of running out of space. With help from the Massachusetts Horticultural Society, Mount Auburn Cemetery was founded on 70 acres (280,000 m^{2}) of land authorized by the Massachusetts Legislature for use as a garden or rural cemetery. It was dedicated in 1831 by Joseph Story, first president of the Mount Auburn Association.

Bigelow died on January 10, 1879, and was buried in Mount Auburn Cemetery.

== Critique of Benjamin Rush and Heroic Medicine ==
Bigelow came to prominence also by challenging the effectiveness of the therapeutics of the day. His Discourse on Self-Limited Diseases in which he attacked physicians' blind allegiance to drugs and medical intervention that were embodied in heroic medicine practice. To establish support, Bigelow wrote on how the outcomes among treated and untreated patients were similar, regarding the use of heroic therapies. Interventions had little effect. Bigelow's deprecations helped form a new conceptual nucleus around which medical orthodoxy could begin to redefine itself. (Paul Starr: Transformations in American Medicine)

== Selected publications ==
- An introduction to physiological & systematical botany (1814)
- Florula bostoniensis (1814, 1st Edition)
- American medical botany (1817–20) (Vol. 1–3)
- Florula bostoniensis (1824, 2nd Edition)
