= First Parish of Sudbury =

Coordinates: 42.38306°N 71.41242°W

First Parish of Sudbury refers to both an historic meetinghouse and a Unitarian Universalist congregation in Sudbury, Massachusetts, United States. The meetinghouse was built in 1797 on the site of the first meetinghouse built on the west side on the Sudbury River. The meetinghouse was designed by Captain Thomson and built at a cost of $6,025.93. It was paid for by the Town of Sudbury to be the meetinghouse for both Town Meetings and parish worship. Some documents use "in" instead of "of" as in First Parish in Sudbury.

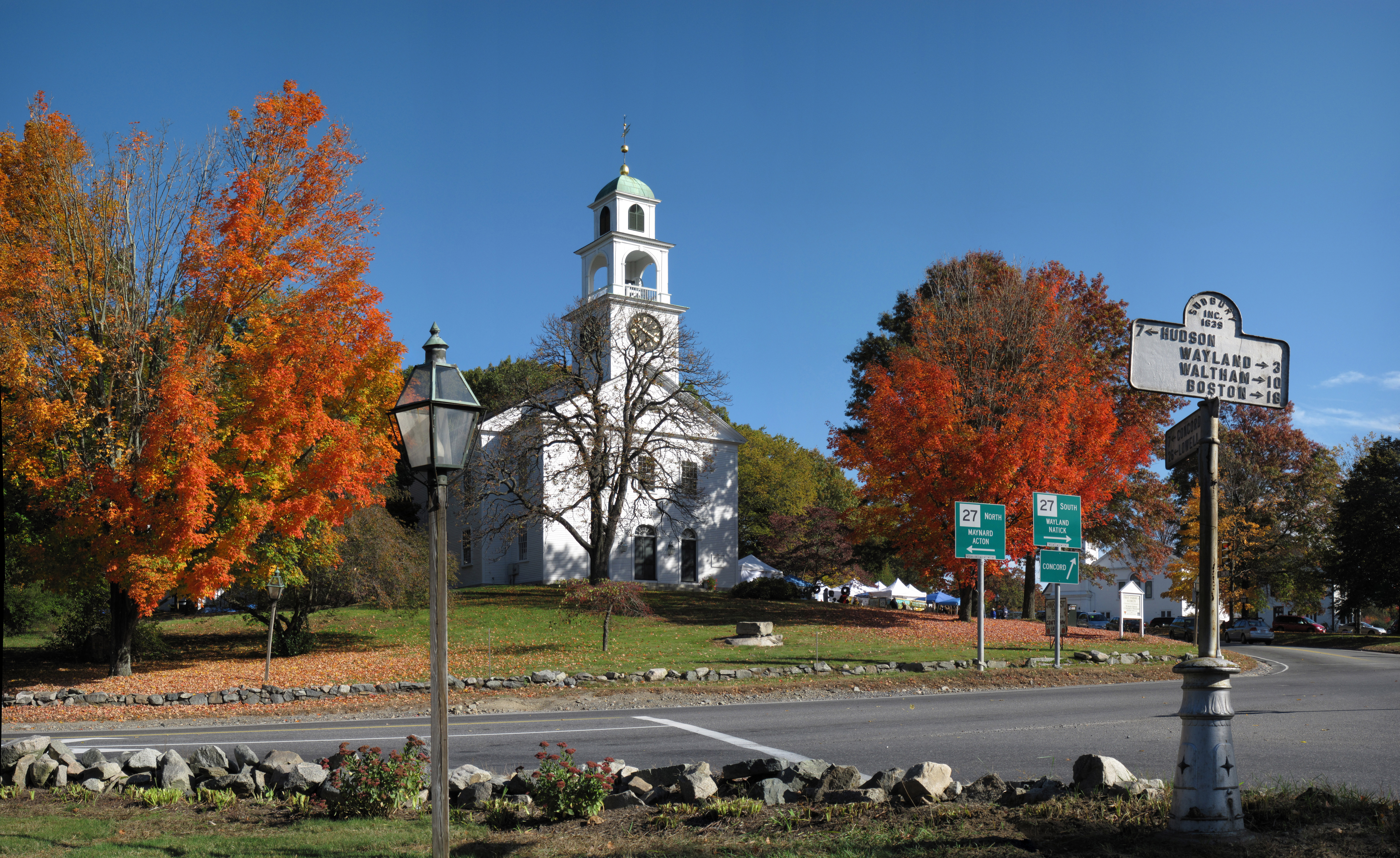
First Parish Meetinghouse

The original meetinghouse on the site, built in 1723, was the first building in the Sudbury Center Historic District. The current meetinghouse is prominent at the center of the district.

On April 19, 1775, the town's Minutemen mustered at First Parish, known at the time as the West Side meetinghouse. The company, led by Captain John Nixon, fought at the Battles of Lexington and Concord.

The meetinghouse continued to be used for both Town meetings and worship until the Town built it Town House in 1846, 10 years after the separation of Church and State in Sudbury.

== History of the Congregation ==
The First Parish of Sudbury is the fourth incarnation of the congregation that was first gathered in 1640 as the Church in Sudbury. The first deacon in 1640 was Edmund Rice and first meetinghouse was built at the site of the Old North Cemetery in what is now Wayland, Massachusetts. Due to the hardship of crossing the inhabitants of the west side of Sudbury River petitioned the Massachusetts General Court to build a second meetinghouse in 1707. Although it was initially denied, the new meetinghouse was ordered built in 1721. The West Side Meetinghouse was built in 1723 the Rocky Plain, which is now the current town center of Sudbury. The East Side meeting house was then moved to the current Wayland center. With two meetinghouses, the territorial parish was split into the Easterly Precinct and the Westerly Precinct, distinct from the Town. When East Sudbury was incorporated in 1780, the parish once again became a territorial parish within the Town of Sudbury. In 1836, with the separation of church and state, Sudbury divided and formed two distinct corporations, one municipal and the other parochial.

The congregation split again in 1837 due to the divisions between members influenced by Transcendentalism and the Unitarian movement and the more Orthodox members.

After the split, the more Orthodox members of the original congregation formed a new church that is now known as Memorial Congregational Church (UCC), which stands about 1.5 mile south of First Parish, near the intersection of Concord Rd and Boston Post Rd in Sudbury. In a display case in that church is the original Alter Bible, which Rev. Rufus Hurlbut took with him on the morning of the split. Next to the Bible is a small card describing the events of that day.

In 1904, First Parish called its first Ida Hultin to be its first woman minister.

== List of First Parish ministers until the 1837 split ==
- 1639-1678 Edward Brown (died 1678)
- 1678-1707 James Sherman (dismissed)
- 1705-1772 Israel Loring (died 1772)
- 1772-1816 Jacob Bigelow (died 1816)
- 1816-1839 Rufus Hurlbut (died 1839), from 1837 minister of the Orthodox Congregational Church

== Recent Years ==
Rev. Kathleen Hepler started as minister in 2022. In line with other member congregations of the UUA, the congregation adheres to the Unitarian Universalist faith and affirms the Seven Principles of Unitarian Universalism.
