= Sudbury Center Historic District =

Historic district in Massachusetts, United States

- U.S. National Register of Historic Places
- U.S. Historic district
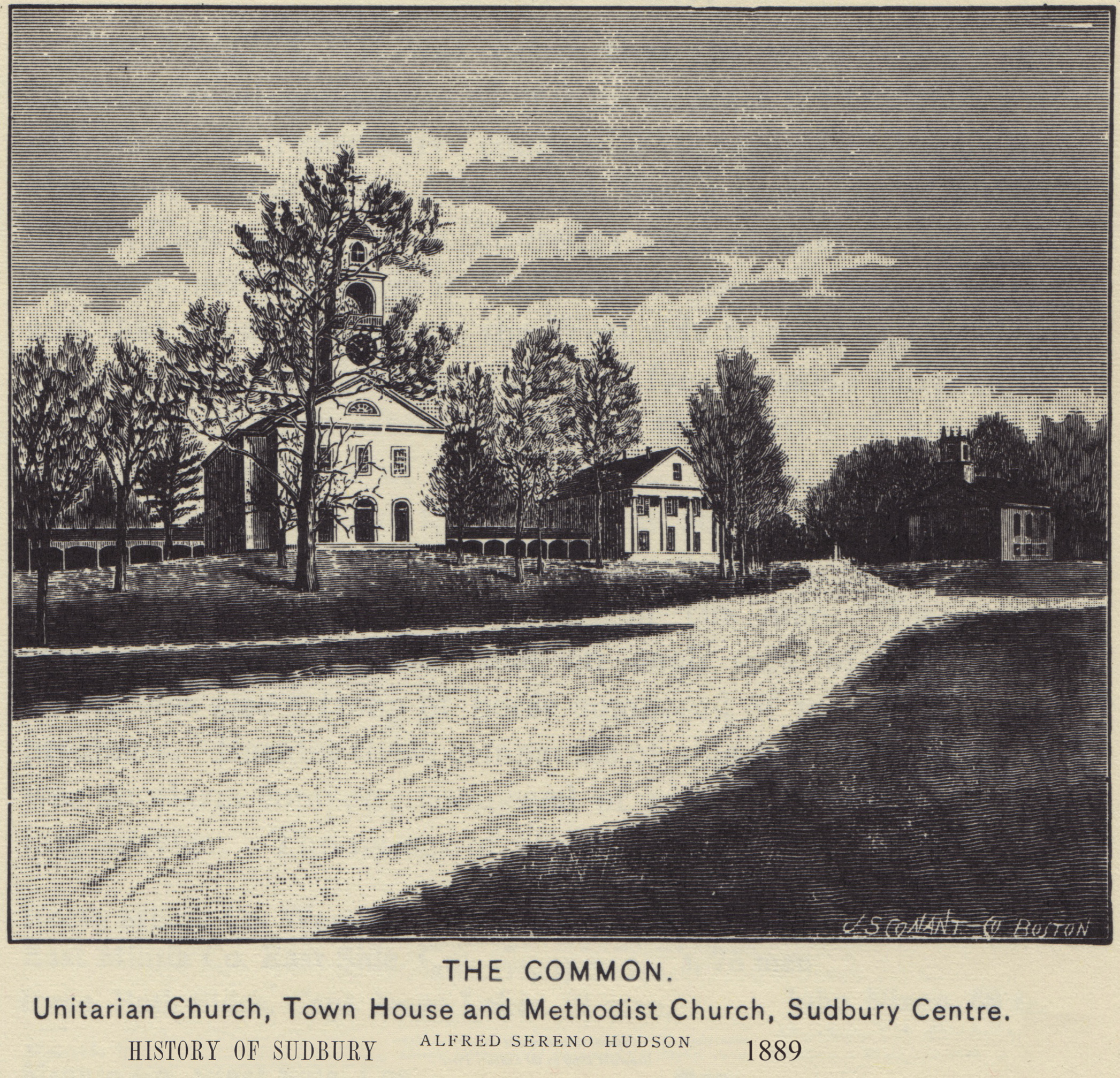
- First Parish of Sudbury

- Location within Massachusetts Location within the United States
- Location: Sudbury, Massachusetts
- Coordinates: 42°22′53″N 71°24′18″W
- Area: 193.6 acres (0.783 km^{2})
- Architect: Multiple
- Architectural style: Mid 19th Century Revival, Late 19th And 20th Century Revivals, Federal
- NRHP reference No.: 76000277
- Added to NRHP: July 14, 1976

The Sudbury Center Historic District is a historic district on Concord and Old Sudbury Roads in Sudbury, Massachusetts. It was listed on the National Register of Historic Places in 1976. In 1976, it included 80 buildings over 193.6 acres (0.783 km^{2}).

The Town of Sudbury lists among historically significant buildings in the area the Israel Loring Parsonage (c. 1730) and the First Parish Meetinghouse (1797), as well as several 19th-century buildings and the Revolutionary Cemetery. The Hosmer House (1793), standing at the corner of Concord and Old Sudbury Roads is a typical residence of the early 19th century. It includes representations of Mid 19th Century Revival, Late 19th and 20th Century Revivals, and Federal architecture styles.

On April 19, 1775, the town's Minutemen mustered at First Parish, known at the time as the West Side meetinghouse. The company, led by Captain John Nixon, fought at the Battles of Lexington and Concord.

== See also ==
- National Register of Historic Places listings in Middlesex County, Massachusetts
