= Matthew B. J. Delaney =

American novelist

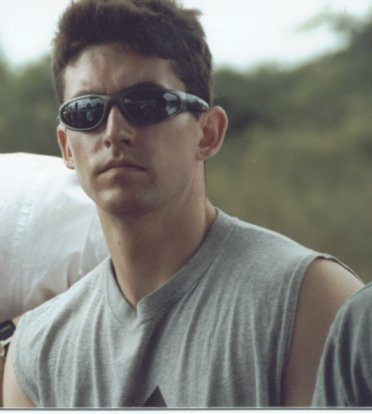
- Delaney in Belize
- Born: Matthew Bret Jackson Delaney; Boston, Massachusetts, U.S.
- Education: Dartmouth College; Harvard Kennedy School; New York City Police Academy
- Occupations: Novelist, Police Officer
- Writing career
- Genres: Science fiction, Mystery fiction
- Notable works: Jinn; Black Rain; The Memory Agent

Matthew B. J. Delaney (also known as; Matthew B Delaney) is an American writer and member of the New York City Police Department. Originally from Sudbury, Massachusetts, Delaney now resides in New York City.

Delaney is an alumnus of Dartmouth College in New Hampshire, and received an MPA from the Harvard Kennedy School. His debut novel Jinn won the International Horror Guild Award in 2004 and was well received by both critics and readers. The film rights for his first book were sold to Touchstone Pictures, before Delaney even finished writing it.

The rights to his second novel, Genome, Inc., were purchased in German by Bastei Lübbe in November 2009 and published as Golem in Germany in 2012.

Delaney is a decorated member of the NYPD, where he has risen to the rank of captain. He continues to write in his spare time.

== Works ==
- Jinn. New York: St. Martin's Press, in 2003, ISBN 978-0-312-27670-6
- Golem. Köln: Bastei Lübbe in 2012, ISBN 978-3-4041-6672-5
- Black Rain. 47North, in 2016, ISBN 978-1-5039-3701-7
- The Memory Agent. 47North, in 2017, ISBN 978-1-5039-4269-1
