= Israel Loring =

British American Puritan minister (1682–1772)

- Born: April 6, 1682; Hull, Massachusetts; British America
- Died: March 9, 1772 (aged 89); Sudbury, Massachusetts, US
- Education: Harvard University
- Occupation: Minister

Israel Loring (April 6, 1682 – March 9, 1772) was a British American Puritan clergyman who preached at the First Parish of Sudbury in Massachusetts for some 65 years. An elementary school in Sudbury is named in his honor. The Loring Parsonage in the Sudbury Center Historic District houses the Sudbury History Center and Museum.

== Biography ==
Loring was born in Hull, Massachusetts, on April 6, 1682, according to his diary (town records give a different date). His parents were John Loring, an immigrant from England who at one point served in the Massachusetts General Court, and Rachel (Wheatley) Buckland. Mentored by Increase Mather, he studied for the ministry, preached his first sermon at Scituate in 1703, and graduated from Harvard College in 1704. He preached in the town of Sudbury, Massachusetts, for the first time on July 29, 1705. Two years later, after a series of short-term engagements by the town following its dismissal of long-time pastor James Sherman, the Sudbury congregation voted to hire him as full-time minister on October 22, 1707. Loring had been ordained on November 20, 1706. He served Sudbury as its primary minister until his death 65 years later. When the town amicably split into two parishes on opposite sides of the Sudbury River, Loring relocated to the west side in July 1723 and continued his ministry. His congregation of 120 adults tripled in size, and he baptized a total of 1,400 children.

Loring was a moderate Puritan who rejected both latitudinarianism and revivalism. Respected by his contemporaries, he delivered a sermon by invitation to the Massachusetts General Court in 1737, which was printed and published that same year. He supported John Leverett, the first person who was not a minister to be elected president of Harvard. He opposed the Great Awakening, publicly denounced revivalist preacher George Whitefield, and prohibited itinerant lay preachers from addressing his congregation.

A Black enslaved man named Simeon was born and raised in Loring's household. Simeon died of gastrointestinal disease at the age of 22 in 1755. Loring noted in his diary of Simeon: "He was greatly beloved by the family, and [his passing] has drowned us in tears." Simeon was interred in the cemetery in the Sudbury Center Historic District, and his gravestone featured a lengthy inscription.

Loring married Mary Hayman in 1709 and they had seven children during 60 years of marriage.

On June 4, 1770, Loring was dined at Faneuil Hall by the Sons of Liberty (he was sympathetic to the cause of opposition to British tyranny) and was fêted as the oldest minister in America. He died on March 9, 1772, at his home in Sudbury and was interred in the Brown family tomb in what is now the Revolutionary War Cemetery in Sudbury, alongside his wife who had pre-deceased him in 1769.

== Legacy ==
The Israel Loring Elementary School in Sudbury was named in his honor. Many of his handwritten journals and letters are held at the Goodnow Library. The Loring Parsonage, which served as Loring's home for nearly 50 years, stands in the Sudbury Center Historic District. Restored and reopened in July 2021, this historic building houses the Sudbury History Center and Museum.

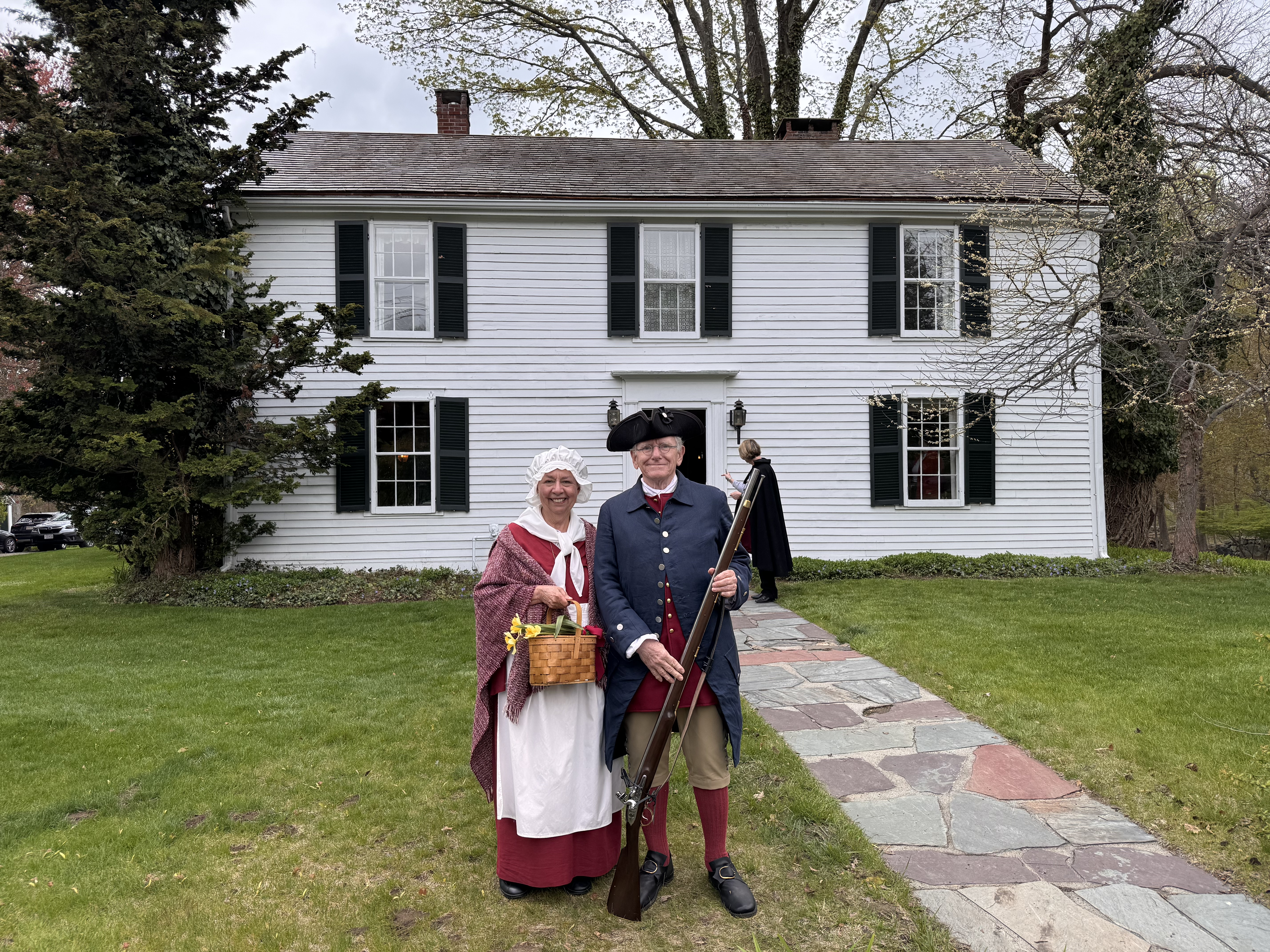
Sudbury Historical Society volunteers host the Sudbury 250 event (May 2, 2026) at Loring's Rocky Plains House c.1720

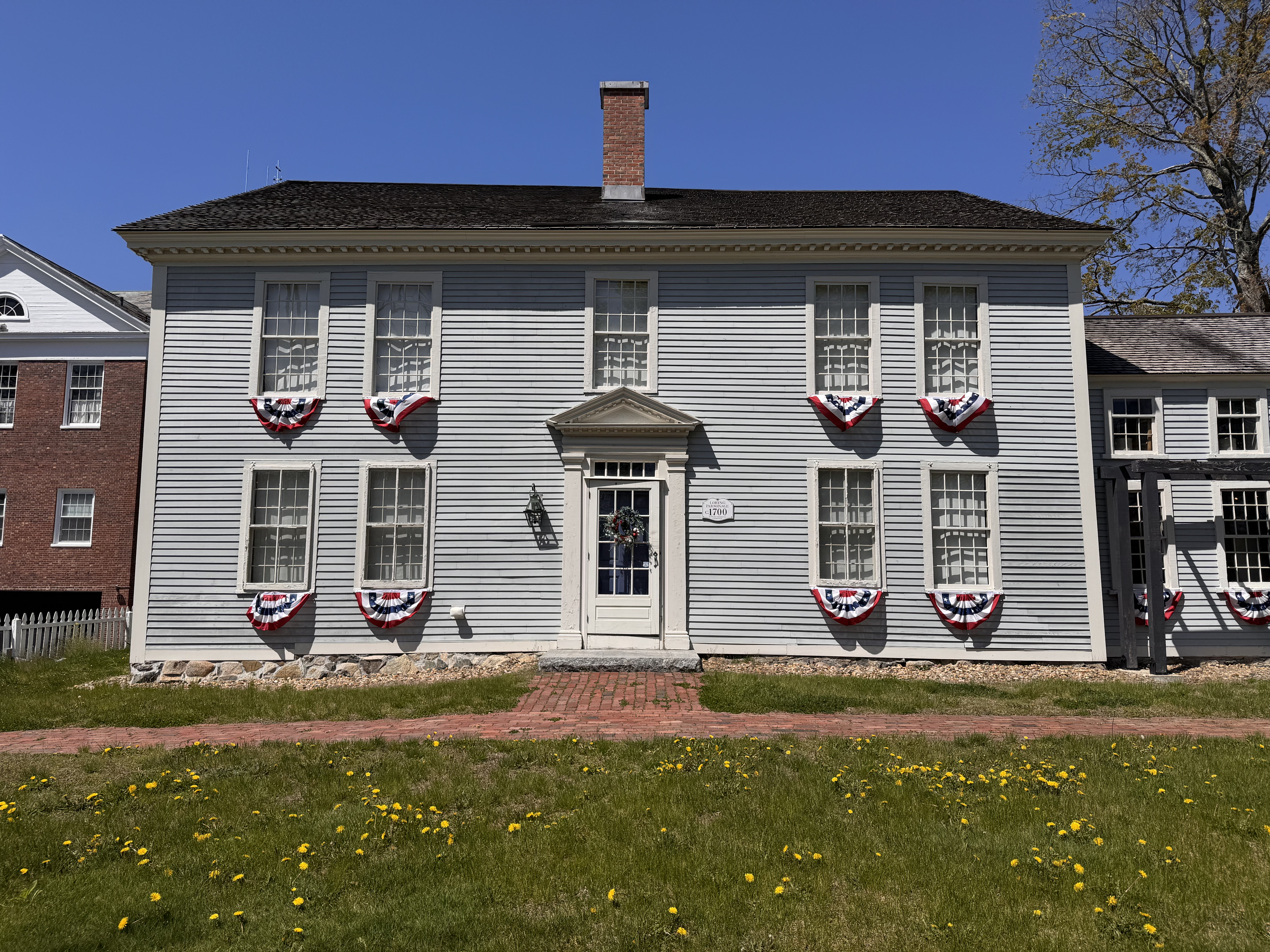
The Loring Parsonage c. 1720 now houses the Sudbury History Center and Museum and also the Sudbury Historical Society

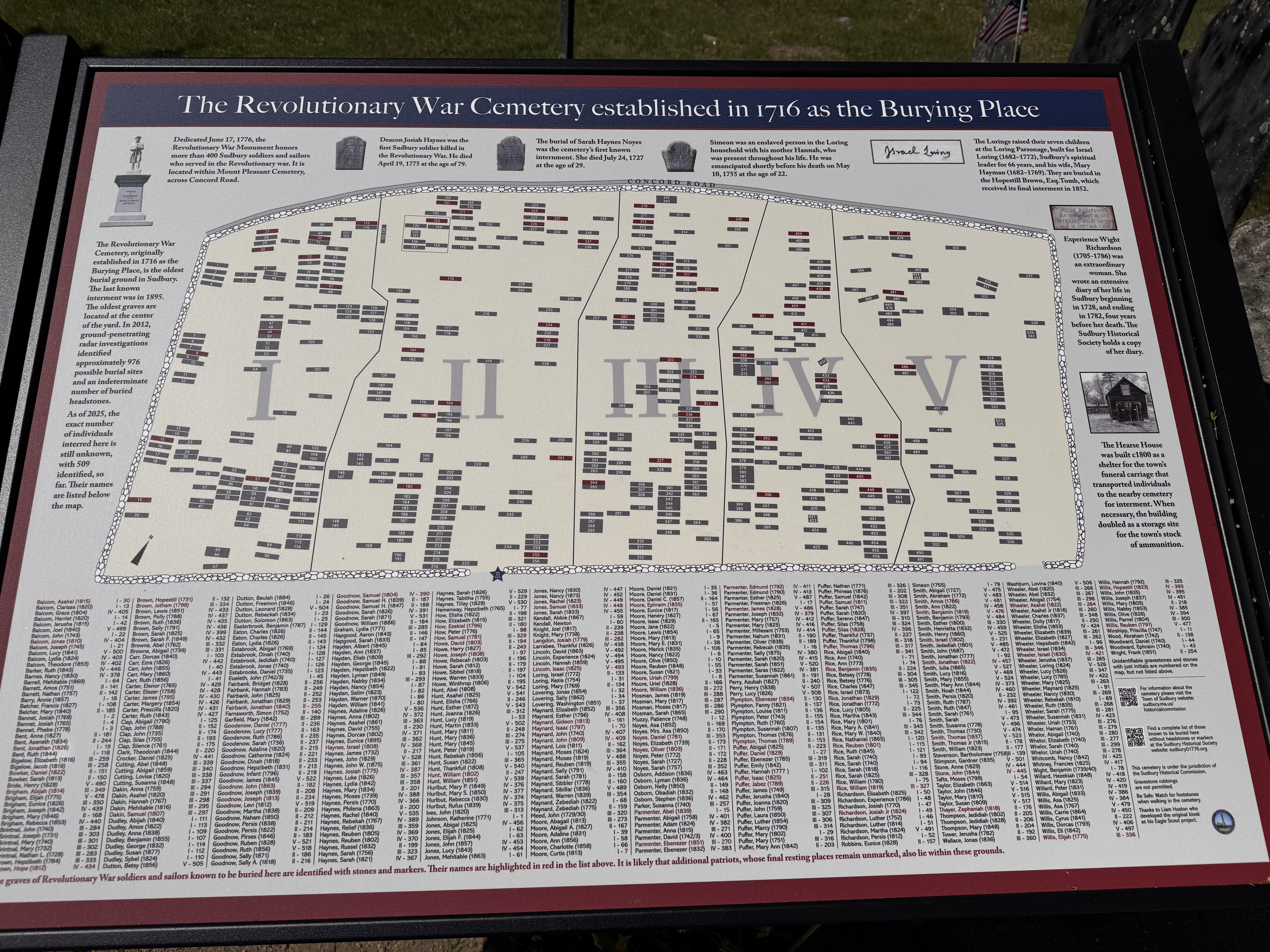
The upper right corner of the kiosk of the Revolutionary War Cemetery, Sudbury Massachusetts has a reproduction of Loring's signature and states that he and his wife are buried in the Hopestill Brown Esq. Tomb there

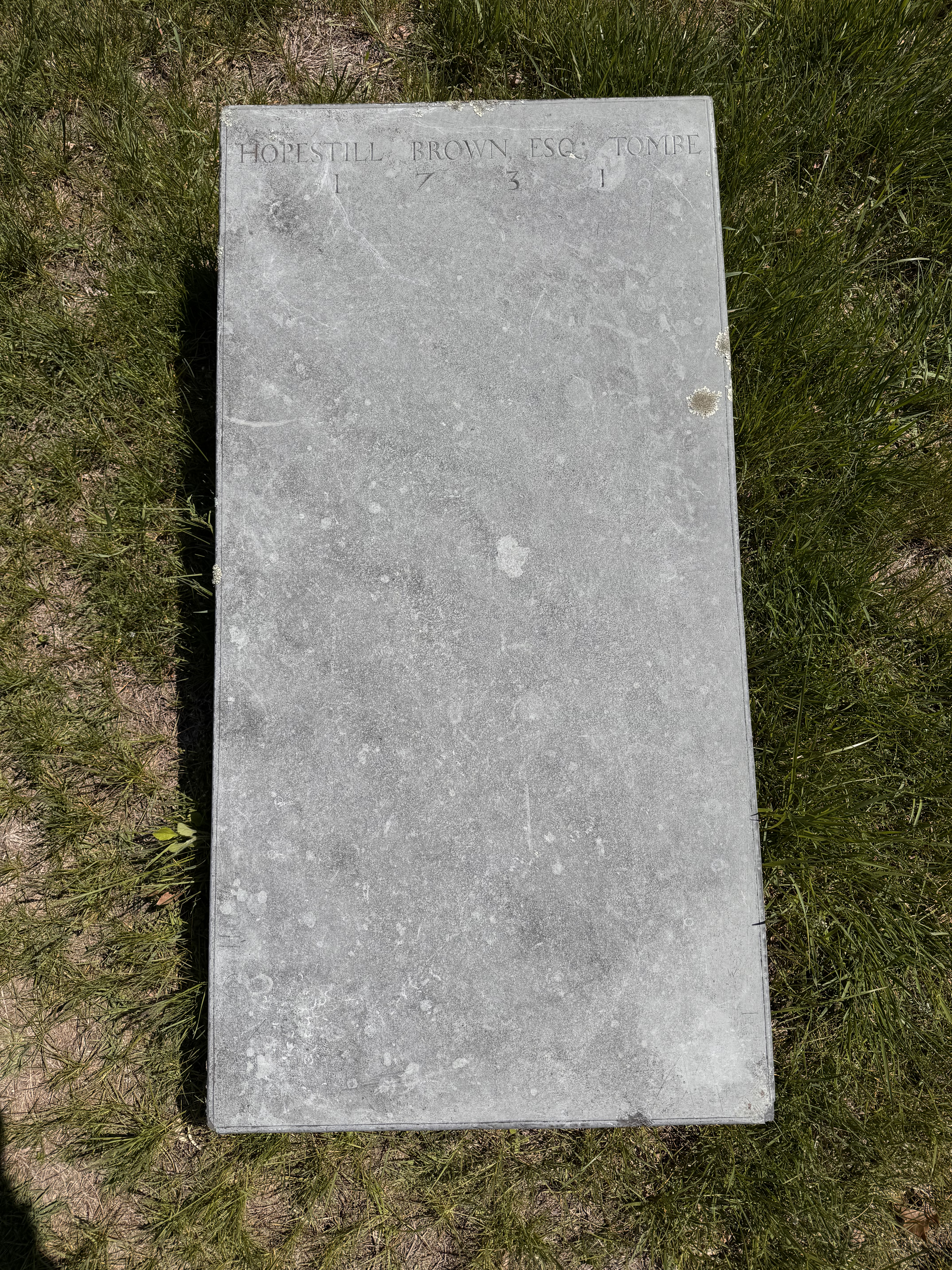
The tomb mentioned in the kiosk statement pictured above is the final resting place of Israel and Mary Loring.

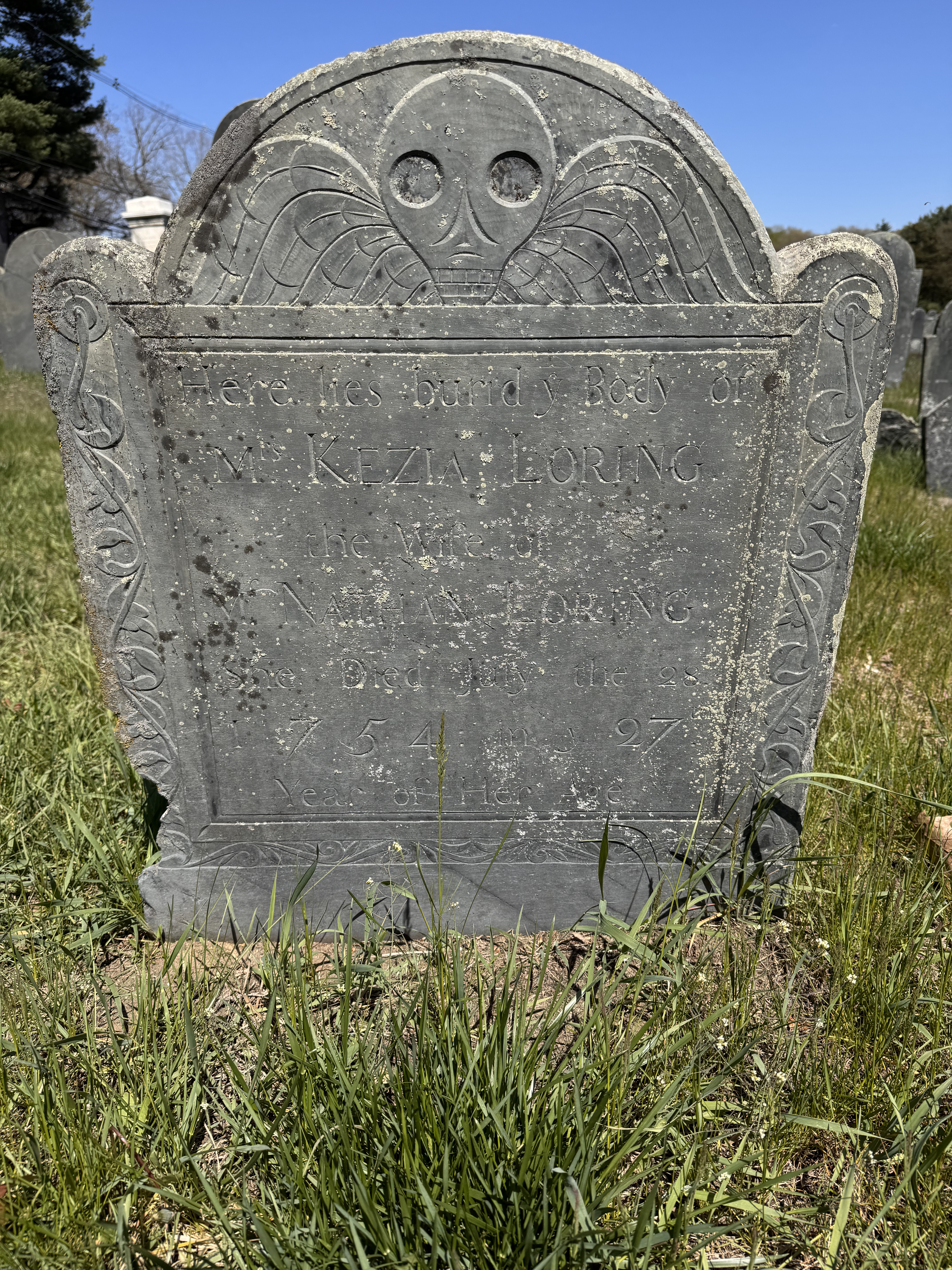
Headstone of Rev. Loring's daughter-in-law, Kezia (or Keziah) Loring née Woodward in the Revolutionary War Cemetery, Sudbury MA
