= Ida Hultin =

American Unitarian minister and advocate for woman suffrage

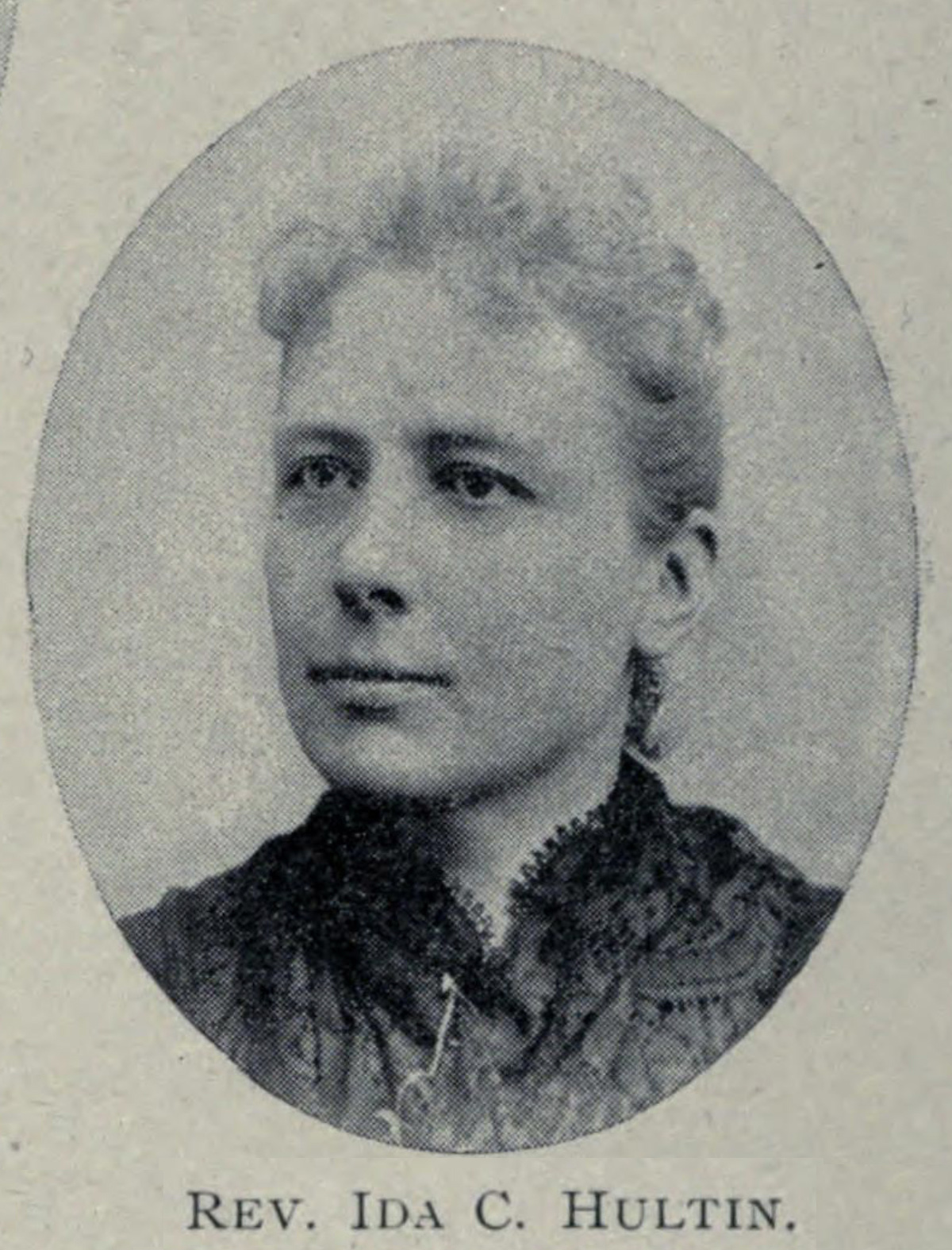
Rev. Ida C. Hultin

Ida Constance Hultin (often anglicized as Hulton; 1858–1938) was an American Unitarian minister and advocate for woman suffrage. Born in Michigan, she served Unitarian congregations in Iowa, Illinois, and Massachusetts and spoke frequently on women's rights. Hultin addressed the 1893 Congress of Women at the Chicago World's Fair (presenting on "Woman and Religion") and later testified at a 1894 U.S. Senate hearing on woman suffrage. She continued to speak at suffrage conventions until the passage of the 19th amendment.

== Early life and education ==
Hultin was born in Michigan to Dr. Karl Constance Hultin (who was born and educated in Sweden) and Susan Parkins Soman (born and educated in Michigan). She attended Michigan High School and then the University of Michigan. Hultin was among the first women admitted to the Unitarian ministry: she began serving in Iowa under the mentorship of the pioneering woman minister Mary Safford. She was a member of the Iowa Sisterhood.

== Ministry and activism ==
Hultin's ministerial career began in Iowa. In 1884 she was called to the Unitarian congregation in Algona, Iowa, and in 1886 was ordained as minister of the Des Moines Unitarian church, where she served for five years. She later moved to Illinois, serving as minister in Moline from 1891 to 1900. In 1900 Hultin relocated to Massachusetts: she led the Allston (Boston) Unitarian congregation from 1900 to 1903 and then First Parish of Sudbury from 1904 until her retirement in 1916. Throughout her career she was a noted public lecturer and suffrage advocate. In addition to her 1893 Chicago address, she spoke at numerous suffrage meetings and conventions. For example, at the 1907 Maryland suffrage convention she delivered addresses at both evening sessions, and at New Hampshire's 1909 convention she spoke alongside other suffrage leaders.

Hultin retired in 1916 and moved to Lincoln, Massachusetts. She died there in December 1938.

== See also ==
- History of Woman Suffrage - Six volume work that contains several references to Hultin
