= Sudbury Public Schools =

Public elementary school district in Sudbury, Massachusetts

Location
- 67 Fairbank Road; Sudbury, Massachusetts 01776 United States
- Coordinates: 42.3932°N 71.4437°W

District information
- Type: Public school district
- Grades: PK–8

Other information
- Website: www.sudbury.k12.ma.us

Sudbury Public Schools is a public elementary school district in Sudbury, Massachusetts, in Middlesex County, serving students in grades PK–8.

== Schools ==
- 67 Ephraim Curtis Middle School
- Josiah Haynes Elementary School
- Israel Loring Elementary School
- General John Nixon Elementary School
- Peter Noyes Elementary School

== Namesakes ==
- Ephraim Curtis, born in 1672, was a lieutenant, a trader, and a negotiator with the Nipmuc tribe.
- Josiah Haynes, born in 1696, was a church deacon and farmer. He was killed by the British in Lexington as he marched with the militia at age 79.
- Israel Loring, born in 1682, was a Puritan minister who lived next to the Town Hall and served Sudbury for some 65 years.
- General John Nixon, born in 1724, fought in the French and Indian Wars as a young man; later, as Colonel, he led men at the Battle of Bunker Hill.
- Peter Noyes, who arrived from England in 1638, was one of the first people to settle in Sudbury.
