= Charles H. Bigelow House =

Historic house in Ohio, United States

- U.S. National Register of Historic Places
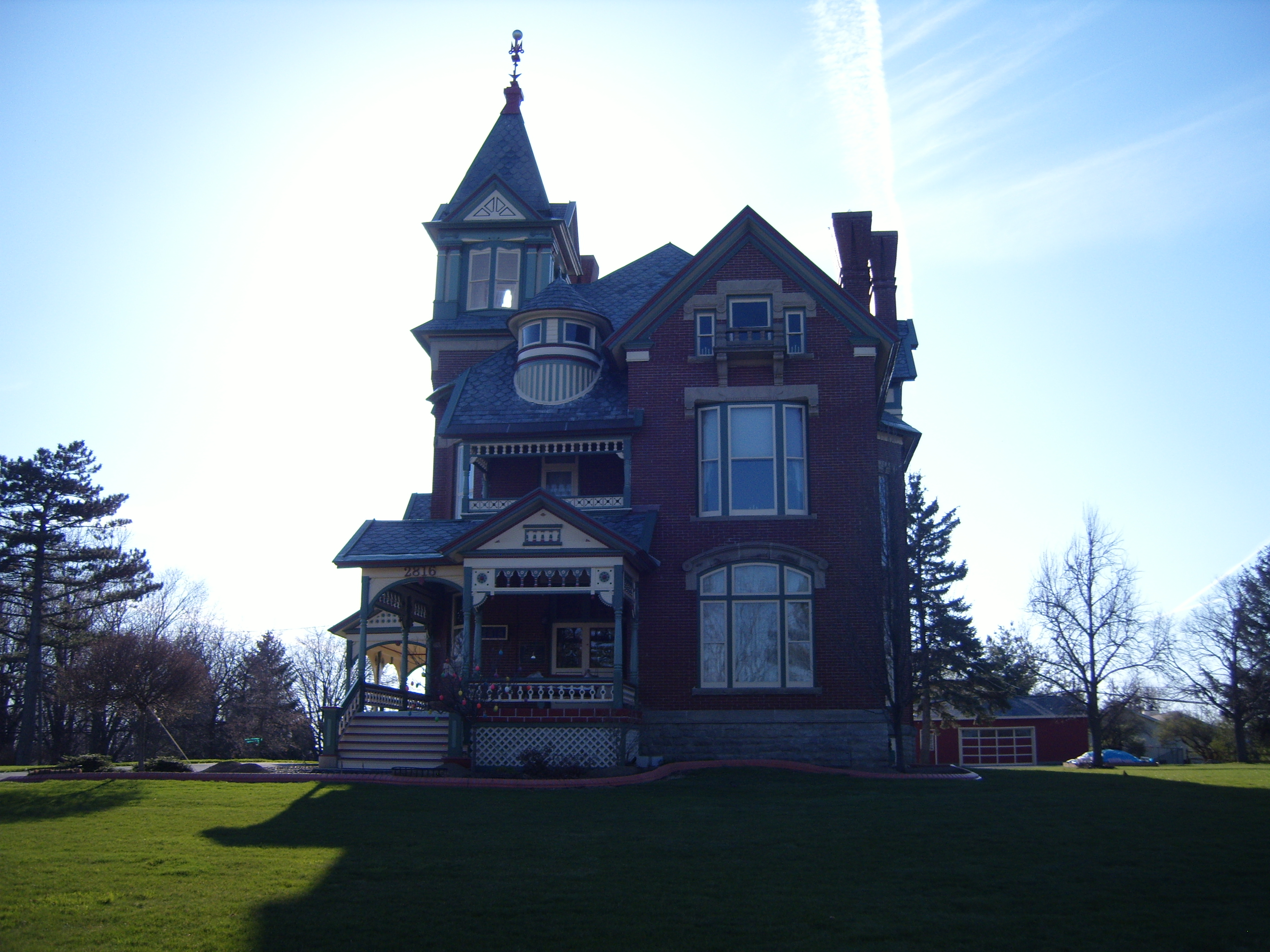
- Front of the house

- Location within Ohio Location within the United States
- Location: 2816 N. Main St., Findlay, Ohio
- Coordinates: 41°4′28″N 83°39′2″W
- Area: 1.3 acres (0.53 ha)
- Built: 1888
- Architect: Henry Oswald Wurmser
- Architectural style: Queen Anne, Stick/Eastlake
- NRHP reference No.: 06000200
- Added to NRHP: March 29, 2006

The Charles H. Bigelow House is a historic building in Findlay, Ohio, United States, that was listed on the National Register of Historic Places on March 29, 2006. The home is considered to be a fine example of a Painted Lady, or polychrome Victorian architecture.

== History ==
The house was built between 1888 and 1889 during a period of rapid economic growth in Findlay. The 7,500-square-foot (700 m^{2}) house was designed by architect Henry Oswald Wurmser in the Queen Anne, Stick/Eastlake style. The owner, Charles Henry Bigelow, was a son of an early settler and community leader, who built on his father's achievements to become a successful farmer, livestock breeder and business leader. Bigelow was one of many Findlay residents whose fortunes grew along with the booming regional economy of the late 19th century, spurred by discovery of gas fields nearby. Bigelow later married May Vance, a relative of former Ohio governor Joseph Vance.

The construction of the home during the gas boom of Findlay is evident by the many gas using fixtures original to the home. It originally had seven gas fireplaces, and many gas lamps. The original oriental brass light in the newel post is shaped like a dragon which breathed fire when the gas was lit. All have since been converted to wood-burning fireplaces or electric lights. In 1989, the exterior of the home was restored and repainted in a cracker cream, cottage red, village green, and lighter green in order to highlight the woodwork.

In 1992, the house appeared in Elizabeth Pomada and Michael Larsen's America's Painted Ladies: The Ultimate Celebration of our Victorians, a catalogue of exceptional polychrome Victorian or Edwardian homes. In 1995, the house appeared as a featured act of David Copperfield's The Magic of David Copperfield XVI: Unexplained Forces, although its history was falsified and it was referred to as the "Barclay House".
