= Dr. Henry Jacob Bigelow House =

Historic house in Massachusetts, United States

- U.S. National Register of Historic Places
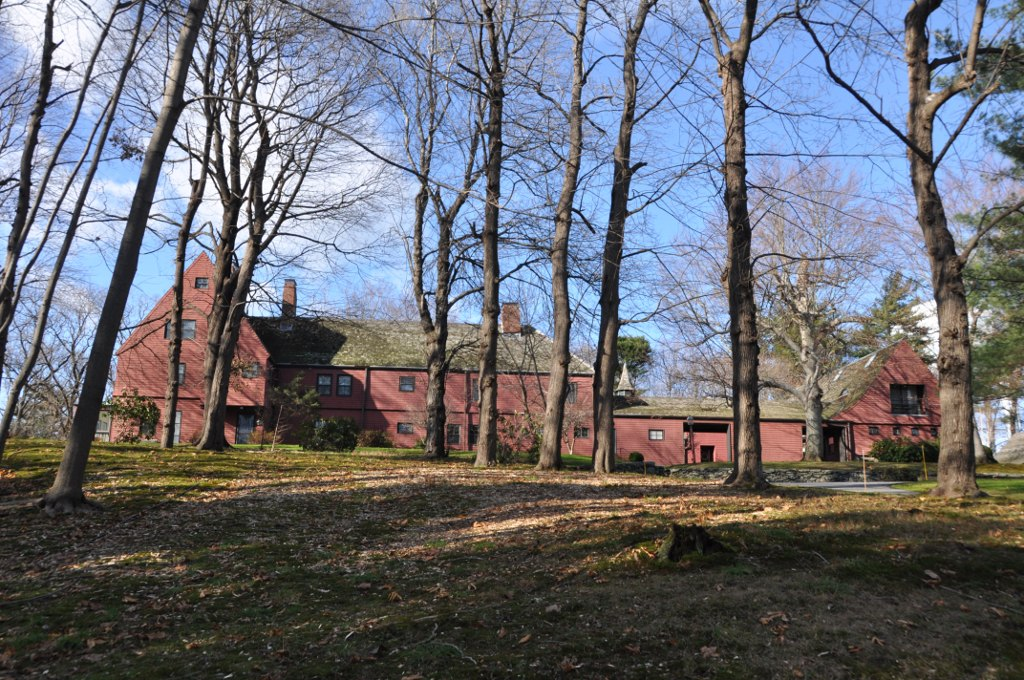

- Location within Massachusetts Location within the United States
- Location: 72-80 Ober Rd., Newton, Massachusetts
- Coordinates: 42°18′9″N 71°11′13″W
- Area: 5 acres (2.0 ha)
- Built: 1887
- Architect: Henry Hobson Richardson
- Architectural style: Shingle Style
- NRHP reference No.: 76000266
- Added to NRHP: January 1, 1976

The Dr. Henry Jacob Bigelow House is a historic house at 72-80 Ober Road in the Oak Hill village of Newton, Massachusetts. Built in 1887, it is one of the last private residences designed by noted American architect Henry Hobson Richardson. It was converted into condominiums in the 1980s by the PBS program This Old House. It was listed on the National Register of Historic Places in 1976.

== Description and history ==
The Bigelow House is located high on Oak Hill, from which the Newton neighborhood takes its name. It is a large 2 1/2-story wood-frame structure, with a rambling structure organized roughly around a central courtyard. It is in the Shingle style, with a combination of roof types. A small turret with conical roof projects from the building's southwest corner. The main section of the house is on the east side of the courtyard, with the southern wing primarily servants' quarters and facilities, and the carriage house to the north.

It was designed by Henry Hobson Richardson, and was one of the famous architect's last residential commissions before his death in 1886. The house was built for Dr. Henry Jacob Bigelow, a prominent Boston surgeon best known for his role in organizing the 1846 demonstration of ether as an anesthetic, but also important for developing surgical techniques for correcting dislocated hips.

His house was during the 20th century converted into a dormitory space for the New England Peabody Home for Crippled Children, whose main facility was built adjacent to the house. By the 1970s the property was owned by the city of Newton and in deteriorating condition. It was restored and divided into five condominium units in 1981-1982 by the PBS television series This Old House. Some of the original features, including a circular tower, have been preserved. It is listed on the National Register of Historic Places at 742 Dedham Street.

To see this rehabbed structure in online maps, use any of these addresses: 72, 74, 76, 78, or 80 on Ober Road in Newton, Massachusetts. Each condominium has its own address. The property on Dedham Street is a different development.

== See also ==
- Henry Bigelow House, Newton, Massachusetts, honoring a different individual
- National Register of Historic Places listings in Newton, Massachusetts
