= Henry Bigelow House =

Historic house in Massachusetts, United States

- U.S. National Register of Historic Places
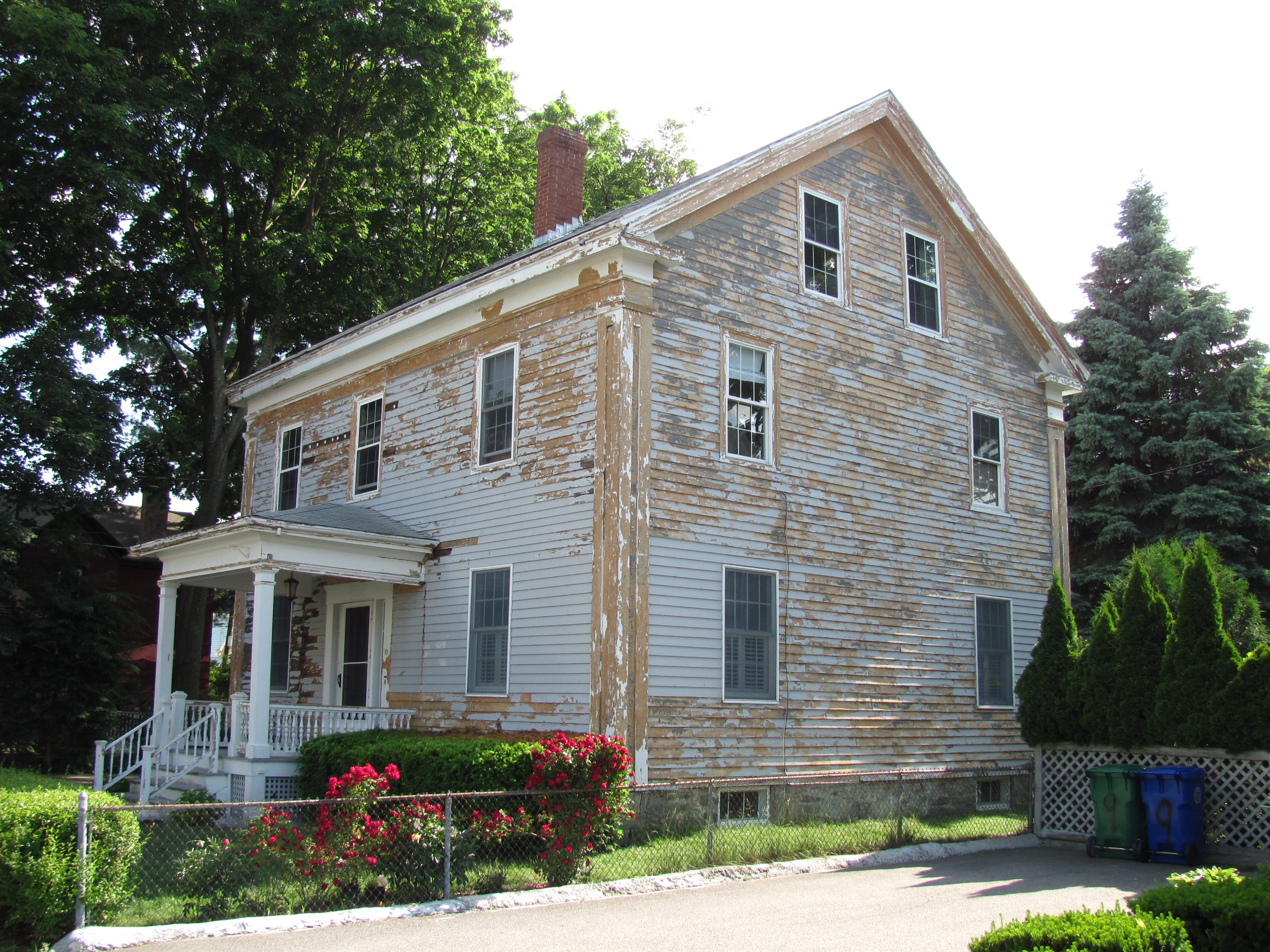
- Henry Bigelow House

- Location within Massachusetts Location within the United States
- Location: 15 Bigelow Terr., Newton Corner, Newton, Massachusetts
- Coordinates: 42°21′33″N 71°11′14″W
- Area: less than one acre
- Built: 1830
- Architectural style: Greek Revival
- MPS: Newton MRA
- NRHP reference No.: 86001774
- Added to NRHP: September 4, 1986

The Henry Bigelow House is a historic house in the Newton Corner village of Newton, Massachusetts. Built about 1830, it is a good local example of Greek Revival architecture, important as home to Henry Bigelow, a prominent local educator and philanthropist. On September 4, 1986, it was added to the National Register of Historic Places.

== Description and history ==
The Henry Bigelow House is located in a residential area north of the central commercial area of Newton Corner. It is located on the west side of Bigelow Terrace, a dead-end spur extending southward from Boyd Street in neighboring Watertown. The mailing address of this property is in Watertown. The house is a 2 1/2-story wood-frame structure, three bays wide, with a side-gable roof and clapboard siding. Its Greek Revival features include corner pilasters and an entablature below the eave. The center entrance is sheltered by a single-story hip-roofed porch, with square posts supporting an entablature and hip roof with balustrade.

This house appears to have been built in the 1840s, and was first located on Washington Street, where it is described as being owned by the Pool family. By 1850, it is owned by the family of Henry F. Bigelow. Bigelow is locally prominent as a leading member of the school board, and as a driving force behind the creation of the Newton Free Library and Newton Cemetery. At the time of his tenure, Newton's schools were recognized as among the nation's most progressive. Bigelow Terrace and the Bigelow Middle School are named in his honor. The house was moved from Washington Street to this location in 1895, occasioned by the widening of the railroad right-of-way next to that road.

== See also ==
- Dr. Henry Jacob Bigelow House, Newton, Massachusetts
- National Register of Historic Places listings in Newton, Massachusetts
