= Henry Jacob Bigelow =

American physician (1818–1890)

Henry Jacob Bigelow FAAAS
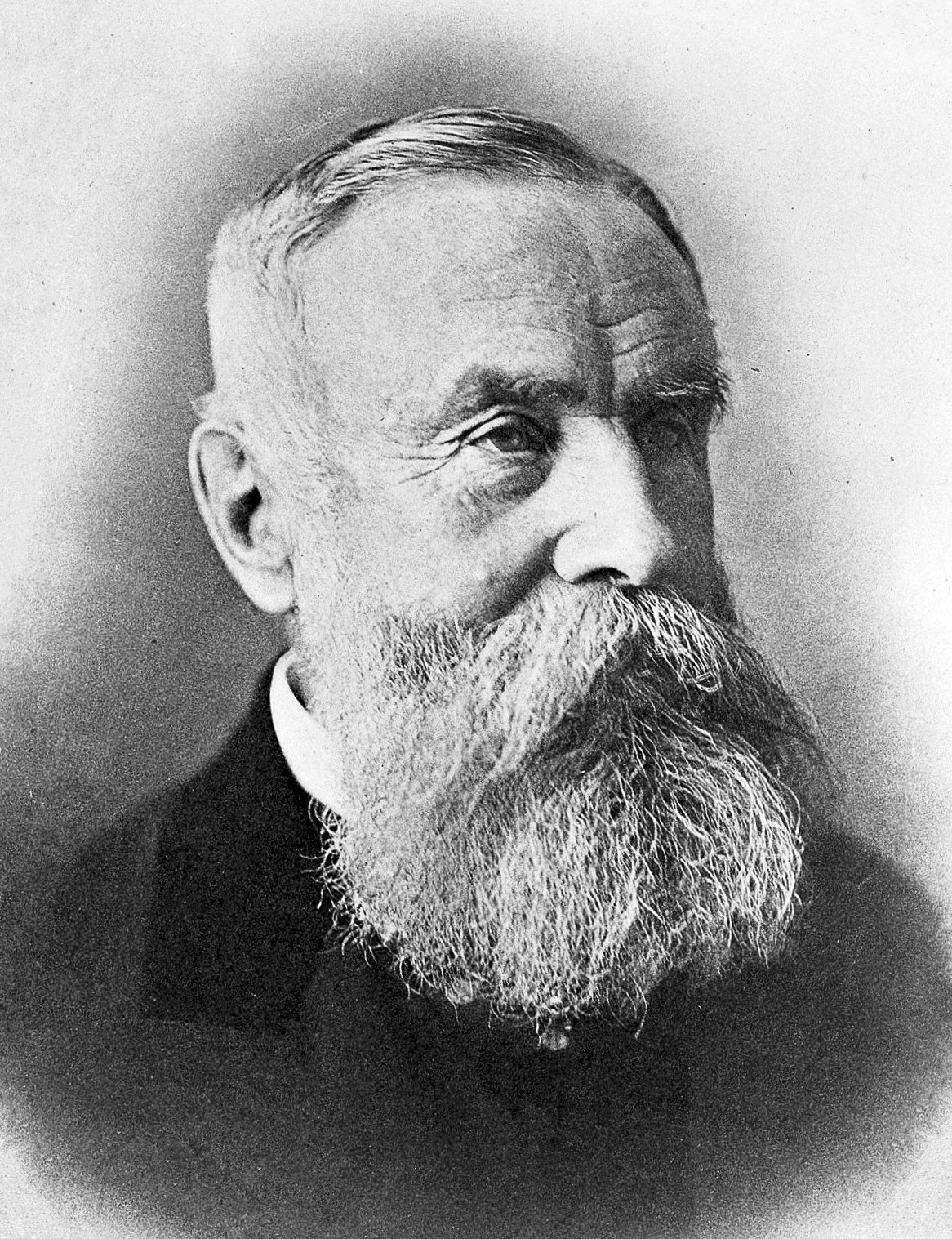
- Born: March 11, 1818; Boston, Massachusetts, U.S.
- Died: October 30, 1890 (aged 72); Newton, Massachusetts, U.S.
- Burial place: Mount Auburn Cemetery
- Education: Harvard College, A.B. (1837); Harvard University, M.D. (1841)
- Occupations: Professor, surgeon
- Known for: Ligament of Bigelow
- Children: William Sturgis Bigelow
- Father: Jacob Bigelow

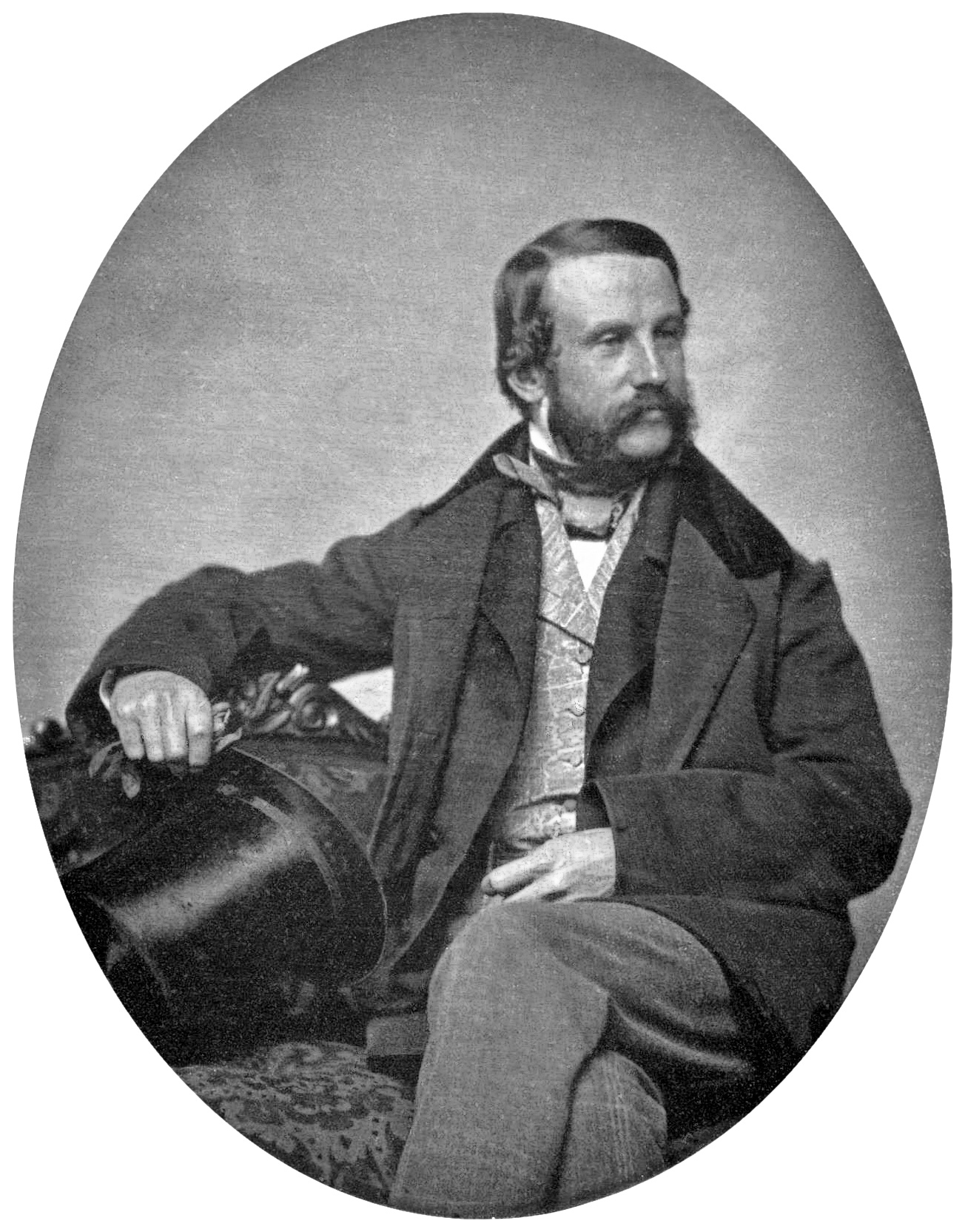
Bigelow c. 1854

Henry Jacob Bigelow (March 11, 1818 – October 30, 1890) was an American surgeon and Professor of Surgery at Harvard University. A dominating figure in Boston medicine for many decades, he is remembered for the Bigelow maneuver for hip dislocation, a technique for treatment of kidney stones, and other innovations. He was instrumental in bringing the anesthetic possibilities of ether to the attention of the medical field, and bringing the case of Phineas Gage to popular awareness. He was a vocal opponent of vivisection, and played a minor role in the apprehension of the culprit in the Parkman–Webster murder case.

== Biography ==
Bigelow was born March 11, 1818, in Boston to his mother, Mary Scollay, and his father, Jacob Bigelow who taught medicine at Harvard. Bigelow entered Harvard College at fifteen years old and, and graduated in 1837. He studied medicine both at Harvard University and at Dartmouth College (at the latter, under Oliver Wendell Holmes Sr.), receiving his M.D. at Harvard in 1841. He was elected a Fellow of the American Academy of Arts and Sciences in 1846.

His "Insensibility during Surgical Operations Produced by Inhalation" (1846), detailing the discovery of ether anesthesia, was selected by readers of the New England Journal of Medicine as the "most important article in NEJM history" in commemoration of the journal's 200th anniversary. "Dr. Harlow's case of Recovery from the passage of an Iron Bar through the Head" (1850) brought the case of Phineas Gage out of complete obscurity into merely relative obscurity, and largely neutralized remaining skepticism about the case.

Bigelow described the structure and function of the Y-ligament of the hip joint in great detail, and it still carries his name.

In 1878 he published "Lithotrity by a Single Operation", in which he described his a technique for "the crushing and removal of a stone from the bladder at one sitting." Prior to this, surgeons would crush a bladder stone and then spend only a few minutes removing the pieces. The remaining fragments would remain for a later session for removal. This resulted in much discomfort and complications as the remaining fragments found an exit on their own. Removing the entire bladder stone in one procedure was a great advancement.

Bigelow died October 30, 1890, after an accident, at his country home in Newton, Massachusetts. He is buried at Mount Auburn Cemetery. He was survived by one son, William Sturgis Bigelow.

== See also ==
- Dr. Henry Jacob Bigelow House
- Frank Lahey MD, founder of Lahey Clinic

== Bibliography ==
- Harrington, Thomas Francis (1905). Mumford, James Gregory (ed.). The Harvard Medical School: A History, Narrative and Documentary. 1782–1905. Lewis Publishing Company. pp. 835, 853, 858.
- Bigelow, Henry (November 18, 1846). "Insensibility during Surgical Operations Produced by Inhalation". Boston Med Surg J. 35 (16): 309–317. doi:10.1056/NEJM184611180351601. PMC 7897152.
