= Samuel D. Parker (attorney) =

American lawyer

District Attorney of Suffolk County, Massachusetts
- In office 1832–1852
- Preceded by: James T. Austin
- Succeeded by: John C. Park

Personal details
- Born: December 6, 1781 Boston
- Died: July 29, 1873 (aged 91) Boston
- Spouse: Elizabeth Mason
- Education: Harvard College

Samuel Dunn Parker (December 6, 1781 – July 29, 1873) was an American attorney who served as District Attorney of Suffolk County, Massachusetts.

== Early life ==
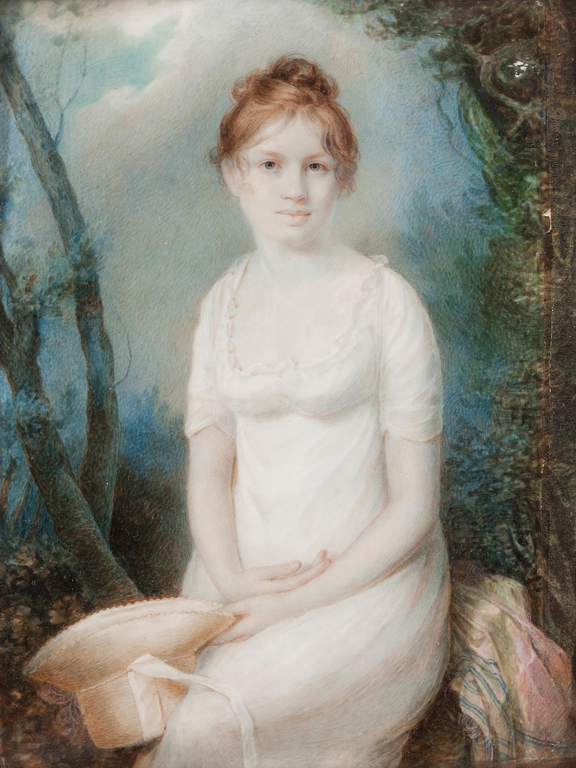
Eliza Mason Parker, portrait by Edward Greene Malbone

Parker was born on December 6, 1781, to Samuel Parker and Ann Cutler. He was one of 13 children. His brothers included acting Mayor of Boston William Parker, businessman John Rowe Parker, and educator Richard Green Parker. He graduated from Harvard College with an A.B. degree in 1799 and after college, spent many years as an instructor at Philips Exeter Academy.

On December 12, 1807, he married Elizabeth Mason, daughter of Jonathan Mason. They had seven children:

- Susan Elizabeth (Parker) Hoppin, wife of Rev. Nicholas Hoppin
- Susanna Powell (Parker) Grennough, wife of Alfred Greenough
- Anne Cutler (Parker) Hinckley, wife of Samuel L. Hinckley and mother of painters Susan Hinckley Bradley and Robert Cutler Hinckley
- Charles Henry Parker, Boston Common Councilor and treasurer of Suffolk Savings Bank. Father of Samuel D. Parker
- Jonathan Mason Parker, died young
- Jonathan Mason Parker, attorney in Chicago
- Isabella Parker Codman, wife of John Codman

== Legal career ==
Parker began his law studies in the office of Rufus G. Emory. After being admitted to the bar in 1823, Parker became a successful criminal defense attorney. On July 5, 1832, Parker was appointed District Attorney for Suffolk County by Governor Levi Lincoln Jr.

During his tenure as DA, Parker tried Abner Kneeland multiple times for blasphemy. Kneeland's 1838 conviction was the last time a court in the United States jailed a defendant for blasphemy. In 1842, Parker was the prosecutor in Commonwealth v. Hunt, a case which ruled that labor unions were legal. In 1844 he tried Abner Rogers Jr. for the murder of Charles Lincoln. Rogers was acquitted by reason of insanity.

In 1846 he prosecuted Albert Tirrell for the murder of Maria Bickford, a prostitute he left his wife to be with. Tirrell's attorney Rufus Choate presented the defense that Tirrell could have murdered Bickford while sleepwalking. Tirrell was found not guilty. It was the first time a sleepwalking defense was successful in a murder case.

In 1849, Parker tried Washington Goode, an African-American sailor, for the murder of Thomas Harding. Parker's case was largely circumstantial, but Goode was found guilty and hanged on May 25, 1849.

On November 30, 1849, a group of men, including City Marshal Francis Tukey, Henry Jacob Bigelow, Parkman Blake, Robert G. Shaw, and members of the Boston Police Department came to Parker's home to inform him that human remains had been found. Parker advised them to make a complaint and gave them directions on what to do with the body. The body was determined to be that of George Parkman and Harvard Medical School professor John White Webster was arrested for his murder. Parker testified as a government witness during the Parkman–Webster murder case.

In 1852, Parker was removed from office for political reasons. He was succeeded by John C. Park.

Parker died on July 29, 1873, at his home in Boston.
