= Walking Cinema: Murder on Beacon Hill =

Mixed-reality storytelling iPhone application

- Developer: Untravel Media
- Release: 2009
- Operating system: iOS (iPhone)
- Platform: iPhone, iPod Touch
- Type: Location-based mixed-reality storytelling / walking tour
- Website: parkmanmurder.com (defunct)

Walking Cinema: Murder on Beacon Hill is an iPhone application released around 2010 designed by Untravel Media, based on the Parkman–Webster murder case, where John White Webster was accused of the murder of George Parkman. The case was the first one to use the budding science of forensics. The iPhone application was recognized to be the first iPhone application to be accepted to a major film festival, based on the PBS documentary, Murder at Harvard. The application is a mixed-reality storytelling experience, combining a roughly one-mile walk with audio, video, a live map and location-based adventures to guide participants through the story.

== Cast and crew ==
| Name | Role |
|---|---|
| Michael Epstein | Writer, director |
| Eric Stange | Writer, Collaborating Director |
| Caitlin Mailly | Producer |
| Laura Pirano | Producer, cinematographer, editor, art director, Digital Effects, Animator |
| Sasha Mandel | Original Music, Sound Editor |
| Michael Born | Map Animation and Renderings |
| Raizlabs | Application Design and Software Development |
| Susi Walsh | Project Coordinator |
| Brooke Scibelli | Production Assistant |
| Alexandra McDougall | Narrator |
| Paul Logan, Jr. | Additional Voices |
| S. Parkman “Parkie” Shaw | Descendant of George Parkman |
| Ronald Story | Historian |
| Karen Halttunen | Historian |

== Stops on the tour ==
- The Etherdome at Massachusetts General Hospital
- The Liberty Hotel
- Black Ink
- Blackstone's
- Harvard Musical Association
- Acorn Street
- Parkman's House, 8 Walnut St.
- Appalachian Mountain Club, 5 Joy St.

== Awards ==
- "Indie Spec New Media", 2010 Boston International Film Festival
