= Boston Jail =

The Boston Jail may refer to:

In Boston, Massachusetts:

- Boston Gaol (Massachusetts), off Court St. (1635-1822)
- Leverett Street Jail (1822-1851)
- Charles Street Jail (built 1851)
