= Napoleon of crime =

Nickname applied to various criminals

Napoleon of crime is a nickname that has been applied to various real and fictional criminals.

Even before his death, the name of French leader Napoleon had already become an eponym and metaphor for someone achieving outstanding success, often through ruthless ambition, in various fields of endeavour. Gabriel-Julien Ouvrard was "the Napoleon of finance"; later Ferdinand Ward was the "Young Napoleon of Finance"; in 1913 The Economist called J. Pierpont Morgan "the Napoleon of Wall Street". Commercial traveller George Moore was "the Napoleon of the Road".

A newspaper report on the 1850 George Parkman murder case contrasted the alternative suspects: "If Webster did it, it was like all such affairs since Cain's, bungling and weak. If Littlefield did it, his arrangements made him the Napoleon of crime." In an 1898 short story, Francis Pollock describes a daring jewel thief as 'what the newspapers call "a Napoleon of crime"'.

Notable instances of people being called a (or the) "Napoleon of crime" include:

- Charles Peace (1832–1879), in newspaper articles in 1879 (quoting "a farmer named Townry" from near Chesterfield, Derbyshire) and 1893 (written by "an official who knew him")
- Professor Moriarty, said by Sherlock Holmes in "The Final Problem" (1893) by Arthur Conan Doyle.
- Adam Worth (alias "Harry Raymond", c. 1844–1902) based on a remark ("the Napoleon of the criminal world") by Robert Anderson when Assistant Commissioner (Crime) (between 1888 and 1901) of the UK Metropolitan Police. In his 1907 memoir, Anderson said "[Worth] was the most eminent of the criminal fraternity of my time ... His schemes were Napoleonic." A discussion of the book in Blackwood's Magazine said, "Sir Robert Anderson properly calls [Worth] a Napoleon of crime".
- Macavity, the antagonist of Old Possum's Book of Practical Cats (1939) by T. S. Eliot.
