= Washington Goode =

American murderer

Washington Goode (c. 1820 – May 25, 1849) was an African-American sailor who was hanged for murder in Boston in May 1849. His case was the subject of considerable attention by those opposed to the death penalty, resulting in over 24,000 signatures on petitions for clemency to Massachusetts governor George N. Briggs.

His trial was presided over by Justice Lemuel Shaw who the following year would sentence Professor John White Webster to death for the murder of Harvard Medical School benefactor, George Parkman, another trial that would capture Boston's imagination and blur the lines of distinction between opponents and advocates of capital punishment. Goode's trial was reported widely in the newspapers, including The Tioga Eagle of June 13, 1849, published in Wellsboro, Pennsylvania, which carried a brief notice of his hanging:

Washington Goode, a colored man, was hung at Boston on Friday, for the murder of Thomas Harding. He made a desperate attempt the night previous to commit suicide by cutting the veins of his arm with glass, and swallowing tobacco and tarred rope. Goode was only 20 [sic] years of age, and was with General Taylor through all the Florida War. He protested his innocence to the last.

== Life ==
Washington Goode was born in 1820 in Mercersburg, Pennsylvania. He lived for a time in Chambersburg, Pennsylvania. Goode reportedly fought for General Zachary Taylor who would eventually become the twelfth president of the United States in the Florida war. There is some discrepancy to the date and place of Goode's birth. While Goode claimed to have been born in Pennsylvania, his uncle George Myres claimed that Goode was born in Baltimore, Maryland and was 28 years of age in 1849 which would have made his birth year 1821.

His uncle also claimed that 15-year-old Washington accompanied him to Boston in 1836 and after settling among the city's small black population, began working as a servant on board ships that sailed from Boston. Myers rarely saw his nephew while he was in port in Boston as Goode preferred to hang out in the North End section of Boston known as the "Black Sea."

By 1848, Goode was a seaman who had reportedly served as second cook on board the steamer William J. Pease and also as a cook aboard the barque Nancoockee. While in port in Boston, it was known that Goode was friends with Mary Ann Williams, whom he considered to be his girlfriend although she was married. At the same time, another black seaman, Thomas Harding was friends with Williams and also considered her to be his girlfriend. On the night of Wednesday, June 28, 1848, an argument broke out between Thomas Harding and Washington Goode regarding a handkerchief that Harding had given to Williams. Sometime thereafter, Thomas Harding was dead of a blow to the head and a knife wound between the ribs. Goode was promptly arrested for the murder of his fellow seaman.

== Trial ==
Goode's trial began on January 1, 1849. As it was a capital case, it was tried before the Supreme Judicial Court presided over by Chief Justice Lemuel Shaw, one of the most influential jurists in nineteenth-century America. The evidence used by District Attorney Samuel D. Parker to build his case against Goode was largely circumstantial. Although no one saw Goode crack Harding's skull or stab him between the ribs, several witnesses at the trial testified that they saw a person fitting Goode's description in the area of the crime. Also, when he was arrested Goode had in his possession a knife whose blade measured ten or eleven inches. Harding's stab wound was measured at nine inches deep.

Goode was defended by two young distinguished attorneys, William Aspinwall (who had not previously defended a capital case), while Edward Fuller Hodges (his name is erroneously given as E.F. or Edgar F.) assisted Aspinwall. The two attorneys argued that their client was innocent, denouncing the testimony of the prosecution's witnesses and casting doubt on the circumstantial evidence presented by Samuel Parker. In his closing argument, Hodges began to discuss the inappropriateness of capital punishment in Massachusetts when Parker objected and was told by Chief Justice Shaw that he was out of order to discuss the appropriateness of justice of the death penalty. The jury deliberated for only thirty-five minutes before finding Goode guilty of murder and on January 15, 1849 he was sentenced to death by Chief Justice Shaw. He was to be hanged on May 25, 1849.

== Debate over capital punishment and petitions for clemency ==
Goode's case came about in the midst of a national debate over capital punishment and served as a rallying point for Boston's opponents of the death penalty who hoped to save Goode from the gallows. By most accounts, the community's opposition to the death penalty was solid and widespread. Meetings were held in several Massachusetts cities and towns in support of Washington Goode with a committee being appointed by the Massachusetts Society for the Abolition of Capital Punishment to advocate on his behalf.

Those volunteering to serve on the committee included his attorneys Aspinwall and Hodges, as well as Wendell Phillips, Walter Channing, Samuel May, Robert Rantoul, Jr., James Freeman Clarke and Frederick Douglass, among other politicians, ministers and reformers. One such meeting was chaired by Amasa Walker and took place on Good Friday, April 6, 1849 at the Tremont Temple. Attendees of the meeting were addressed by several prominent figures of the time including Reverend William H. Channing, Wendell Phillips and Reverend James Freeman Clarke. Each speaker implored attendees of the meeting to sign a petition to have Goode's death sentence commuted on the grounds that society, by its neglect, prejudice, and injustice, had in fact made Goode into a murderer and was now using him as an example.

While others who had been given the same sentence had already been pardoned, Goode's sentence was still scheduled to be carried out even though the evidence presented against him was not clear and conclusive. Committee meetings were held in all the principal towns throughout the state to collect signatures from those who opposed Goode's impending execution. More than twenty four thousand signatures were obtained. In all, 130 petitions from Massachusetts communities were compiled.

A document entitled "Protest of 400 inhabitants of Concord against the execution of Washington Goode" is preserved at the Institute at Walden Woods as a document of vital historical interest in the history of human rights. In the effort to save Washington Goode from execution, 400 citizens of Concord, Massachusetts, including Henry David Thoreau, two of his sisters, Sophia Thoreau and Helen D. Thoreau, and his mother, Cynthia D. Thoreau, as well as Ralph Waldo Emerson, signed the petition now known as the "Protest of 400...against the execution of Washington Goode."

William Lloyd Garrison, editor of The Liberator, became involved in the debate over the commutation of Goode's death sentence. In The Liberator Garrison argued that the verdict relied on "circumstantial evidence of the most flimsy character..." and feared that the determination of the government to uphold its decision to execute Goode was based on race. As all other death sentences since 1836 in Boston had been commuted, Garrison concluded that Goode would be the last person executed in Boston for a capital offense writing, "Let it not be said that the last man Massachusetts bore to hang was a colored man!" Parker Pillsbury also used the pages of a prominent newspaper, the Semi-Weekly Republican as well as The Liberator to plead for commutation of Goode's sentence. The activists involved in the protest relied heavily on the question of race to play a large role in saving Goode from the gallows. Through his case, reformers not only sought to express their opposition to the death penalty but also to racism.

Despite the powerful and numerous appeals to spare Goode's life including an application by his counsel to commute his sentence, Governor George N. Briggs adamantly refused to commute Goode's death sentence. Goode's execution marked a turning point in the early 19th-century campaign to abolish the death penalty in Massachusetts. As no person had been hanged in Boston since 1836, those opposed to the death penalty thought this showed a shift in the public's attitude away from capital punishment. However, Goode was to be hanged as scheduled on May 25.

== Hanging ==
In the days before the scheduled hanging, Goode repeatedly professed his innocence to the clergymen who entered his prison cell. On the night before the hanging, Goode attempted suicide by swallowing large pieces of tobacco and paper and slashing the veins in his arms with a piece of glass. When the prison guards entered his cell, he had already lost a considerable amount of blood. However, the prison doctor stopped the bleeding thus saving his life so that he could be put to death the next day. Exhausted and weakened by the loss of blood, Goode was carried to the gallows at 9:30am on May 25, by prison guards who had strapped him to a chair. A large crowd had gathered in the rain to watch the event that took place inside the walls of the Leverett Street Jail.

At 9:45am Goode was placed still strapped to the chair on the platform over the drop, the sheriff placed a white hood over his head and the rope was adjusted around his neck. The sheriff then read the warrant signed by the Governor after which the trap door sprang open and Goode plunged several feet. Twenty-five minutes later, doctors examined the body and pronounced him dead. His body was then turned over to his uncle George Myres who took his body back to his house to prepare for the funeral. Perhaps as a testament to their continued opposition to the death penalty, over one thousand people paraded through the tenement where Goode's body laid, escorting it to the South Burying Ground where it was laid to rest in one of the city's tombs.
