= Pliny Merrick =

American judge

Associate Justice of the Massachusetts Supreme Judicial Court
- In office 1853–1864
- Appointed by: John H. Clifford
- Preceded by: Caleb Cushing
- Succeeded by: Theron Metcalf

District attorney of Worcester County, Massachusetts
- In office 1824–1844
- Preceded by: Edward D. Bangs
- Succeeded by: Ezra W. Wilkinson

Personal details
- Born: August 2, 1794 Brookfield, Massachusetts, U.S.
- Died: January 31, 1867 (aged 72) Boston, Massachusetts, U.S.
- Party: Anti-Masonic Party; Whig Party
- Spouse: Rebecca Thomas Merrick
- Parent(s): Pliny Merrick; Ruth (Cutler) Merrick
- Education: Harvard Law School
- Profession: Attorney; Politician

Pliny T. Merrick (August 2, 1794 – January 31, 1867) was an American attorney and politician from Massachusetts. He served as an associate justice of the Massachusetts Supreme Judicial Court.

== Early life ==
Merrick was born in Brookfield, Massachusetts, the son of Honorable Pliny Merrick and Ruth (Cutler) Merrick. He graduated from Harvard Law School in 1814, and was admitted to the Worcester bar in 1817. He began the practice of law in Worcester, before moving to Charlton, Swansea and Taunton to practice law. In June, 1824, he returned to Worcester and served as Worcester County's district attorney from 1824 to 1843. In 1826, Merrick was elected a member of the American Antiquarian Society.

== Judicial career ==
In 1844 he was Judge of the Municipal Court, and in 1843 he was named a judge of the Massachusetts Courts of Common Pleas. He resigned this appointment in 1848, and was reappointed in 1851.

From 1849 to 1850, he was senior defense counsel (co-counsel with Edward Dexter Sohier) in the trial of Harvard University Professor John White Webster, accused of murdering Harvard patron Dr. George Parkman. The prosecutors for the trial were John H. Clifford, then Massachusetts Attorney-General and the prosecutor of all capital murder cases, and George Bemis, Esq, and independent attorney. In 1853, Merrick was promoted to the bench of the Supreme Judicial Court by the same John H. Clifford, now Governor of Massachusetts. Merrick received the degree of LL.D. from Harvard in 1853. He served on the bench of the Massachusetts Supreme Judicial Court until 1864.

He was a representative of Worcester County in both branches of the state legislature. He was an Overseer of Harvard University from 1852 to 1856. He also served for two years as president of the Worcester and Nashua Railroad. In 1855 Merrick moved to Boston and lived there until his death in 1867.

== John White Webster Trial ==
From 1849 to 1850 Merrick was senior defense counsel in the Parkman-Webster murder case. The gruesome murder drew national attention and although Merrick lost the case, he received much notoriety for the case.

The Boston Globe reported Merrick's response, that upon the verdict, "In a moment or two, his senior counsel, Judge Merrick, to the dock, and addressed a few words to the prisoner, to which, so far as we could judge, he replied.— Judge Merrick was deeply affected, and so agitated that he could hardly stand."

== Anti-Masonic Movement ==
Merrick was an active promoter of the Anti-Masonic Party. The party developed in the early nineteenth century, opposing political leaders who were members of secretive Masonic brotherhoods. Masonic members held political views on the role of the government and how the country should expand. The Anti-Masonic Party opposed those views as moving away from the original founding fathers intent. Merrick renounced Free Masonry in 1832. The party was the precursor to the Whig Party.

== Death ==
Merrick died of paralysis in Boston on January 31, 1867, in his 73rd year. His obituary in the New York Times (2/4/1867) stated: "In 1864 an attack of paralysis obliged him to resign his seat on the Bench. His mind, however, had remained unclouded until a second and fatal attack..." He bequeathed a fund for the establishment of schools of high grade in Worcester.

== Family life ==
On May 23, 1827, Merrick married Rebecca Thomas, daughter of Isaiah Thomas Jr. of Worcester; she died June 17, 1859. They had no children.

His niece Alice Miller Rice married U.S. Congressman William W. Rice.

Legal offices
Preceded by Caleb Cushing	Associate Justice of the Massachusetts Supreme Judicial Court; 1853-1864	Succeeded by Horace Gray
