= Parkman–Webster murder case =

1849 murder case

After Boston businessman George Parkman disappeared in November 1849, his dismembered and partially burned body was found in the laboratory of John Webster, a lecturer at Harvard Medical College; Webster was convicted of Parkman's murder and hanged. Highly publicized because of its gruesome nature and the high social status of Parkman and Webster, the case was one of the earliest in which forensic evidence was used to identify a body.

== Main participants ==
=== George Parkman ===
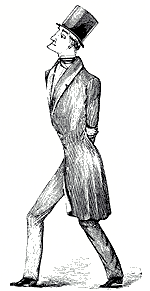
George Parkman, "The Pedestrian".

George Parkman (February 19, 1790 – November 23, 1849), a Boston Brahmin, belonged to one of the city's richest families. He was a well-known figure in the streets of Boston, which he walked daily, collecting his rents (a thrifty man, he did not own a horse). He was tall and lean, with a protruding chin, and wore a top hat. Oliver Wendell Holmes Sr. said that "he abstained while others indulged, he walked while others rode, he worked while others slept." Fanny Longfellow, wife of the poet Henry Wadsworth Longfellow, called him "the lean doctor ... the good-natured Don-Quixote." He was worth some half a million dollars in 1849 (equivalent to $371 million in wealth in 2023).

=== John White Webster ===
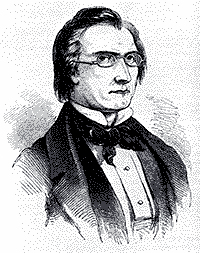
Webster during his trial.

John White Webster (May 20, 1793 – August 30, 1850) was a lecturer at the new Harvard Medical College. He was described by Holmes as "pleasant in the lecture room, rather nervous and excitable." Many of Webster's classroom demonstrations involved some of the latest chemical discoveries. George F. Hoar mentioned that Webster's lectures were "tedious", at least for a non-chemistry major, but that he "was known to the students by the sobriquet of 'Sky-rocket Jack,' owing to his great interest in having some fireworks at the illumination when President Everett, his former classmate, was inaugurated. There was no person less likely to commit such a bloody and cruel crime as that for which he was accused." Many anecdotes suggest his classroom demonstrations were livened by pyrotechnic drama, and on one occasion the President of Harvard warned that some of them were dangerous if an accident occurred.

Webster had financial problems. His family had been forced to give up a mansion he had built in Cambridge, although they were leasing a respectable but not grand house in 1849. He was in debt to a number of friends, as his salary and meager lecture earnings could not cover his expenses. Noted mineralogist and Harvard Professor Clifford Frondel appraised the books Webster authored on chemistry as "creditable" and had praise for them.

=== Ephraim Littlefield ===
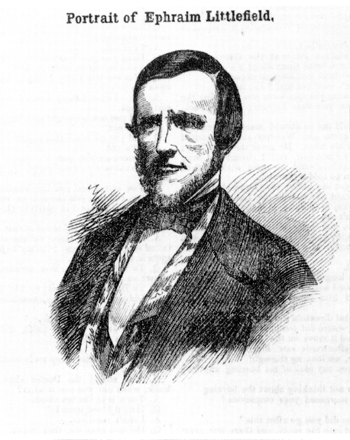
Ephraim Littlefield.

A Swamp Yankee of rural origins, Ephraim Littlefield was the janitor at Harvard Medical College, built in 1846, and had also been the janitor at the previous one since 1842. He and his wife Caroline lived in the basement of the college, adjacent to Webster's laboratory. He knew Webster and the other Harvard doctors well, and observed their study of medicine, including the dissection of cadavers for the study of human anatomy. As janitor, he cleaned the doctors' rooms and laboratories, started their fires, generally set up the specimens for their lectures, and did whatever else they asked. After Webster's trial, he collected a $3,000 reward for providing information about Parkman's disappearance (equivalent to $113,388 in 2024) and was able to retire comfortably.

== Crime and investigation ==
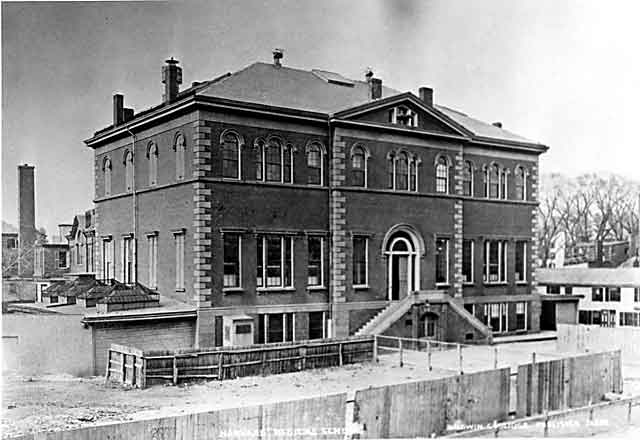
Harvard Medical School in the 19th century.

On November 22, 1849, a week before Thanksgiving, Parkman went to Cambridge to look for Webster and asked Mr. Pettee, the Harvard cashier, to give him the money from the sale of Webster's lecture tickets to repay Webster's debt. On November 23, Parkman was out collecting debts as usual. That day, Webster visited Parkman's home, suggesting that they meet at the Medical College that afternoon at 1:30 pm. At 1:45 pm, the last confirmed sighting of Parkman had him entering the college on North Grove Street, wearing a dark frock coat, dark trousers, a purple satin vest, and a stovepipe hat. Later that afternoon, Littlefield found Webster's rooms locked from the inside, and heard water running. Webster was home by 6:00 pm and attended a party at the house of friends, the Treadwells, showing no outward signs of distress.

On November 24, the Parkman family made anxious inquiries and contacted the police. Also that day, Littlefield saw Webster with a bundle; Webster told him to make a fire. On November 25, Webster appeared outside the college where he met Parkman's nephew James Henry Blake and police officer Trenholm. They asked him if he had seen Parkman. That afternoon, he also visited Parkman's brother, the Reverend Francis Parkman, and informed him and his family that he had met the missing man after obtaining $483.64 to pay a debt installment, and that the latter promised that he would go right away to have the payment recorded by the city clerk to clear the debt. Webster then left without inquiring about the search.

On November 26, with a $3,000 reward settled on for finding Parkman alive, the family had 28,000 copies of a wanted notice printed up, posted, and distributed; a little later, $1,000 was offered for his body. On November 27, Webster worked at the college in the evening. The city was abuzz with speculation fueled by its 120 periodicals. At first, Irish immigrants were blamed. Some believed Parkman had simply left the city; others thought he had been beaten up for the money he always carried with him. Unsigned letters mailed from Boston proposed various scenarios. City Marshal Francis Tukey had the Charles River and Boston Harbor dragged for a body, and sent men to neighboring towns to check. Search parties were formed that went out day and night. The police searched Parkman's buildings, both rented and vacant, and even abandoned buildings that he did not own. Derastus Clapp and other police officers from Tukey's newly formed professional police force made their first search of his rooms. They returned once, each time placing special emphasis on the laboratories and dissecting vaults, but they found nothing to indicate that Parkman had been there.

Littlefield became nervous, as some began to link him to the disappearance, and suspicious, as Webster was behaving oddly. A few days after the murder, the two men met in the street, and Webster asked the janitor if he had seen Parkman at the college the previous week. When Littlefield said he had, on Friday around 1:30, Webster struck his cane on the ground, then asking him if he had seen Parkman anywhere in the building, had seen him after 1:30, or if Parkman had been in Webster's own lecture room. When Littlefield answered no to these questions, Webster repeated the story about paying off the debt and walked off, having said more to Littlefield than in their entire years together at the college. Littlefield remembered that four days prior to the murder, Webster had asked him a number of questions about the dissecting vault, and after the college had been searched, the professor had surprised him with a turkey for his Thanksgiving dinner – the first gift he had ever given him.

On November 28, Webster was at the college early; Littlefield watched him from under the door, seeing as far as his knees. Webster moved from the furnace to the fuel closet and back, making eight separate trips. Later in the day, his furnace was burning so hard that the wall on the other side was hot to the touch. When Webster was gone, Littlefield let himself into the room through a window, all the doors being bolted. He found that the kindling barrels were nearly empty, though they had recently been filled, and there were wet spots that tasted like acid in odd places. On November 29 (Thanksgiving), Littlefield borrowed a hatchet, drill, crowbar and mortar chisel, and with his wife standing guard, began chiseling away the wall under Webster's private lab privy. He went down a tunnel into the vault where the wall had felt hot and began to hack at it where the privy emptied into a pit that the police had not searched. He went through two layers of brick in just over an hour, and then stopped to go to a dance, leaving the remaining layers for the next day.

On November 30, Littlefield resumed chiseling and worked for some time until he managed to punch a hole into the wall, at which point he felt a strong draft that did not permit his lantern to stay lit inside. Maneuvering it, he looked around, ignoring the foul fumes and letting his eyes adjust to the dark. Finally, he saw something out of the ordinary. He narrowed his eyes and looked more sharply until he just made out on top of a dirt mound the shape of a human pelvis. He also saw a dismembered thigh and the lower part of a leg.

Littlefield exited his excavation and ran to the home of another professor, Jacob Bigelow, who then found Marshal Tukey. By the time Tukey arrived, word had spread, and a whole party of men was waiting for the official report on the bones' identity. Tukey first had Littlefield go through the dissection room and inventory the specimens to make sure that none was missing. Then several men went into the tunnel and moved toward the vault. They decided that the man with the longest arms would go into the privy and hand out the remains. He handed out the pelvis, the right thigh, and the lower left leg, and these were placed on a board to await the arrival of the coroner, Jabez Pratt.

After this, Marshal Tukey dispatched Officer Clapp and two other constables to take Webster from his home in Cambridge. Without initially telling him he was under arrest, they took him to jail on a charge of murder. Webster initially denied knowledge of the crime. When told what Littlefield had found, he exclaimed, "That villain! I am a ruined man", going on to blame the janitor and mentioning that only the two of them had access to the privy. He then fell silent, sitting in his cell, trembling and sweating. He put what he later admitted to be strychnine into his mouth, but it only made him ill.

Meanwhile, investigators wondered where the rest of the body was. Littlefield observed that he had found a bone fragment in a furnace in the laboratory to which Webster had access and showed it to the marshal. A full search of the toilet area was then conducted, with Webster brought in from the jail to observe. While the officers and coroner were searching, Littlefield showed them a piece of the furnace that he had broken off, on which a piece of bone was fused. They insisted he put it back where he found it. Webster watched mutely as they laid out the parts they had already found, and then he was taken back to jail.

On December 1, a coroner's jury was assembled to make a judgment about the disposition of the case. Before they were let in, the coroner and marshal's men examined a sink that appeared to be recently gouged in several places, the strange acid stains on the floor and steps, and the contents of the furnace (from which they extracted a button, some coins, and more bone fragments, including a jaw bone with teeth). Then they dumped out a chest from which came a foul odor, and there was an armless, headless, hairy and partly burned torso. Just as they determined that the head had been sawn off, they found a saw nearby. Then they found a thigh stuffed inside the torso, and the heart and other organs missing. Mrs. Parkman identified the body as her husband's from markings near the penis and on the lower back. His brother-in-law said that he had seen the extreme hairiness of Parkman's body and confirmed that the body was his.

Subsequent searches turned up bloody clothing belonging to Webster, as well as the right kidney. Testing on the stains showed them to be copper nitrate, a substance effective for removing blood, and Jeffries Wyman arrived to identify the bone fragments. Since they were already at a medical college with good facilities for the examination of a body, they laid out the parts, tested them, and wrote up thorough descriptions. They conjectured that a hole found underneath the left breast might have been the stab that had killed the victim, although it did not resemble a wound and there was no blood. By the end of the day, they had estimated the man's height to have been 5'10", a match to George Parkman.

After Webster's arrest, the Boston Brahmins were reluctant to believe that one of their own could be guilty. Longfellow's wife wrote, "Boston is at this moment in sad suspense about the fate of poor Dr. Parkman. ... You will see by the papers what dark horror overshadows us like an eclipse. Of course, we cannot believe Dr. Webster guilty, bad as the evidence looks. ... Many suspect the janitor, who is known to be a bad man and to have wished for the reward offered for Dr. Parkman's body. He could make things appear against the doctor, having bodies under his control. I trust our minds will be soon relieved, but, meanwhile, they are soiled by new details continually. I went to see poor Mrs. Webster on Saturday, the day after her husband's arrest, but of course, was not admitted. What a terrible blight upon her life and that of the girls! The mere suspicion, for I cannot believe anything can be proved." On December 1, Harvard librarian John Langdon Sibley wrote in his journal: "The standing of Dr. Webster, his uniform tenor of conduct since the disappearance of Dr. Parkman, his artlessness & unfamiliarity with the crime of any kind have been such that the excitement, the melancholy, the aghastness of every body are indescribable. The professors poh! at the mere suspicion that he is guilty. ... People cannot eat; they feel sick."

== Trial ==
Chief Justice Shaw

On January 26, 1850, Webster was indicted for murder. Leading lawyers Daniel Webster and Rufus Choate both declined to serve as John Webster's counsel. While awaiting trial, Webster wrote out a detailed, 194-page defense.

The inquest jury, in an 84-page decision, decided that the body parts were indeed those of Parkman, that he had been killed and dismembered at the medical college, and that Webster was accountable for it. Using these findings, the grand jury returned a True Bill and indicted him. According to their report, they believed that Webster had assaulted Parkman with a knife, and also had beaten and struck him until he was dead.

From a list provided for him, Webster chose Harvard graduates Edward Dexter Sohier and Pliny T. Merrick as his attorneys. Sohier had handled Webster's civil (mostly financial) matters in the past. Inexperienced in criminal law, he provided a second-rate defense for Webster. Merrick, more experienced in criminal law, held a secondary position during the trial. Webster did not discuss strategy with them. Instead, he handed them his papers, which contained the same story he had been telling. Neither attorney addressed the claim in Webster's notes that Littlefield may have perjured himself, and neither cross-examined Littlefield about his corpse-stealing nor emphasized that the janitor lived near the lab, giving him an opportunity to plant the body parts and collect the reward.

The trial began on March 19, 1850, with Chief Justice Lemuel Shaw (Harvard class of 1800) of the Massachusetts Supreme Judicial Court presiding. Associate Justices Samuel Wilde, Charles A. Dewey, and Theron Metcalf were also present. The trial ran for twelve days: March 19–23, March 25–30, and April 1. Sixty thousand people witnessed at least part of the trial (with tickets handed out to the waiting crowds and spectators quickly rotated through); journalists came from as far as London, Paris, and Berlin. The courtroom was large and noisy; Webster sat in the prisoner's dock on the left, surrounded by an iron railing. The judge sat across from the dock, while the jury sat to his right. On the first day, Webster carried gloves, and he pleaded not guilty.

Within an hour, the jury of twelve was impanelled.

Leading the prosecution were Massachusetts Attorney General John Clifford (later Governor), who mainly confined his role to opening and closing statements, and George Bemis, Esq., a Harvard Law School graduate and the son of a prosperous manufacturer. Bemis, a legal scholar and respected, rigorous prosecutor, later wrote a Report of the trial that came to be received as the official version. The two men's styles complemented each other. On the first day, Clifford made a three-hour opening statement presenting facts and evidence; Bemis then began his examination of witnesses, who conceded that they would not have recognized the body as belonging to Parkman.

The next day, the jury visited the scene of the crime, even entering the privy pit. Back in the courtroom, the coroner described Webster as "mad" after his arrest (possibly due to the strychnine); his lawyers did not object. Woodbridge Strong then talked about what was needed to burn a corpse and the odor it would produce, after which anatomy professor Frederick S. Ainsworth pointed out that his department's dissection specimens differed from the body in question. Jeffries Wyman described which bones had been found. The defense argued that the body was not Parkman's, and questioned whether the wound on his body had killed him, as there was little blood near it.

On the third day, Oliver Wendell Holmes Sr., the dean of Harvard Medical College, who held a post endowed by Parkman, took the stand. He testified his belief that the body had been dismembered by someone with a knowledge of dissection and anatomy, that a wound between the ribs would not necessarily cause a large amount of blood loss, and that the corpse's build was "not dissimilar" to that of George Parkman. Wyman again described the bones and showed how they fit together. Then Nathan Cooley Keep, Parkman's dentist, swore that the jawbone with false teeth found in the furnace belonged to Parkman, recognizing it as the work he had done in the fall of 1846. He showed the jury how the discovered jawbone fit exactly into a plaster impression that he had made of Parkman's jaw. A fire alarm then rang from the building where Clifford had his belongings, so the court recessed while he went to retrieve them. When court resumed, Keep burst into tears as he showed how the loose teeth from the furnace fit into his plates. Composing himself, he showed through an inscription that the mold had been made specifically for Parkman.

On Friday and Saturday, Ephraim Littlefield took the stand. He told how Parkman had demanded payment on November 19, how Webster had asked if one could use a light inside the dissecting room vault (to which Littlefield said no), how Webster began locking his rooms, about the turkey and then about the heat on the walls that had led him to dig into the privy. The defense accused Littlefield of being after the reward, which he denied, though they did not accuse him of the murder, as Webster had indicated they should. Overall, the janitor made a good impression – confident, honest, and unflappable. His wife Caroline also testified.

After a Sunday recess, on Monday the court heard about Webster's debt problem, and doubt was cast on his claim that he had repaid Parkman. Webster's attorneys admitted that Webster could not account for the $483.64 he said he had paid Parkman. A police officer then told how he had found the torso in a tea chest, which was then displayed, complete with blood stains. He also said that it was possible to fit the other parts into the privy hole, but not the torso. More witnesses were brought forth to testify about Webster's unusual behavior after Parkman's disappearance, and three unsigned letters meant to throw the police off the track were shown. A man familiar with Webster's hand testified to his belief that Webster had written the letters. Before the prosecution rested, a witness then confirmed that Parkman was on the steps of the college early on Friday afternoon.

The defense then spent two days attempting to refute the prosecution's case. Sohier gave a long speech, among other things, complaining that Webster could not defend himself (at the time in Massachusetts, capital murder defendants could only make one unsworn speech to the jury right at the end of the trial). Sohier explained the difference between murder and manslaughter, which left the impression that he believed a homicide had occurred. He asserted that the prosecution had failed to show beyond a reasonable doubt that Webster was the killer, or even how Parkman had died. Sohier brought forth 23 character witnesses and seven others who claimed to have seen Parkman after his supposed time of disappearance. Following the judge's instructions, the jury ignored the testimony of those defense witnesses who swore they had seen the missing man after he was supposedly murdered. The state's rationale was that those sightings were instead of a Springfield man named George Bliss who the prosecution suggested, with no testimony from Bliss or anyone else, was in Boston on the day in question. In 2007–2008, researchers re-examining the case from Webster's perspective located an image of Bliss for comparative forensic analysis with Parkman.

Sohier then called medical experts (some of whom had testified for the prosecution) who conceded that it was difficult to identify the body or how the man had died. William T. G. Morton said that if the jawbone found in the furnace "were placed among a dozen others which I can produce, I should not be led to pick it out from any peculiarity." He placed several false teeth of his own into Keep's mold, and they fit smoothly. Sohier called the prosecution's case "indirect, presumptive, and circumstantial"; the defense then rested and the rebuttal started. Three dentists stated that an artist would recognize his own handiwork, and a physician estimated the condition of the remains to match up with the time for which Parkman had disappeared.

The defense then gave a six-hour speech on four key points that the prosecution had to prove: that the body was Parkman's, that a homicide had occurred, that Webster had perpetrated it, and that he had done so with malice aforethought. The defense contended that since Parkman had been seen leaving the College on Friday afternoon, the prosecution's case was in tatters. Moreover, they said, even if the body was Parkman's, anyone could have killed him and disposed of his body where it was found.

Clifford made his own closing argument lasting more than a day. He emphasized that strong medical testimony had been presented. He said that, beyond a reasonable doubt, Parkman was dead, found cut up inside the lab. He reminded the jury of Webster's financial situation and actions before Parkman's disappearance.

Webster himself then took the stand, against his attorneys' strong advice. In a fifteen-minute speech, he criticized his attorneys and presented his own version of the evidence, after which he called on the author of the anonymous letters to reveal himself; none did so.

Shaw then made a historic statement, replete with bias against the defendant, in which he made a precedent-setting ruling. He said that the jury only needed to find beyond a reasonable doubt that the remains were Parkman's; at the time, the standard in murder cases was proof "to an absolute certainty" that the dead body was that of the victim. Just before 8 pm on March 30, he charged the jury with producing a verdict on the defendant's guilt or innocence.

The jury began deliberations with a prayer and then reviewed the evidence. They voted unanimously that the remains were Parkman's, that Webster had killed him, and that he had done so deliberately. They returned at 10:45 pm, stating that they had reached a verdict. The crowd filtered back in, and Webster was led inside. The clerk asked for their finding. The foreman replied, "Guilty!" Then, as Bemis writes, "The prisoner, who upon the sentence of the jury had turned deadly pale, but who had stood up with a firm bearing to receive the verdict of the jury, immediately upon its announcement, grasped the rail in front of him, and slowly sank down into his seat. Dropping his head, he rubbed his eyes beneath his spectacles with a trembling and convulsed motion as if to wipe away tears, and remained in that position a few moments."

On April 1, Shaw sentenced Webster to be hanged.

Reactions were sharply divided. The Evening Bulletin wrote on April 2 that "Scarcely one man in ten thousand can be found who does not agree with us in the opinion that the evidence for the defence was sufficient to create a doubt of the unhappy man's guilt", while four days later, the Massachusetts Ploughman claimed that "We have scarcely met a man of intelligence, since the evidence has all come out, who did not profess to believe in Webster's guilt."

== Execution ==
On May 4, Webster's lawyers submitted a petition for a writ of error against Judge Shaw and his instructions to the jury. The hearing was held before Shaw and his four associates on June 12, and the writ denied. Webster appealed to Governor George N. Briggs for a pardon, asserting his innocence. Briggs was a lay preacher who did not wish to be seen bowing to Brahmin pressure, which strongly favored a commutation. Moreover, the year before, Washington Goode, a black sailor, had been hanged for the murder of a fellow black sailor based on circumstantial evidence. To have pardoned Webster after sending Goode to the gallows would have undermined his reputation. As The Fall River Weekly News put it:

If any delays, misgivings or symptoms of mercy are manifested, the gibbeted body of Washington Goode will be paraded before the mind's eye of his Excellency. If he relents in this case, though the entire population of the State petition for a remission of sentence, Governor Briggs will forfeit all claim to public respect as a high minded, honorable and impartial chief magistrate. He can do one of two things and retain his character as a man and a public servant: resign his office, or let the law take its course.

He signed the death warrant.

The crime, as sketched some years afterward.

In June, Webster wrote a confession. He admitted to killing Parkman in self-defense when the latter had become aggressive over the debt. He said that it was an unpremeditated rage, an act of passion and provocation, not a malicious murder. He said that Parkman "was speaking and gesticulating in the most violent and menacing manner" about the mineral cabinet being put up to cover another loan, and that in his fury he, Webster:

seized whatever thing was handiest - it was a stick of wood - and dealt him an instantaneous blow with all the force that passion could give it. It was on the side of his head, and there was nothing to break the force of the blow. He fell instantly upon the pavement. There was no second blow. He did not move.

He also admitted to authoring an anonymous letter.

Despite renewed calls for a commutation, the Governor and Council remained unmoved, the sentence remained final, and Webster was taken to Boston's Leverett Street Jail on August 30, 1850, and publicly hanged. He died within four minutes and was buried in the Copp's Hill Burying Ground. After the hanging, Parkman's widow was the first contributor to a fund created for Webster's impoverished widow and daughters.

An article in the November 23, 1884 Boston Globe discussed the possibility that Webster was placed in a harness, and was never hanged. A story is re-told about a sailor seeing Webster in Fayal (or Faial), Azores, long after his death sentence. Other witnesses describe how Webster's body was moved from the gallows site, and was going to be taken to a neighbor's house. There was a concern his body would be stolen, and security precautions were taken. The article also asserted Webster's body was placed in Copp's Hill Burying Ground in his father's tomb.

== Legacy ==
The case proved enduring in its impact as the first in the United States where dental evidence, and scientific testimony were accepted in a murder trial. Debate continued for years about a number of its aspects. When Charles Dickens visited Boston in 1867, among his first requests was to see the room where Parkman had been murdered.

A century after the trial, one author observed, "the Parkman murder case stands as a classic example of how a jury can reach a sound verdict despite an unfair trial." Another author claimed that the prosecutors ignored evidence that did not fit the case, Judge Shaw showed bias against Webster, whose confessor, Reverend George Putnam, was helping the prosecution, and statements were edited before appearing in the Bemis and Cushing Reports, which were a whitewash and issued to counteract a spate of negative publicity.

== In popular culture ==
- In 2023 the American film producer Dale Pollock published a vintage crime novel, Chopped: A Novel based on James Winchell Stone's stenographic account of the trial and presenting a fictional solving of the murder.
- The case was dramatized in the CBS radio program Crime Classics on July 13, 1953, in the episode entitled "The Terrible Deed of John White Webster," with Jay Novello portraying Webster.
- In 1991, the British historian Simon Schama published a book, Dead Certainties: Unwarranted Speculations, based in part on the case. He later participated in the making of a PBS documentary, Murder at Harvard, on the subject.
- The Murder of Dr. Parkman (2002) is another documentary, both about the case and the making of history.
- Based on the PBS documentary, Murder at Harvard, Untravel Media designed Walking Cinema: Murder on Beacon Hill, an iPhone application voiced by Alexandra McDougall, recognized to be the first iPhone application to be accepted to a major film festival.
- Blood and Ivy: The 1849 Murder That Scandalised Harvard by Paul Collins, published 2018.
- According to a brief book review in the Sept. 20, 1952 issue of The New Yorker, Fair Trial by Richard B. Morris has a section dealing with "the Parkman-Webster affair at Harvard."

== See also ==
- List of homicides in Massachusetts
