= Edward Dexter Sohier =

American lawyer

Edward Dexter Sohier (1810–1888) was an American lawyer who defended John White Webster in a murder trial in 1850.

== Early days ==
Edward Dexter Sohier was the son of William Davies Sohier and Elizabeth Amory (Dexter) Sohier and was born in Boston, Massachusetts, on April 24, 1810. He graduated at Harvard in 1829 and was admitted to the Suffolk bar in October, 1832.

== Career ==
In 1838, Sohier formed a partnership with Charles A. Welch, which continued until his death. He was remembered as a profound lawyer, full of resources, forcible in argument, sharp in repartee and conscientious in his management of cases, "as witty as Sydney Smith and more agreeable." At a meeting of the Suffolk bar to pay tribute to his memory, the presiding officer, Edward Bangs, said, "As a lawyer he stood among the first; as a man, his courtesy, his honesty, his untarnished honor, the severe strictness of his integrity, made him remarkable, even among associates abounding in such virtues." He married, February 16, 1836, Hannah Louisa Amory, and died November 23, 1888.

== Webster trial ==
He is best known for being the junior counsel with Pliny T. Merrick in the Parkman–Webster murder case (1850). Sohier and Merrick lost the case and Webster was hanged, but Sohier's and Webster's detailed notes from the case survive at the Massachusetts Historical Society, providing insight into the conduct of the defendant, the trial and the actions of his counsel not available elsewhere.

One historian characterized Sohier's appearance in 1850 at the Webster trial as

...striking. Of medium build, his gray moustache and long sideburns framed his semi-bald, handsome head. The wrinkles between and above his white eyebrows gave indication of the seriousness of this man who was the founder of ... one of Boston's most prestigious and probably oldest firms.

Quiet by nature, fastidiously ethical and courteous to the court, Sohier was essentially a civil or commercial lawyer, a fiduciary rather than a criminal defense lawyer. It is unusual that in 1850 he defended in a trial which at that time was the most sensational murder trial in America's history.

== Archives and records ==
- Sohier and Welch records at Baker Library Special Collections, Harvard Business School
