= James Henry Blake =

American city marshal

City Marshal of Boston
- In office May 1, 1840 – 1845
- Succeeded by: Ira Gibbons

Personal details
- Born: October 7, 1808 Boston, Massachusetts, United States
- Died: August 1, 1874 (aged 65) Boston Harbor, Massachusetts, United States
- Spouse: Marianne Wildes
- Parent(s): Edward Blake and Sarah (Parkman) Blake
- Relatives: George Parkman (uncle)
- Occupation: Merchant, real estate broker, City Marshal

James Henry Blake (October 7, 1808 – August 1, 1874) was the City Marshal of Boston from 1840 to 1845. He was a son of Edward Blake and Sarah (Parkman) Blake and nephew of George Parkman. The Parkmans and Blakes were two prominent families of the Boston Brahmins who were well respected merchants.

== Early life and career ==
Blake established himself as a merchant and real estate broker and also served in the Massachusetts Artillery as Major of Independents Cadets beginning in 1830. In 1831, while conducting business aboard the ship Mentos, two pirates boarded the boat where Blake witnessed their arrest. He testified against the pirates in the first of his many court appearances.

On May 12, 1835, he married Marianne Wildes of Boston and ran his brokerage on State Street. He was appointed City Marshal of Boston on May 1, 1840, at an annual salary of $1,000.00. Most of Blake's term as Marshal was involved overseeing July 4 celebrations on the Common, taking a census of buildings, banning illegal hay scales along the wharf, and clearing the streets of snow. He also passed a leash law forbidding large dogs to roam the streets. The most violence he saw was snowball fights, against which he swiftly levied hefty fines. For his diligence, he received a salary increase of $100 in 1844.

Blake was replaced as Marshal by Ira Gibbons in 1845, whereafter he returned to the business of real estate. He opened an office on State Street and later, as his business grew, moved to Congress Street. In 1847, Blake, along with police officer Samuel D. Fuller, helped recover articles stolen from Ebenezer Mann, another merchant.

In May 1849, the City of Boston and 17 citizens petitioned to have Blake return to fill the post and oust their City Marshal, Francis Tukey, but Tukey kept the position.

== Disappearance of George Parkman ==
On November 23, 1849, after Blake's uncle, George Parkman disappeared after not returning from lunch, the Parkman family began a search with Blake and his brother Edward. While Edward went to City Marshal Tukey to appeal for police help, James searched in Boston. Tukey sent police officers to drag the river and search the areas the doctor frequented. On November 25, Blake was standing outside the Harvard Medical College, speaking to police officer Trenholm, when he was approached by one of the professors from the College, John White Webster who was eventually found to be responsible for Parkman’s Murder

After this encounter James met William V. Thompson, the City Clerk. Thompson told James that he had seen his uncle the afternoon of November 23, just after 2:00 p.m. He also told him he had spoken to Webster about Parkman and Webster told him that Parkman was angry and excited regarding Webster's failure to pay on the outstanding debt to him. On November 30, 1849, Parkman's remains were found by the College janitor in Webster's privy. Blake requested his own Medical Examiner, Charles T. Jackson, be present to examine the remains.

Blake recounted his meeting with Webster in the court trial. At the end of the twelve-day trial, Webster was found guilty. Amid the furor of the verdict, Blake returned to his business.

Blake was involved in other court cases, either as a juror or a plaintiff. Two of his appearances as plaintiff involved the burglary of his clothes. James Henry Blake died on August 1, 1874, in a boating accident in the Boston Harbor.
