= Constitutional Telegraphe =

American newspaper

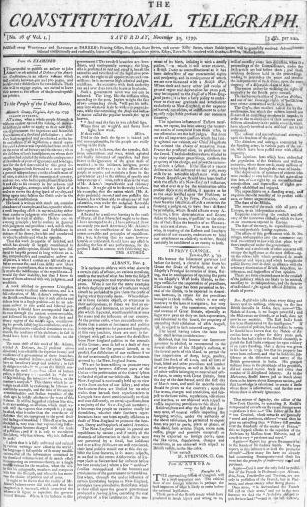
- The Constitutional Telegraph, November 1799
- Type: Biweekly newspaper
- Format: Broadsheet
- Founded: 1799
- Ceased publication: 1802
- Political alignment: Democratic-Republican Party (Thomas Jefferson)
- Headquarters: Boston, Massachusetts

The Constitutional Telegraphe (1799–1802) was a newspaper produced in Boston, Massachusetts, at the turn of the 19th century. The paper sympathized with the Democratic-Republican Party, and supported Thomas Jefferson. Publishers included Samuel S. Parker, Jonathan S. Copp, John S. Lillie, and John Mosely Dunham. The paper was originally called the Constitutional Telegraph. The "e" was added to Telegraphe with the 1 January 1800 issue. This issue included a new engraved masthead of an eagle and the motto "We advocate the rights of man."

== Samuel S. Parker ==
The first editor, Samuel Stillman Parker (1776–1811), was a doctor who trained under his father the Reverend Isaiah Parker, MD of Harvard, Massachusetts. Samuel S. Parker married Rebecca Thomas, the niece of the Worcester-based patriot printer, Isaiah Thomas. A variety of circumstantial evidence suggests that Isaiah Parker purchased a printing press, type, paper, and book stock from John Mycall of Newburyport, Massachusetts in 1798 in partial exchange for land in Harvard. The elder Parker's name appeared in the 1800 Boston Directory as the newspaper's publisher and editor. However, the paper's first 2 October 1799 masthead shows that Samuel S. Parker was the original editor. Samuel S. Parker sent the Constitutional Telegraphe to presidential candidate Thomas Jefferson gratis.

== Jonathan S. Copp ==
With the 10 July 1800 issue, Jonathan S. Copp took over as printer and editor of the newspaper, while Parker retained ownership.

== John S. Lillie ==
With the 27 September 1800 issue, John S. Lillie took over as editor and owner of the newspaper. In his final issue, Samuel S. Parker wrote that domestic circumstances and advocations prevented him from giving the paper the attention that it needs. In February, 1802, Lillie was indicted for libel against Judge Francis Dana, and on conviction was fined $100, and sentenced to three months' imprisonment. He bade farewell to the readers of the Telegraphe in a long article dated 'Boston Gaol, March 30 — 19th day of Imprisonment.'

On 12 October 1803, Lillie sent a bill to Jefferson for $4.50 for the gratis issues that Lillie continued to send following Parker's lead, explaining to Jefferson that his imprisonment for libel led to financial difficulties. In the letter, Lillie wrote "You no doubt will recollect Sir, that the Constitutl. Telegraphe, was, at one time, the only decidedly Republican Paper in this State.". Lillie concluded by expressing his satisfaction in Jefferson's election.

== John M. Dunham ==
On 14 April 1802, the paper was issued in the name of J.M. Dunham as printer and editor, who, a few weeks later, changed the title to Republican Gazetteer."

== The Constitutional Telegraphe as partisan press ==
Some historians dismiss the Telegraphe as relatively insignificant. Justin Winsor, for instance, writes: "the ultra-Republican organ ... [was] unable to show any reason for its existence, lasted but about three years. ... The Telegraphe was but one of several papers which the ill-considered enthusiasm of political parties set on foot in the last years of the century, which lived a few months or a few years, and died leaving no sign."

Modern print and journalism historians such as Carol Sue Humphrey point out that 19th-century historians did not understand the role and tone of early political newspapers, and so they dismissed the papers as being insignificant or non-objective as shown in the Winsor quote. Furthermore, having achieved their goal of electing Jefferson, many partisan Republican newspapers had no further reason to exist.

== Image gallery ==
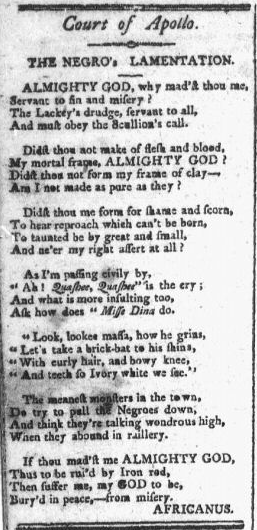
"The Negro's Lamentation" by "Africanus", Telegraphe, April 1800

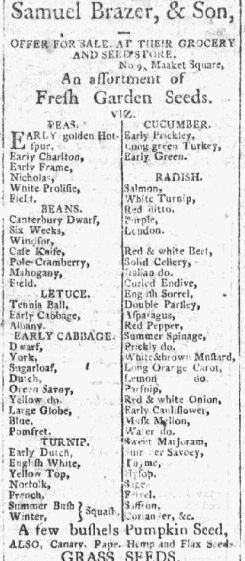
Ad for Brazer & Sons "fresh garden seeds", Market Square, Boston, 1801

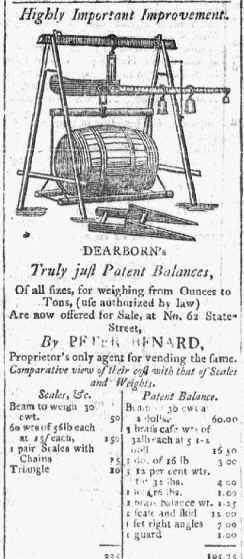
Ad for Benjamin Dearborn's patent balances, 1801

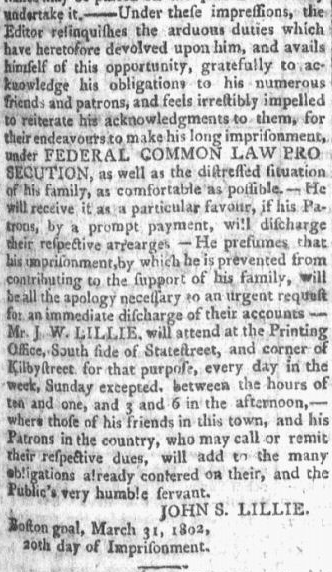
Excerpt of Lillie's letter from the Boston jail, "20th day of imprisonment", March 21, 1802
