= Susan Hinckley Bradley =

American painter (1851–1929)

- Born: Susan Greenough Hinckley; 15 May 1851; Boston, Massachusetts, US
- Died: 11 June 1929 (aged 78); Boston, Massachusetts, US
- Education: School of the Museum of Fine Arts at Tufts; Pennsylvania Academy of the Fine Arts
- Known for: Painting
- Spouse: Leverett Bradley (m. 1879)

Susan Hinckley Bradley (15 May 1851 – 11 June 1929) was an American painter known for her watercolor landscapes and portrait drawings.

== Early years ==
On 15 May 1851, Susan Greenough Hinckley was born in Boston, to Samuel Lyman Hinckley (1810–1871) and Anne Cutler (née Parker) Hinckley (1813–1898). Her paternal grandparents were Jonathan Huntington Lyman and Sophia (née Hinckley) Lyman. Her maternal grandparents were Samuel Dunn Parker and Elizabeth (née Mason) Parker, the daughter of U.S. Senator Jonathan Mason. Her aunt, Sally Outram Lyman, was married to agricultural writer Richard Lamb Allen. Her younger brother was painter Robert Cutler Hinckley.

She began her art studies in Boston at the School of the Museum of Fine Arts, studying with Frederic Crowninshield, and at the Pennsylvania Academy of the Fine Arts in Philadelphia, as well as with Abbott Thayer, William Merritt Chase, John Henry Twachtman, and Edward Darley Boit in Rome.

== Work ==
Her paintings can be found in Harvard University, Harvard Art Museum, Fogg Museum, in Cambridge, Massachusetts, at Smith College Museum of Art, Northampton, Massachusetts, and in the Museum of Fine Arts, Boston, as well as in numbers private collections.

She exhibited a painting, Mount Monadnock, at the 1893 World's Columbian Exposition.

She married a minister, Leverett Bradley, in 1879 and served as the editor of his Civil War memoir, Leverett Bradley: A Soldier-Boy's Letters, 1862-1865, A Man's Work in the Ministry, privately printed in Boston, 1905. She died in Boston on 11 June 1929.

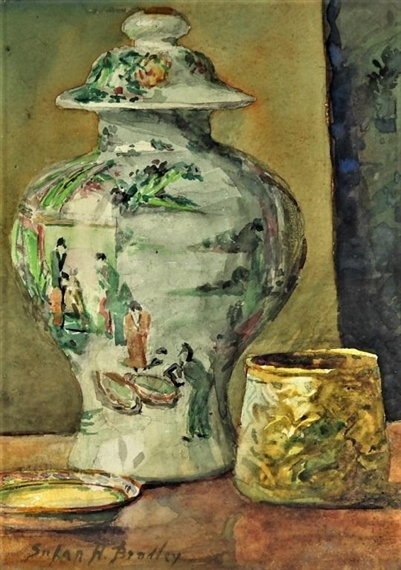
Oriental Still Life by Susan Hinckley Bradley
