= Josephine Collins =

American suffragist

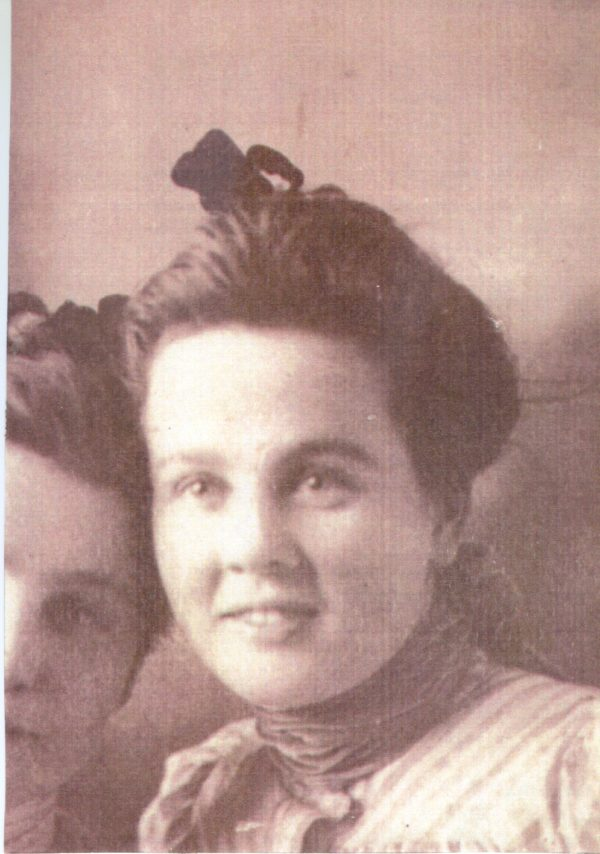
- Occupation: Suffragist

Josephine Collins (1879 – May 1, 1961) was a suffragist fighting for a woman's right to vote. She was the first born daughter of Irish immigrants Cornelius and Catherine (Horrigan) Collins. She had one sister and five brothers. The family lived in Framingham, Massachusetts.

== Suffrage movement ==
Collins joined the National Woman's Party in 1918. She and other women rallied on February 24, 1919 to greet President Woodrow Wilson on Boston Common. Wilson was traveling from Versailles, where he had World War I peace talks, to Washington D.C. and the protesters were there to protest the fact that Wilson did not give his opinion on suffrage. Holding signs which demanded the suffrage's amendment, Collins's sign read "Mr. President, how long must women wait for liberty?" The women were warned of arrest by the police if they did not leave. Collins along with twenty-two other women were arrested and then taken to the House of Detention for Women.

Collins and other women refused the court's request to give their real names and to pay a five dollar fine. Collins and the group were then transferred to the Charles Street Jail where they were to serve their jail sentence for eight days. Collins was released early when a brother paid her bail.

== Livelihood ==
Collins, who was single, owned a dry goods store in Framingham. She experienced boycotting of her store because of her stance on suffrage for women. She also owned a tea shop where women gathered without companions and discussed issues freely. Collins died unmarried in her native Framingham in 1961.
