= Derastus Clapp =

- Born: May 1, 1792; Claremont, New Hampshire, U.S.
- Died: June 1, 1881 (aged 89)
- Spouse: Susannah Bowditch (m. 1818)
- Police career
- Department: Boston Police Department
- Service years: 1828–1874 (46 years)
- Other work: Auction House Owner, Truant Officer

Derastus Clapp (May 1, 1792 – June 1, 1881) was head of the first city detective bureau in the United States, located in Boston, Massachusetts. He was appointed to the office of constable by the elderly Mayor Josiah Quincy in 1828, and was reappointed every succeeding year to 1874. In 1848, he was promoted to be one of the first detectives in the city. Clapp is most noted for his role in the arrest and prosecution of John White Webster for the murder of George Parkman.

== Biography ==
Clapp was born in Claremont, New Hampshire, but soon moved to Boston, after his marriage to Susannah Bowditch of Braintree, Massachusetts on February 15, 1818. He established an auction house, over which he presided for several years before he was appointed to the office of constable for the City of Boston in 1828. In 1832 and 1836, he was also captain of a ward militia company. According to an interview in the Boston Traveller on October 26, 1874, Clapp stated that "136 prisoners arrested by him were sent to the State Prison, and several hundred to the House of Correction, and that many thousand dollars worth of stolen property have been recovered by him and restored to its owners." He gained renown during his tenure as constable as "a successful detecter [sic] of crime" whose name would conjure "dread...among those who had reason to fear an arrest." There were reports that he would instill fear in the guilty without even approaching them. In 1850, most of the dread was harbored by school-aged children, as he was also an appointed truant officer. He and his assistant literally carried hundreds of children from all parts of the city back to the public school system.

In 1849, Clapp caught his "big break". A prestigious member of the Boston Brahmins was reported missing. Clapp's role in the investigation of the disappearance of Dr. George Parkman propelled him into international fame. His fame was short-lived, however, and in 1854, Boston established its first uniformed police force, with Constable Clapp as its less prominent member. His sole concern was ticketing illegally parked traffic on State Street and serving orders of notice issued by the City Clerk. In January 1874, a muscle tear in his right leg disabled him, but he continued his duties until October of that year. He retired on October 1, 1874 after 46 years of service.

== Derastus Clapp and the disappearance of Dr. Parkman ==
During 1849-50, Derastus Clapp participated in the investigation of the disappearance of Dr. George Parkman and the subsequent arrest and trial of Professor John White Webster for the murder of Parkman. Clapp's experience before this event was centered on less heinous crimes, such as burglary and counterfeiting, and he was initially unprepared for the demands required when dealing with homicide among the Boston elite.

November 23, 1849, was the last day Dr. Parkman was seen. Parkman's family notified Charles M. Kingsley, Parkman's business manager, that the doctor never returned home for lunch. The next day, November 24, he began a search of the city along with a half dozen police officers and a group of concerned citizens. The search continued as the family posted notices offering a reward of $3,000 for information related to Parkman's disappearance. Based on information acquired during the search, on November 26, 1849, Clapp, in addition to Kingsley and other officers, began focusing on the Harvard Medical College and surrounding areas. During the search of the college, Clapp made his deference to the upper class apparent.

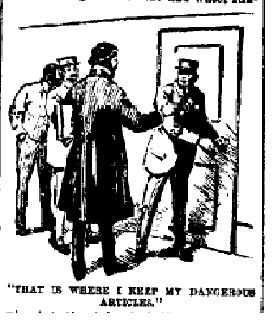
Steubenville Herald 1896

According to trial testimony by Mr. Kinsley, Clapp stated to Professor Webster that he was just following orders and no one in the college was a suspect. Clapp's hesitancy during the search is also on record. While searching Webster's laboratory, he started opening a door to a small room. When Webster told him that he kept his valuable and dangerous articles there, Mr. Clapp put his head as far as the door and turned back again, saying, "I will not go in to be blowed up."

As the investigation continued, and suspicion fell on the college as the scene of the crime, Clapp became more aggressive. The college's janitor, Ephraim Littlefield, had been conducting his own investigation, and found what were later to be identified as Dr. Parkman's remains under Webster's private privy. On November 30, a week after Parkman's disappearance, Clapp was again called to the college, where he was the first to view Littlefield's gruesome discovery. He was dispatched to Webster's house to make the arrest.

Clapp was not going to be made the fool twice. Having experience with the "rogues" of Boston, Clapp called upon his "devious Yankee" skills to lure the professor out of his house and into jail. He took a coach and two other officers for back-up and rode to Cambridge to the Webster residence. Leaving the coach and the other officers parked away from the house, Clapp approached Webster on his porch as he was escorting out a visitor. He requested Webster accompany him to the college to perform another search. Webster went back inside to get his hat and coat, but when he saw the coach and other officers, he suddenly remembered his keys. Clapp deterred his efforts to return to the house and told him they had keys enough to get in, "it was of no consequence."

Webster boarded silently as Clapp instructed the driver to go over Craigie's Bridge, where the police had been searching the waters earlier. After a few minutes of desultory conversation, Clapp broached the subject of the search efforts for the doctor and the progress the police had made. Webster confessed he had seen Dr. Parkman the week prior at the college, but the doctor had left the campus, still alive. During their conversation, the coach turned on to Brighton Street, and Webster became very agitated. "The driver is going the wrong way." Clapp tried to calm him by telling him the driver was "probably green" and would get it straightened out. When they stopped in front of the jail, Webster knew something was wrong. "What does this all mean?" Clapp escorted him into the jail and charged him with the murder of Dr. George Parkman.

Detective Clapp and the other officers continued their efforts while Webster was incarcerated. On December 5, 1849, Clapp executed a warrant to search the Webster house, meticulously and overtly following proper procedures during the course of the search. Evidence acquired during the search provided motive for the court to proceed in the prosecution of Professor John White Webster.

Although Derastus Clapp retired from the police force in 1874, he continued to serve in public office and retained his notoriety. In 1896, fifteen years after his death, a small paragraph in an Ohio paper noted:

They have extremely venerable policeman in Boston, Mr. Derastus Clapp. Who is ninety years old, has been in the department about forty-four years, and is at present in the special service of the board of street commissioners.
