= Boston Gaol (Massachusetts) =

Former jail in Boston, Massachusetts

Coordinates: 42°21′31.96″N 71°3′29.2″W

The Boston Gaol (1635–1822) was a jail in the center of Boston, Massachusetts, located off Court Street, in the block bounded by School, Washington and Tremont Streets. It was rebuilt several times on the same site, before finally moving to the West End in 1822. Prisoners included Quakers, "witches," pirates, murderers, rebels, debtors, and newspaper editors.

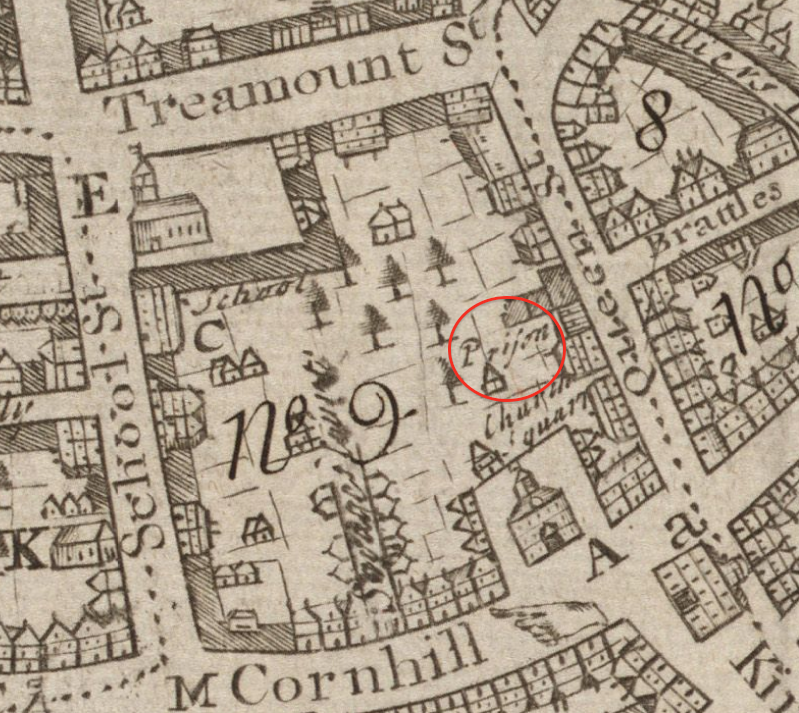
Detail of 1743 map of Boston, showing prison off Queen Street. Nearby on Cornhill was the Old Brick Church

== History ==
"Opened in 1635, the Boston Gaol served as Massachusetts' sole prison for eighteen years. ... As settlers fanned out into the wilderness, organizing new townships as they went, local facilities for incarceration sprang up elsewhere." The Boston Gaol sat on Prison Lane (1634–1708), which became later known as Queen Street (1708–1788), and then Court Street (from 1788). Around 1689, "the old stone gaol on Prison Lane [had] ... outer walls ... of stone three feet thick, its unglazed windows barred with iron, 'the cells partitioned off with plank, the doors covered with iron spikes, the passage-ways like the dark valley of the shadow of death.'" In 1704, a new building replaced the old on the same site.

"The prison and its dungeon were considerably repaired after the great fire of 1711, in that neighborhood, which destroyed the town house and first church. The keeper's house was also renovated." "The keys of the building were twelve to eighteen inches long and were expressive of the formidable character of the jail, the walls of which were three feet thick." "There is no reason to suppose that Boston Jail was any worse than most other prisons of that period. But that it was a forbidding place is amply attested by Daniel Fowle, the Boston printer, in his "Total Eclipse of Liberty:" ... 'If there is any such thing as a hell upon earth, I think this place is the nearest resemblance of any I can conceive of.'" "A new building designed by Governor Bernard replaced [the old] in 1767."

"The Massachusetts Charitable Society, at their quarterly meeting last Monday evening [in December 1797], unanimously voted a blanket for each prisoner now confined in Boston gaol, and as much fuel as will be necessary to keep them comfortable during the inclemency of the season." In 1805 "the sons of misfortune and penury, the debtors, now in Boston gaol, partook of the joys of Independence, on the 4th inst. The liberality of several gentlemen afforded them a handsome repast; and a number of appropriate toasts were given on the occasion."

By 1807 the "county gaol" appeared as "a plain stone building of considerable strength," located "in the rear of the court-house." "The jail [was] a three story building with corridors on the outside of the upper stories, in which were the prisoners confined for debt." In December 1819, there were "now confined in this gaol, poor debtors and poor criminals, as follows: 95 men, 29 women—total: 124. Of whom are destitute of clothing 19 men and 20 women." Through the years, gaol keepers included Mr. Salter (c. 1662); Richard Brackett (c. 1665); Seth Smith (c. 1711); William Young (c. 1740); Oliver Hartshorn (c. 1796).

The Leverett-street jail opened in 1822, replacing the old prison off Court Street. "In 1823 the old gaol was taken down, and its materials were partly used in constructing the gun house and ward room on Thacher Street" in the North End.

== Inmates ==
17th-century

- Mary Parsons, 1651; "accused for a witch"
- Mary Fisher and Anne Austin, Quakers, c. 1656
- Mary Clark, Richard Doudney, Quakers, c. 1657
- William Robinson, Marmaduke Stevenson, Quakers, c. 1659
- Goody Glover, c. 1688
- "Sarah Osburn, a victim to the witchcraft delusion; at first imprisoned in Salem village church, ... afterwards transferred to Boston Jail, where she died," 1692
- Sarah Cloyce - Salem Witch Trials - accused along with her two sisters, but survived.
- Sarah Wildes, hanged for witchcraft, 1692
- Captain John Alden, c. 1695
- Captain William Kidd, 1699

18th-century

- Mary Bressell, c. 1713, "for debt, three quarters of a year's rent of a brick house in Shrimpton's Lane"
- John Up Church, alias Browne, mariner, c. 1713, "for a debt ... to Fortune Ruddock, a licensed retailer. His bill, unpaid, was for meat, drink, washing, and lodging for twelve weeks and four days"
- James Franklin (printer), 1722
- Richard Fry, c. 1739
- Daniel Fowle (printer), 1754
- John Mein (publisher)
- Thomas Preston and others involved in the Boston Massacre, 1770
- "Lieut. Col. Parker, who was wounded at the battle of Bunker's Hill, and died in Boston gaol," 1794
- "Shattuck, Smith and Parker, leaders of the Middlesex riot," 1786

19th-century

- Jason Fairbanks, c. 1801
- John S. Lillie, editor of the Constitutional Telegraphe, for libel, 1802
- Thomas O. Selfridge, esq.
- Merrill Butler, 1812, for "abusing the liberty of the press" in The Scourge
- Michael Powars, c. 1820
- Warrington, Rosewain, and Homes, pirates, 1819-1820
- Elijah Bruce, c. 1822, "a victualler in the market: he was committed on a peace warrant issued on the complaint of his wife, and committed suicide by cutting his own throat with a razor."

== See also ==
- Leverett Street Jail (1822–1851)

== Images ==
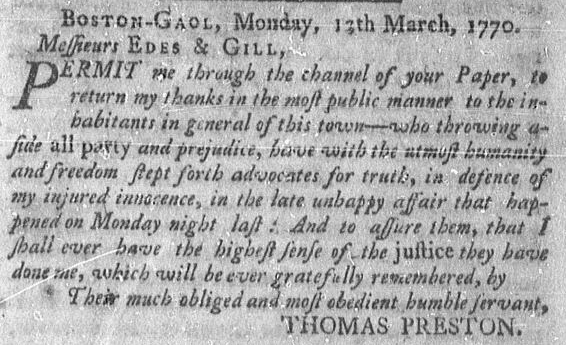
Newspaper item from prisoner Thomas Preston, 1770

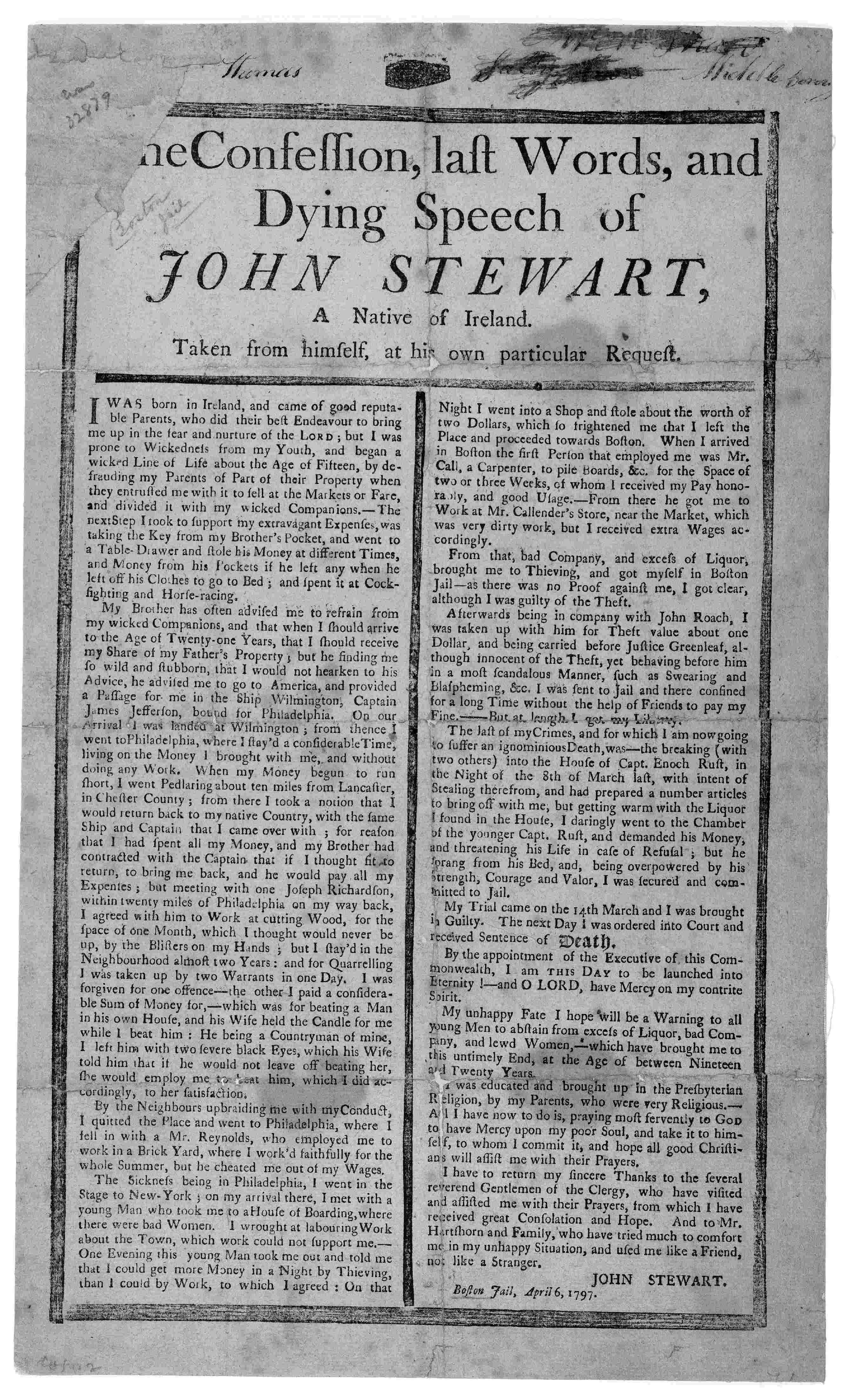
John Stewart confession, 1797 (Library of Congress)

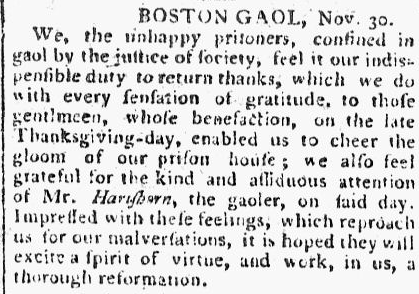
Boston Gaol, 1799

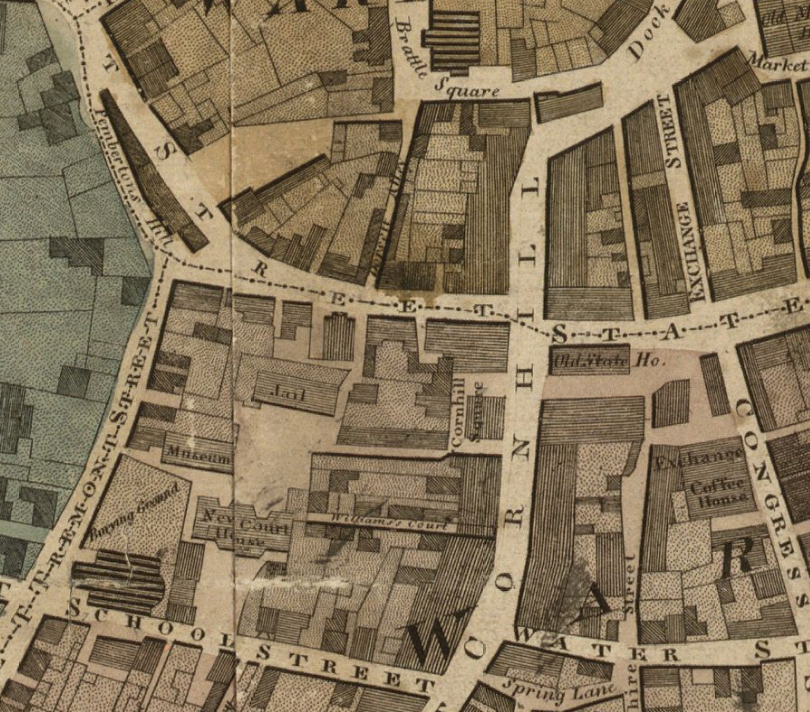
Detail of 1814 map of Boston, showing "jail." Nearby was the Columbian Museum

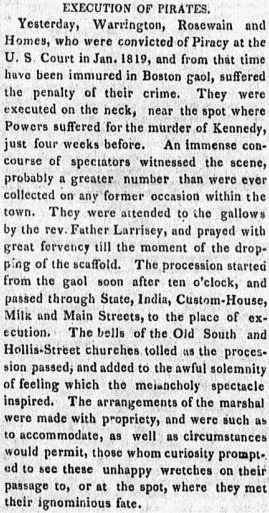
Description of procession of pirates from jail to place of execution, 1820
