= Francis Tukey =

American politician (1814–1867)

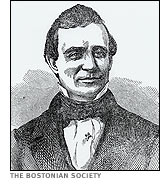
Francis Tukey

Francis Tukey (1814 - November 27, 1867) was the City Marshal of Boston, Massachusetts, from 1846 to 1852 and a member of the California State Assembly.

== Early history ==
Francis Tukey was born in Falmouth, Massachusetts (now in Maine) in 1814. His family was well established in the area of Falmouth. His father was Benjamin Tukey, as was also the name of his grandfather. His grandfather fought in the Battle of Saratoga during the American Revolution. Upon the town's celebration of the surrender of General Burgoyne, the elder Benjamin Tukey was killed accidentally. As the celebration had commenced around Alice Greele's Tavern, Benjamin was mortally wounded by the premature discharge of a cannon. Benjamin Tukey left behind two children: Benjamin, Francis's father, and William. Francis Tukey is described as "5 feet, 9 inches tall, hair black as a raven, eyes large, dark and piercing with a pale face and an infectious smile." Francis Tukey was a mechanic by trade and left Falmouth for Boston, Massachusetts to practice his trade further. After moving to Boston, he decided that he would pursue a career in law instead. Tukey entered the Harvard Law School and graduated after two years in 1843. Francis Tukey was admitted to the Suffolk bar on March 6, 1844.

Entering the law enforcement profession would be Tukey's calling and he would become appointed as the City Marshal of Boston by Mayor Josiah Quincy Jr. The position had been more of a revolving political door at the time. During the eight years between 1838 and 1846, there were six men appointed to the seat of city marshal. Francis Tukey was the successor to an office held by Benjamin Pollard, Daniel Parkman, Erza Weston, James Blake and Ira Gibbs. Tukey was appointed to the high-profile position at age 32.

== Tukey era as City Marshal of Boston ==
The early years of Tukey's era as marshal was relatively quiet compared to what he would encounter close to the end of the decade. He began with the reorganization of the Boston Police Department. Under Tukey, the force increased to 22 officers during the day and 8 at night. They were dispatched throughout the city at $2.00 per day and $1.25 per night. The city was divided into sections and the order was set to clean up the streets of Boston. The increased visibility of officers gave rise to local notoriety to certain constables, such as Derastus Clapp and Samuel Fuller.

During the 1848 public excavation on Boston Common, Tukey and his people discovered stolen money in front of an eager crowd. The January 7 excavation found $1100.00. This was the beginning of his public image in Boston and he welcomed the publicity.

He was in charge of the investigation of the Parkman–Webster murder in 1849–50. In 1851, he returned runaway slave Thomas Sims to Georgia after a court ordered compliance with the Fugitive Slave Law.

Shortly thereafter, Tukey began using raids to clean up the city. Tukey had an eye on vice establishments in the city. The early results of the first raid concluded that nine men and sixty women were arrested for prostitution. The following week's raid is known as the "Celebrated Ann Street" raid. There were over 150 arrests made in the red-light district of Boston on 23 April 1851. The targets were gamblers and prostitutes, with Tukey finding great success.

Again in 1851, Francis Tukey instituted a weekly "show-up of rogues." The policy he established was to have known criminals show up and be identified in public as criminals. This was to make sure that the public knew their faces and could identify the criminals if they had to. The first collection brought 76 pickpockets, burglars, thieves and more that were forced to "run a gauntlet of crowing citizens who tore their clothing and marked their backs with chalk."

The results of Francis Tukey's time as city marshal are varied. During Tukey's reign, it is believed that he neglected the growing number of wandering children in the Boston streets. The children, if taken in, would become apprentices or domestics until they reached adulthood. This was a rather "unenlightened attitude toward juvenile delinquency" in Boston at the time.

Francis Tukey would be the city marshal until 1852, a tenure lasting six years. Benjamin Seaver, the mayor, removed Francis Tukey and most of the Boston Police force and replaced him with Gilbert Nourse Esq (1852–1854). The resignation was forced. Upon his removal, Tukey decided to relocate to Sacramento, California.

== Move to California ==
Francis Tukey's decision to leave Boston for Sacramento was not an attempt to leave the public realm behind. Here he became a member of the California State Assembly, with a seat in the 16th District legislature beginning in 1863 and also a member of the Board of Levee. During his time on the Board of Levee, he helped decide the length of term and the process for the election of Levee officials. His time in California did encounter other notoriety as he came in front of the Supreme Court of California as an appeal was filed from a verdict rendered against him by the Sixth Judicial District of California. In this appeal, investment in property bought by another man, D. O. Mills, where Tukey was also an investor came before the court. The issue at hand was that Tukey was an investor on real estate property of lot 4 between J and K streets and Fourth and Fifth streets in Sacramento. The third that was in the possession of Judson and George B. Haycock was sold to Mills. During which time, the taxes had not been paid on the property. The sheriff in Sacramento was deeded to sell the property to recoup the money owed. Tukey, in having failed to pay the taxes, forced the property to be sold and left a loan of $4000.00 to Mill's debt. The selling of the property was eventually allowed, having the courts agreed to the original decision that the sheriff did have the right to sell the property to reclaim debts and the owner was now, in fact, D. O. Mills.

== Legacy ==
Francis Tukey "demonstrated the police as a constant, serious, full-time presence into the social spaces of (Boston)." He patrolled the streets of Boston with the great efficiency. According to Tukey, "there were 227 houses of prostitution known in Boston, along with 26 gambling dens operating and 1500 shops selling liquor, of which 900 were run by Irishmen." He was appointed by the Boston Brahmins to control the growing population of immigrants, especially the Irish who were typically used as scapegoats of the time. Tukey increased the police force and increased the operating budget each year. The police force was so well trained, that it could be brought into "service on any emergency, at short notice, with all the uniformity and efficiency of a disciplined army." Tukey helped clean the streets in an obviously busy time for Boston. "It may be a question whether Francis Tukey is to the municipality what Fouche` was to the court of Napoleon." He is considered to be the most efficient police officer ever in Boston. Francis Tukey "styled himself as Boston's own Eugène François Vidocq, in regards to the vigilant detection of offenders" by forcing criminals to parade in public and arresting groups of people during police raids. He is also considered by many to be the Napoleon of his time during his reign as city marshal.

== Death ==
Francis Tukey died in Sacramento, California on November 23, 1868.
