= Leverett Street Jail =

Jail in Boston, Massachusetts

The Leverett Street Jail (1822–1851) in Boston, Massachusetts served as the city and county prison for some three decades in the mid-19th century. Inmates included John White Webster. Notorious for its overcrowding, the facility closed in 1851, when inmates were installed in the nearby, newly built Charles Street Jail, also in the West End.

== History ==
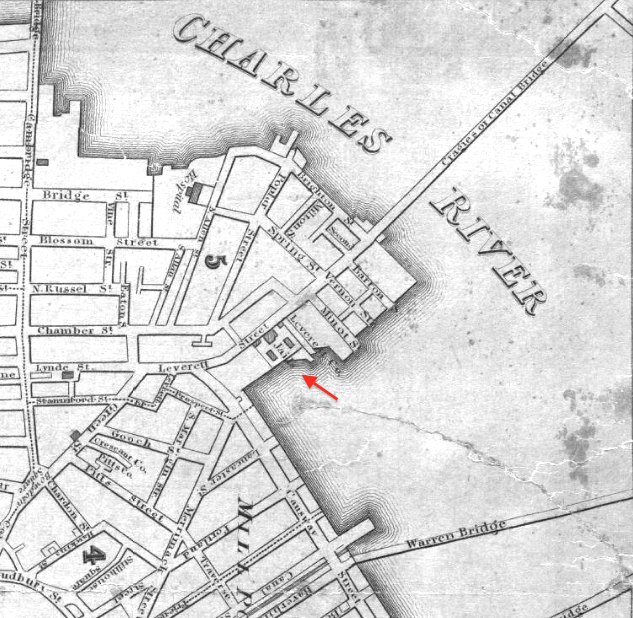
Detail of 1829 map of Boston, showing Leverett St. Jail in the West End

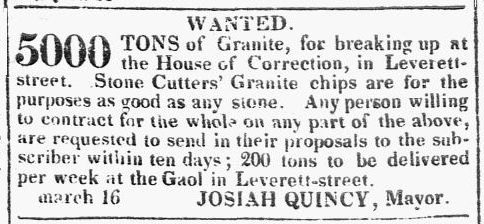
Advertisement seeking 5,000 tons of stone (for inmate labor) at the Leverett St. House of Correction, 1825 (Columbian Centinel)

Begun around 1819, the "new gaol in Leverett-street" opened in 1822. Prior to that time, many had recognized the previous town jail (since the 1630s located off Court Street) as inadequate.

In 1823, "on inspecting the common jails of the city, in Leverett Street, it was found that, of the two stone prisons there situated, one was amply sufficient for all the usual exigencies of the courts of justice. It was determined, therefore, to convert the other into a house of correction, and employ the inmates in the adjoining jail-yard in hammering stone and like materials." Thus "there were two separate prisons within the same enclosure."

=== Architecture ===
Architecturally, "the Leverett Street jail was considered very secure, walls and floors being composed of large blocks of hewn stone clamped together with iron, while between the courses loose cannon-balls were laid in cavities hollowed out for the purpose."

=== Inmates ===
Don Pedro Gibert and his pirate associates on trial in Boston in 1834 were held in the Leverett Street jail. In 1835 abolitionist William Lloyd Garrison was held in the jail temporarily for his own protection when a mob turned against him.

Others held in the prison included, for instance, people in custody after police raids on Ann Street. One night in 1851, "165 persons of all ages, sexes, nations and colors ... were marched off in pairs to the Leverett Street Jail ... for the various crimes of piping, fiddling, dancing, drinking, and all their attendant vices."

Executions took place at the jail. In 1831, "Joseph Gadett and Thomas Colinett [were hanged] ... for piracy," and in 1834 Henry Joseph also. In 1850, Dr. Webster of the highly publicized George Parkman murder case was executed.

=== Conditions in the prison ===
The conditions in the jail were widely criticized. Prisoners lived crowded together, regardless of the mildness (e.g. minor debt) or severity of their crime. "The new, costly, and elegant prison ... is so constructed as not to admit of a proper separation of its inmates." By 1831, "the true character of this place is beginning to be understood:"

The crowded night rooms; the 1,000 debtors annually, and the 1,000 criminals and vagrants; the men and the women; the old men and black boys; the idiots, the lunatics and the drunkards; all confined in two buildings at night, and on the Sabbath, in which there can be no separation, and no effectual supervision or restraint, to prevent gambling and falsehood, profane swearing and lascivious conversation, wrath, strife, backbiting and revenge.

In 1833 the city built a new House of Correction in South Boston, designed on the Auburn system (an improvement at the time). After 1833 "as the city and county lock-up the Leverett Street Jail held inmates who were awaiting trial and also those who had been sentenced to the [South Boston] House of Correction and were waiting for transport there. " "De Beaumont and de Tocqueville declared the House of Correction in South Boston to be a model for similar establishments, and the county jail in Leverett Street just the opposite." In other words, conditions improved for inmates in the new South Boston prison, but remained objectionable for inmates remaining at Leverett Street.

In 1851, amid continued criticism of the prison, it was replaced by the Charles Street Jail. The old jail building on Leverett Street stood until at least 1856.

== See also ==
- Boston Gaol (Massachusetts)
- Charles Street Jail
