= Charles Street Jail =

- Suffolk County Jail
- U.S. National Register of Historic Places
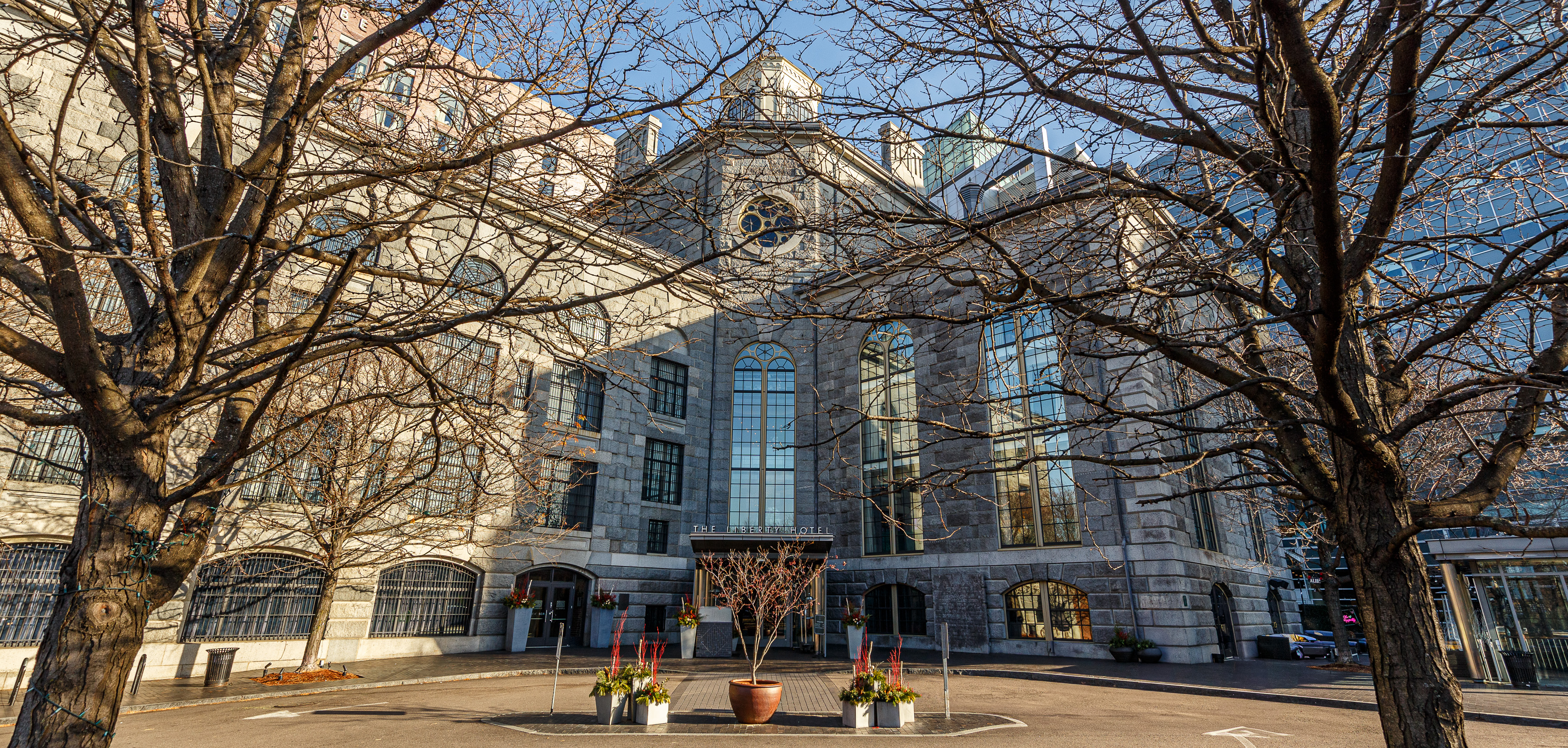
- 2024

- Location within Boston Location within Massachusetts Location within the United States
- Location: Boston, Massachusetts
- Coordinates: 42°21′43″N 71°4′13″W
- Built: 1851
- Architect: Gridley J. F. Bryant
- NRHP reference No.: 80000670
- Added to NRHP: April 23, 1980

Liberty Hotel

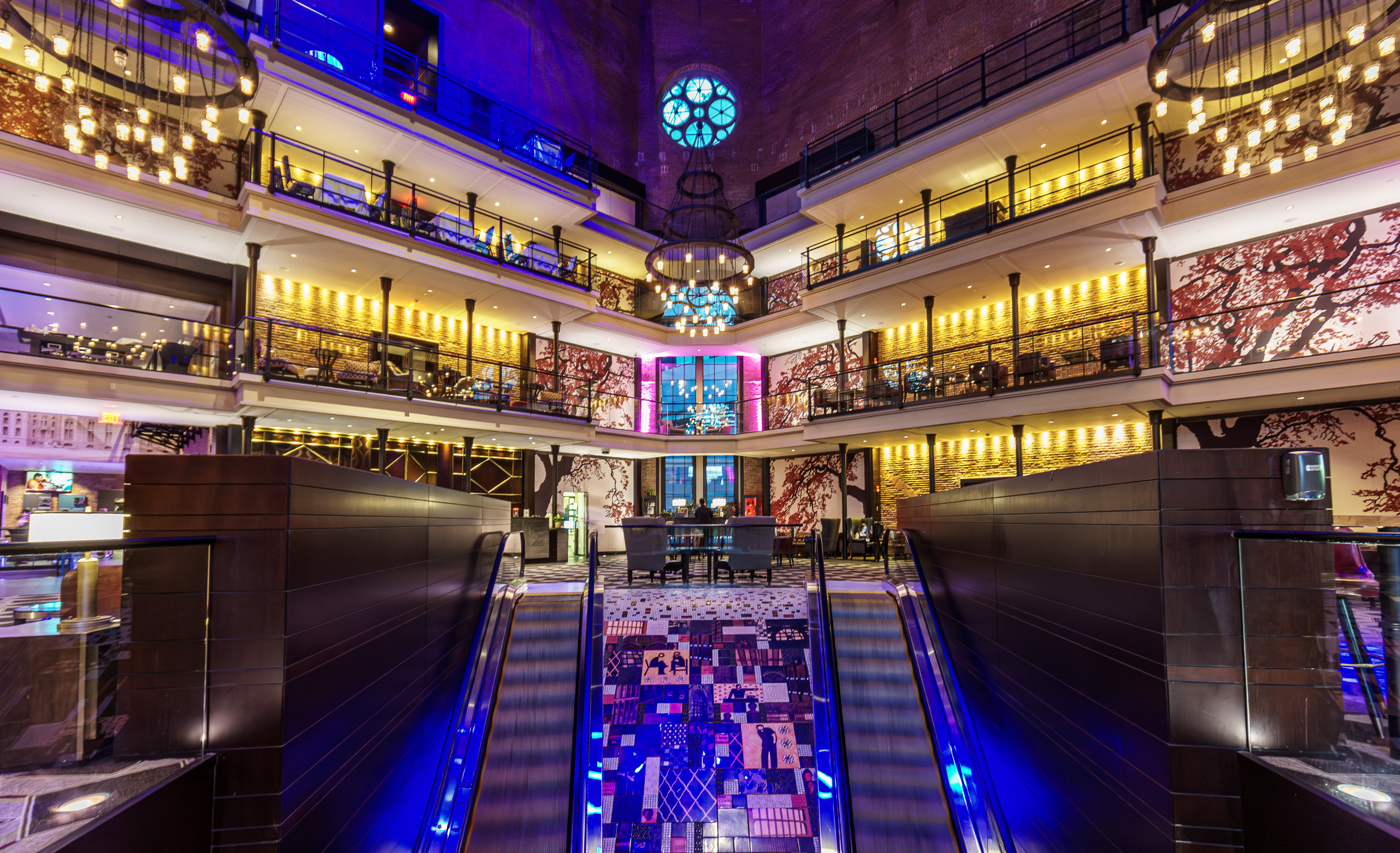
Lobby and Bar

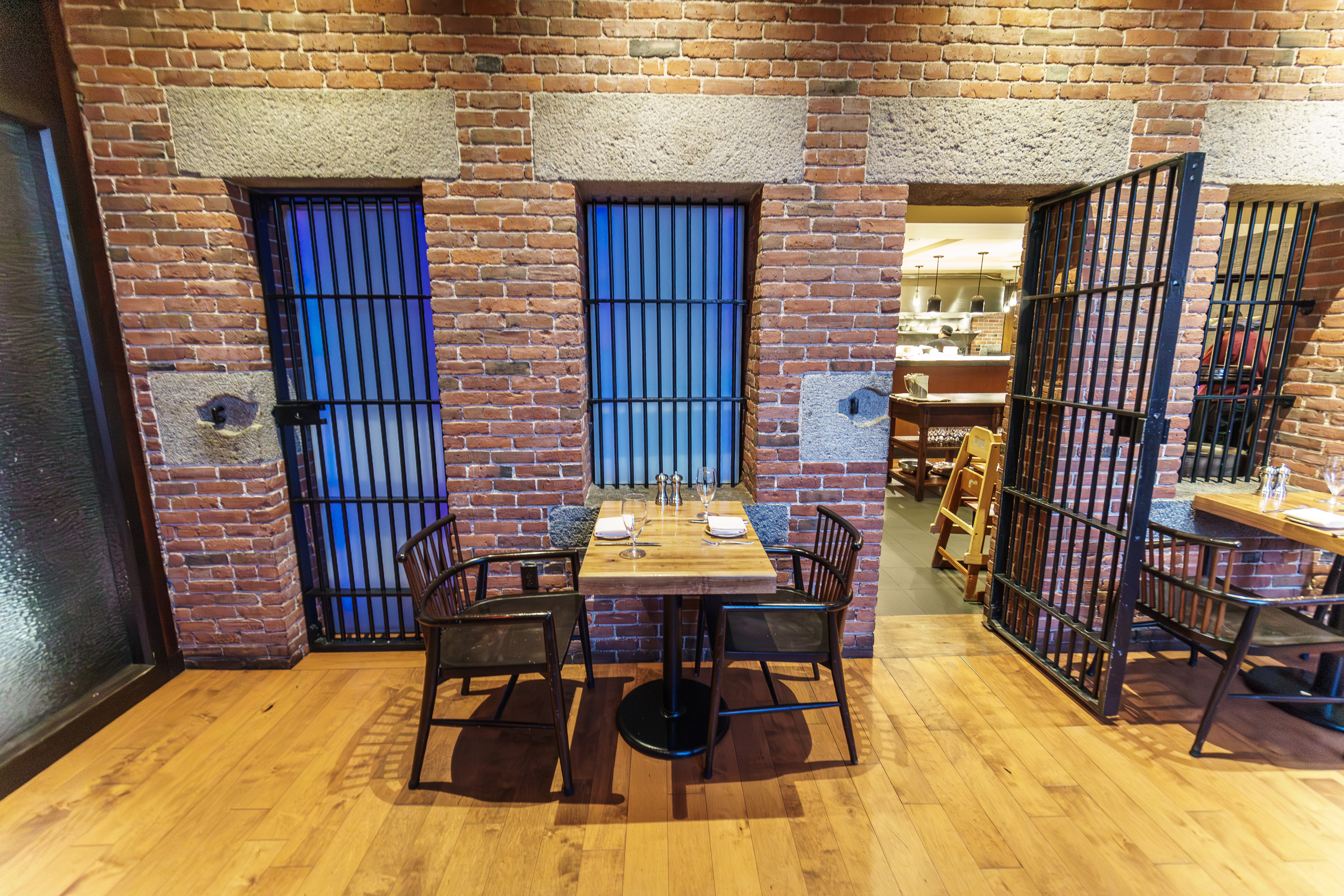
CLINK restaurant

The Charles Street Jail (built 1851), also known as the Suffolk County Jail, is an infamous former jail (later renovated into a luxury hotel) located at 215 Charles Street, Boston, Massachusetts. It is listed in the state and national Registers of Historic Places. The Liberty Hotel, as it is now known, has retained much of its historic structure, including the famed rotunda.

== History ==
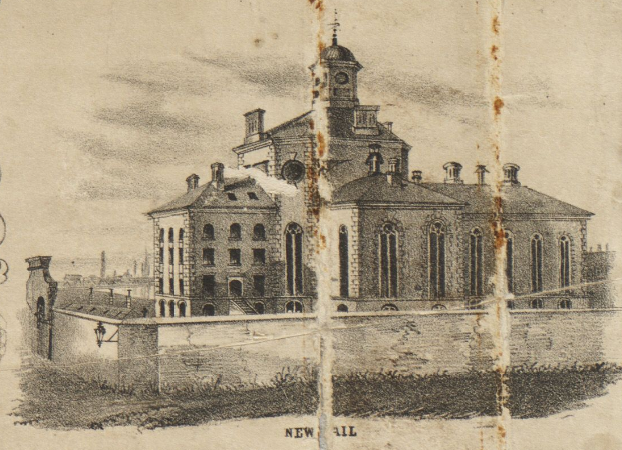
Boston, 1852. Detail from: Henry McIntyre's "Map of the City of Boston and Immediate Neighborhood."

The jail was proposed by Mayor Martin Brimmer in his 1843 inaugural address as a replacement for the Leverett Street Jail which had been built in 1822. Normally jails of this sort were county institutions, but, since Boston, then and now, dominates Suffolk County, Mayor Brimmer was a key player in the jail's planning and development.

The jail was constructed between 1848 and 1851 to plans by architect Gridley James Fox Bryant and the advice of prison reformer, Rev. Louis Dwight, who designed it according to the 1790s humanitarian scheme pioneered in England known as the Auburn Plan. The original jail was built in the form of a cross with four wings of Quincy granite extending from a central, octagonal rotunda with a 90-foot-tall (27 m) atrium. The wings allowed segregation of prisoners by sex and category of offense, and thirty arched windows, each 33 feet high, provided ventilation and natural light. The original jail contained 220 granite cells, each 8 by 10 feet (2.4 m × 3.0 m).

Over the years, the jail housed a number of famous inmates including John White Webster, James Michael Curley, Malcolm X, and Sacco and Vanzetti. Suffragists imprisoned for protests when President Woodrow Wilson visited Boston in February 1919 included Josephine Collins (Framingham), Betty Connolly (West Newton), Martha Foley (Dorchester), Frances Fowler (Brookline), Nellie Gross (Mrs. J. Irving Gross, Boston), and Rosa Heinzen Roewer (Belmont). They were imprisoned for eight (8) days. Also imprisoned were World War II prisoners of war from the German submarines U-234 and U-873. The commanding officer of the latter U-boat, who died in the jail, was the brother of Operation Paperclip rocket scientist Ernst Steinhoff.

In 1973, the US District Court ruled that, because of overcrowding, the jail violated the constitutional rights of the prisoners housed there. Nonetheless, the prison did not close until 1990. On Memorial Day of that year, prisoners were moved to the new Nashua Street Jail on Nashua Street.

The former Charles Street Jail building is now owned by Massachusetts General Hospital. It was redesigned by Cambridge Seven Associates and Ann Beha Architects (now named Annum Architects), and reopened in the summer of 2007 as a 300-room luxury hotel with a number of high-end bars and restaurants. The Liberty Hotel, as it is now known, has retained much of the building's historic structure, including the famed rotunda. A 16-story guest room addition during construction was designed to approximate the existing structure around it.

== Former inmates ==
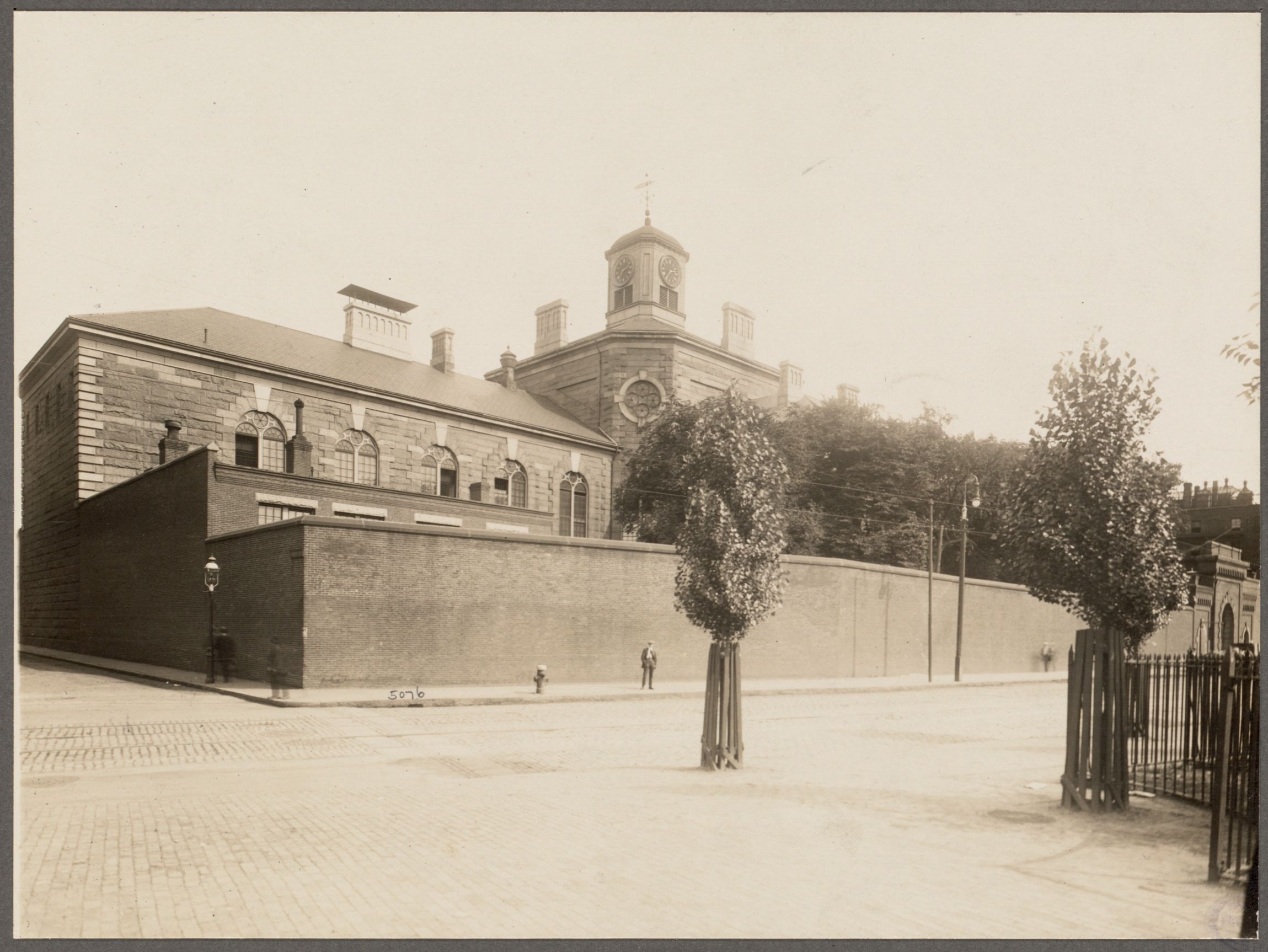
Charles Street Jail

- Elmer "Trigger" Burke - mob hit man. Escaped from the jail following his arrest for murder.
- Josephine Collins - suffragist
- John J. Divivo - Hijacker/murderer. Hanged himself in the jail.
- William M. Forgrave - temperance activist turned stock broker. Convicted of larceny. Allegedly ran a bookmaking operation in the jail during the reign of Sheriff John F. Dowd
- William Monroe Trotter - civil rights activist
- Shunsuke Tsurumi

== See also ==
- National Register of Historic Places listings in northern Boston, Massachusetts
