= George Parkman =

American doctor and businessman (1790–1849)

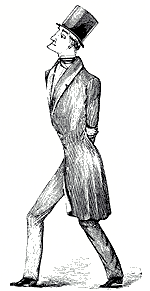
- George Parkman, "The Pedestrian"
- Born: George Parkman; February 19, 1790; Beacon Hill, Boston, Massachusetts, United States
- Died: November 23, 1849 (aged 59); Beacon Hill, Boston, Massachusetts, United States
- Cause of death: murder
- Occupations: physician, real estate developer, landlord
- Known for: Parkman–Webster murder case
- Relatives: Francis Parkman Junior (nephew) Quincy Adams Shaw (nephew); James Henry Blake (nephew) Robert Gould Shaw (grandnephew)

George Parkman (February 19, 1790 – November 23, 1849) was an American doctor, businessman, and philanthropist, as well the victim in the sensationally gruesome Parkman–Webster murder case, which shook Boston in 1849–1850.

== Family ==
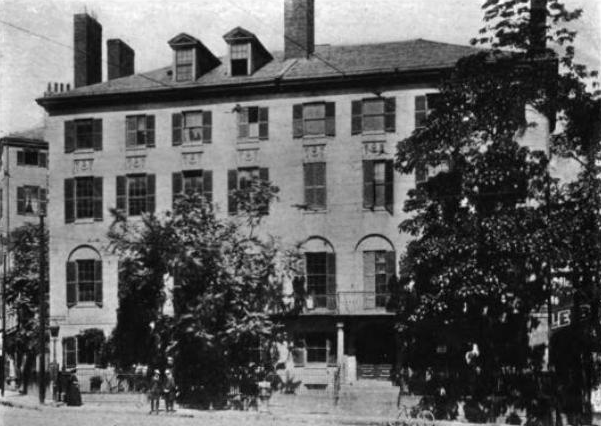
House of Samuel Parkman (father of George Parkman), Bowdoin Square, Boston, 1912.

Parkman was born to Samuel Parkman (August 22, 1751 – June 11, 1824) and Sarah Rogers, Boston Brahmin and one of the richest families in Boston. Parkman has four siblings: Elizabeth (1785), Francis (1788), Samuel (1791), and Daniel (1794). Samuel Parkman had also had six children by his previous marriage to Sarah Shaw. Samuel Parkman, George's father and family patriarch, had bought up low-lying lands and income properties in Boston's West End. He also founded and was part owner of the towns of Parkman, Ohio and Parkman, Maine. His sons from his first marriage oversaw the Ohio properties, while his second set of boys were responsible for the Maine parcel. Samuel's daughters inherited wealth as well. The most notable was George's sister Elizabeth Willard Parkman, whose spouse Robert Gould Shaw (1776 – 1853), grandfather of Robert Gould Shaw (October 10, 1837 – July 18, 1863, Union Army colonel during the American Civil War), grew his wife's share of the fortune to become the senior partner in the most powerful commercial house in a city glutted with the proceeds of the China Trade.

The eleven Parkman scions united in marriage with the Beacon Hill families of Blake, Cabot, Mason, Sturgis, Tilden, and Tuckerman. Of his eleven offspring, Samuel chose George as the one to administer the Parkman estate.

== Early life ==
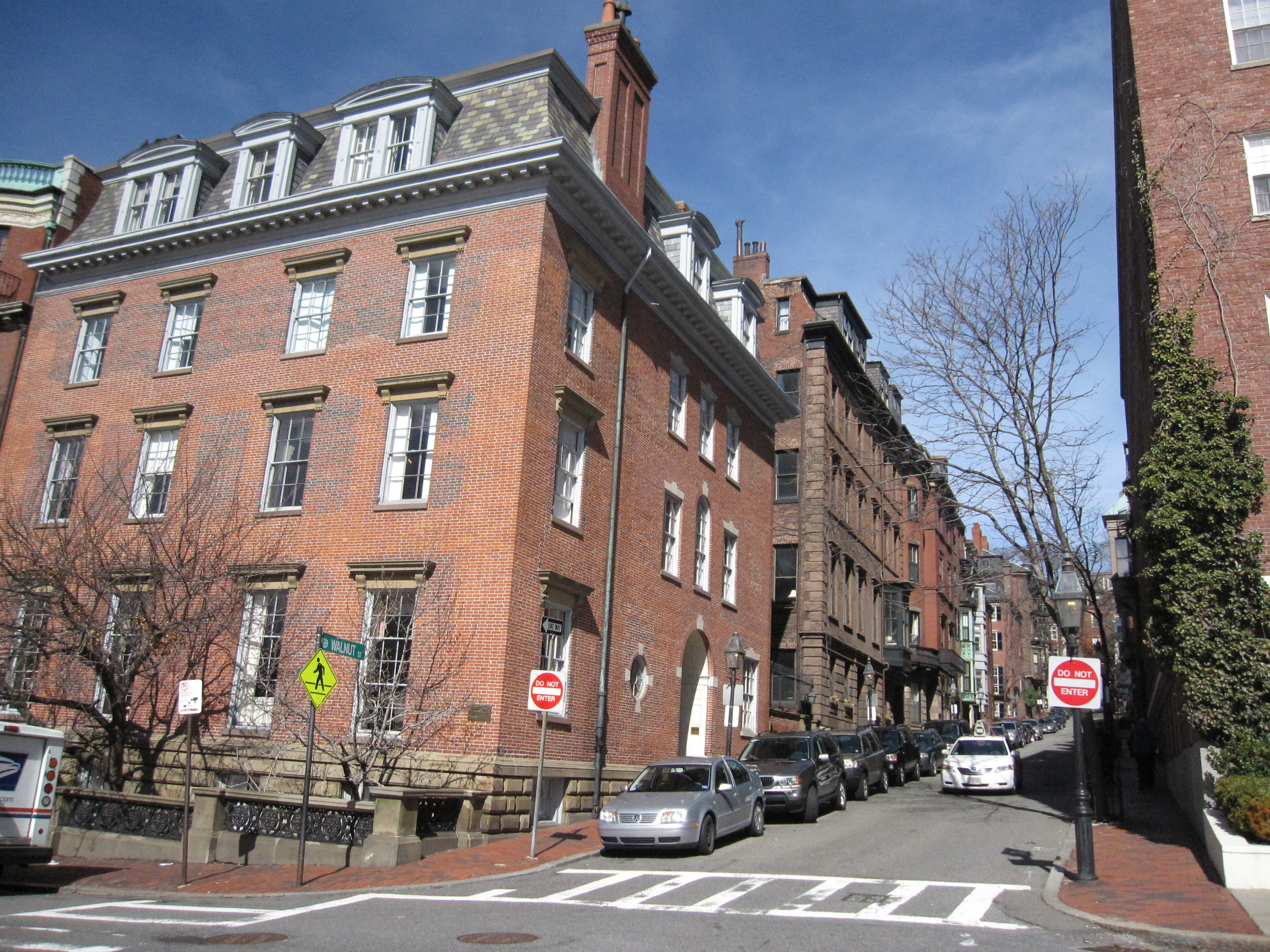
Walnut Street, Beacon Hill, Boston, where George Parkman lived

George Parkman's poor health as a youngster led him to want to study medicine. He entered the freshman class of Harvard University when he was 15 years old, and delivered the "Salutory Oration" in 1809. Despite his assured wealth, a lecture by Benjamin Rush inspired him to take an interest in the terrible state of asylums for the mentally ill. He spent two years at the University of Aberdeen in Scotland obtaining his medical degree. After returning to Boston, he traveled aboard the USS Constitution to Europe and was under the charge of a former Bostonian, Benjamin Thompson, who introduced him to the Minister to France, Joel Barlow. Barlow introduced him to many doctors in Paris. While there, he observed the pioneering and humane treatment methods of two famous French psychiatrists, Philippe Pinel and Étienne Esquirol. He studied at the Pitié-Salpêtrière Hospital for his graduate work. "My first knowledge of the Salpêtrière, was with the high privilege of the guidance of its great physician, Pinel, and of his new illustrious associate, Esquirol. Pinel received me kindly, and inquired with much interest after Benjamin Rush, who had lately written his book on Diseases of the Mind," Parkman wrote from Paris. That same interest helped to cement the relationship between Parkman and Pinel. The 70-year-old Pinel's ideas impressed Parkman. Under teachers like Pinel and Esquirol, Parkman practiced at the Parisian Asylum, and learned the history and treatment of mental "diseases." At this time Parkman developed his own path of his career. He spent time in England as well, studying with men of science.

Parkman returned to the U.S. in 1813. The War of 1812 called for the service of young men and Parkman “received a commission as a surgeon in a regiment of the third brigade belonging to the first division of the Massachusetts militia.” He began in South Boston and simultaneously served as a physician to the poor with a desire to replicate the practices of Pinel and Esquirol.

Parkman believed that psychiatric institutions should reflect a residence-like setting, where patients could enjoy hobbies and socializing and participating in household chores, as permitted. Parkman thought Pitié-Salpêtrière Hospital was a good model and talked to the faculty of Massachusetts General Hospital about having a lunatic hospital connected to it. In 1817, he wrote two papers, Remarks on Insanity and The Management of Lunatics in an effort to convince the trustees of the Massachusetts General Hospital that he could supervise an asylum they were considering opening. That same year he offered to raise $16,000 for the construction of a full-size institution. Unfortunately, the trustees interpreted the offer as a proposal to fully endow the project. Later, the McLean Asylum for the Insane was established, but the trustees feared the taint of corruption if Parkman had held an appointment he had endowed. Rufus Wyman, the father of Jeffries Wyman and Morrill Wyman, who both were involved in the Parkman–Webster murder case, was appointed. Parkman retired, but continued his interest in medicine and insanity. He would visit and entertain them, he bought them an organ, and opened up his own mansions during cholera and smallpox epidemics for the treatment of patients.

== Later life ==
Parkman was involved with the organization and publication of The New England Journal of Medicine and Surgery with John Collins Warren and John Ware in 1823. When his father died in 1824, George took complete control of the family estate and bought vast amounts of land and real estate in Boston, including many poorly maintained tenements. Money lending and real estate augmented his income; he also sold the land for the new Harvard Medical School and the Charles Street Jail.

In 1837 he revisited Pitié-Salpêtrière Hospital, and he sent a letter and some sketches to the Boston Medical and Surgical Journal, describing some Parisian hospitals.

Parkman was a well-known figure in the streets of Boston, which he walked daily, collecting his rents (a thrifty man, he did not own a horse). He was tall and lean, had a protruding chin, and wore a top hat. Oliver Wendell Holmes, Sr. said that "he abstained while others indulged, he walked while others rode, he worked while others slept." Frances "Fanny" Elizabeth Appleton Longfellow (1817 – 1861), wife of the poet Henry Wadsworth Longfellow (1807 – 1882), called him "the lean doctor... the good-natured Don-Quixote." Richard Henry Dana Jr. recalled him as a

"physician of wealth and high social position, well known in the city as the owner of many small tenements, and of whom hard things had been said as to his strictness in collecting what he thought his dues. Be that as it may, my memory associates him only with ready and active beneficence. His name has since been known the civilized world over, from his having been the victim of one of the most painful tragedies in the records of the criminal law."

He was reported to have a net worth of $500,000 in 1846, roughly $12,500,000 in 2012 money.

== Death ==
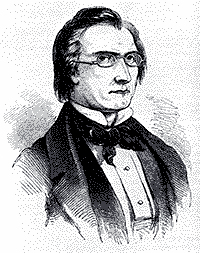
Webster during his trial in 1850

Parkman was murdered on Friday, November 23, 1849. After an extensive search by Derastus Clapp and other police officers from Francis Tukey's newly formed Boston police force, Parkman's dismembered and partly burned body was discovered on November 30 by Ephraim Littlefield, a janitor at Harvard Medical School. Parkman's funeral was held on December 6, an event for which thousands of people lined the streets of Boston. John White Webster (May 20, 1793 – August 30, 1850), a professor of chemistry and geology at Harvard Medical School, was convicted of killing Parkman in a sensational trial.

== Legacy ==
The murder of George Parkman, and the subsequent publicity surrounding Webster's trial and eventual execution was deeply disturbing to Parkman's widow and children. They became virtual recluses in their home at 33 Beacon Street, and neither of Parkman's two children (George Francis and Harriet) ever married. When their mother died in 1877, they inherited the entire estate. After his sister Harriet's death in 1885, George Francis remained the sole heir to this considerable fortune. At the time of George Francis' death on September 16, 1908, the estate was valued at nearly $5.5 million. Nearly all of this estate was left to the City of Boston, one of the largest bequests ever made to it. George Parkman's house still stands at 8 Walnut Street in Beacon Hill.

== Works ==
- Insanity (Boston, 1818)
- Management of Lunatics, with Illustrations of Insanity (Boston, 1822)

== See also ==
- Francis Parkman — nephew.

== Notes ==
=== References ===
- Bemis, George (1850). Report of the Case of John W. Webster. Boston: Charles C. Little and James Brown. p. 2. "George Bemis, Report of the Case of John W. Webster."
- Holmes, Oliver Wendell (1850). The Benefactors of the Harvard Medical School: with a Biographical Sketch of the Late Dr. George Parkman. Boston: Ticknor, Reed, and Fields.
- Dictionary of American Biography, vol. 19, pp. 592–3. New York, Charles Scribner's Sons, 1936.
- Jim Fisher, "The Webster-Parkman Case"
- D. W. Harrison, 1971, Library Journal, August, 96:2533
- Kathleen Halttunen, "Divine Providence and Dr. Parkman's Jawbone: The Cultural Construction of Murder as Mystery", National Humanities Council.
- King, Vandall T., 2006, Mineralogy and Chemistry at Harvard 1800-1865: In Search of John White Webster - an Innocent Man, Journal of the Geoliterary Society, volume 21 (#2): pp. 5–24
- Craig Lambert, "An Aristocrat's Killing", Harvard Magazine, July–August 2003.
- Murder at Harvard, American Experience, PBS documentary - WGBH.
- Edward C. Papenfuse, 2001, "Was Simon Schama Fair to the Facts of the John White Webster Case?", Maryland State Archives.
- Beth Potier, "Murder at Harvard", Harvard Gazette, 3 October 2002.
- Professor's Murder Trial Begins, Mass Moments Website
- Katherine Ramsland, "All about George Parkman", Crime Library.
- Simon Schama, 1991, Dead Certainties: Unwarranted Speculations, Alfred A. Knopf, New York, p. 333.
- James W. Stone, The Trial of Prof. John White Webster. Boston: Phillip Sampson & Co, 1850.
- Robert Sullivan, The Disappearance of Dr. Parkman. Boston: Little, Brown and Company, 1971.
- Thomson, Helen, 1971, Murder at Harvard, Houghton Mifflin, Boston, p. 318.
- Webster, John W. and The Boston Journal, The Trial of Prof. John W. Webster Indicted for the Murder of Dr. George Parkman, Boston: Redding & Company, 1850.
