= John White Webster =

American academic (1793–1850)

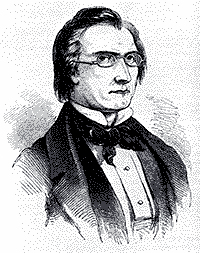
- John White Webster during his trial in 1850
- Born: May 20, 1793; Boston, Massachusetts, US
- Died: August 30, 1850 (aged 57); Leverett Street Jail, Massachusetts, US
- Occupation: Lecturer
- Spouse: Harriet Fredrica Hickling
- Status: Executed by hanging
- Conviction: Murder
- Penalty: Death

John White Webster (May 20, 1793 – August 30, 1850) was an American professor of chemistry and geology at Harvard Medical College. In 1850, he was convicted of murder in the Parkman–Webster murder case and hanged.

== Biography ==
Born in Boston, Massachusetts, Webster was well-connected both by family and by profession: his grandfather was a successful merchant; his mother, Hannah (White) Webster, was a Leverett, a member of one of the great Harvard College dynasties, and a descendant of John Leverett, an early governor of the Massachusetts Bay Colony; his wife's sister married into the Prescotts, descendants of William Prescott, who commanded patriot troops at the Battle of Bunker Hill, and after whom the town of Prescott was named. He was friends with Robert Gould Shaw, and his Unitarian pastor was the Reverend Francis Parkman Sr. (brother of George). These connections ensured that he moved securely within a socially-connected, exclusive, educated, and privileged circle of society.

He graduated from Harvard College in 1811. In 1814, he was among the founders of the Linnaean Society of New England, and was appointed cabinet-keeper of the society's quickly growing collection of specimens in Joy's Buildings in Boston.

Around 1815, he went to London for further study. At Guy's Hospital, he was a surgeon's pupil, a physician's pupil, and a surgeon's dresser. He then went to São Miguel Island in the Azores (1817–1818). There, he practiced medicine; published his first book; and met the daughter of Thomas Hickling, the American vice-consul on the island. Thomas Hickling was also a wealthy merchant who traded in wine and oranges. Vice Consul Hickling's family enjoyed a luxurious lifestyle. Harriet Fredrica Hickling married Webster on May 16, 1818, and they had four daughters. After returning to Boston, he entered private medical practice, but a lack of success prompted him to change careers. Webster was elected a Fellow of the American Academy of Arts and Sciences, in 1823.

=== Harvard lecturer ===
In 1824, Webster was appointed a lecturer of chemistry, mineralogy, and geology at the Harvard Medical College, and three years later he was promoted to the Erving professorship. In Boston he lived on Common Street.

Webster was a popular lecturer at Harvard Medical College, being described by Oliver Wendell Holmes Sr. as "pleasant in the lecture room, rather nervous and excitable." Many of Webster's class-room demonstrations involved some of the latest chemical discoveries. Cohen (1950) particularly noted Webster's demonstrating Michael Faraday's liquefaction of the common gasses and Webster even made solid carbon dioxide among his demonstrations. Edward Everett Hale reminisced about the student-based Davy Club at Harvard: "Dr. Webster... gave us the most good-natured and kindly assistance." George F. Hoar mentioned that Webster's lectures were "tedious", at least for a non-chemistry major, but that: "[Webster] was known to the students by the sobriquet of Sky-rocket jack, owing to his great interest in having some fireworks at the illumination when President Everett, his former classmate, was inaugurated. There was no person less likely to commit such a bloody and cruel crime as that for which he was accused." Many anecdotes suggest his class-room demonstrations were livened by pyrotechnic drama, although on one occasion the President of Harvard warned that some of them were dangerous if an accident occurred.

Henry Wadsworth Longfellow attested to his macabre streak in an anecdote relating how at one dinner at the Webster home, the host amazed his guests by lowering the lights, fitting a noose around his own neck, and lolling his head forward, tongue protruding, over a bowl of blazing chemicals, to give a ghastly imitation of a man being hanged.

He wrote A Description of the Island of St. Michael (1821), was associate editor of the Boston Journal of Philosophy and the Arts (1824–26), compiled A Manual of Chemistry (1826), and brought out editions of Andrew Fyfe's Elements of Chemistry (1827) and Justus von Liebig's Animal Chemistry or Organic Chemistry (1841). Noted mineralogist and Harvard Professor, Clifford Frondel appraised Webster's books as "creditable" and had praise for them.

=== Parkman–Webster murder case ===
On November 23, 1849, Dr. George Parkman was murdered. After an investigation, John White Webster was accused of the murder on January 26, 1850. The murder trial was the 19th century equivalent of the "Case of the Century" and has been widely cited as one of the earliest uses of forensic evidence to identify a body. As the remains had been partially cremated, dental evidence and bone fragments were used to verify that they were Dr. Parkman's. The case was widely publicized in newspapers, particularly as Webster was also a professor at Harvard University. Webster was known to be in debt to Parkman and there had been arguments when Parkman pressed Webster for money.

After a lengthy trial, where, under current Massachusetts law, Webster could not testify in his own defense, the jury was instructed by the principal judge, a close relative of the victim, that they "Must come back with a guilty verdict." The judge also issued one of the first ever “reasonable doubt” instructions to the jury, however. The most important factor about the case is that a great body of documentary testimony was either not used by Webster's lawyers or was denied admission into his defense. Helen Thomson wrote utilizing mostly the extensively re-written court testimony and newspaper accounts. Her book partially perpetuated the notion that Webster was guilty, although, she too had reservations about the testimony and verdict. Robert Sullivan, the chief criminal prosecutor for the State of Massachusetts, reviewed the entire documentary records of the Webster case and was convinced that Webster was innocent and that the murderer was actually Webster's accuser, Ephraim Littlefield: "The verdict not only was unwarranted, but appears to have been unduly guided by the judge's charge to the jury."

Webster was sentenced to death, taken to Boston's Leverett Street Jail on August 30, 1850, and publicly hanged.

== In popular culture ==
The Parkman–Webster murder case was dramatized in the CBS radio program Crime Classics on July 13, 1953, in the episode entitled "The Terrible Deed of John White Webster". Webster was portrayed in this program by Jay Novello. The case was also discussed at length in the first episode of television programme Catching History's Criminals: The Forensics Story, focussing on identity. The series was produced by the BBC and the Open University in 2015. The case was also the subject of one of the 'Famous Trials' series of books edited by George Dilnot (qv) and published in England by Geoffrey Bles in 1928.
