= List of Harvard Medical School alumni =

Harvard Medical School is the medical school of Harvard University and is located in the Longwood Medical Area in Boston, Massachusetts.

== Academia ==
=== Founders ===
- Lewis Hackett, 1913, founder of the School of Malariology in Nettuno, Italy and first editor of the American Journal of Tropical Medicine and Hygiene
- Nathan Smith, 1811, co-founded Dartmouth Medical School, the University of Vermont College of Medicine, the Medical School of Maine, and the Yale School of Medicine

=== Chancellors and university presidents ===
- Aram Chobanian, president of Boston University
- John Call Dalton, president of Columbia University College of Physicians and Surgeons
- William Henry Danforth, chancellor of Washington University in St. Louis
- David W. Fraser, 1969, president of Swarthmore College
- Paula Johnson, 1985, president of Wellesley College
- Nancy Ip, 1983, president of the Hong Kong University of Science and Technology
- Jim Yong Kim, 1991, president of Dartmouth College and president of the World Bank
- Anthony Monaco, 1987, 13th president of Tufts University
- Joseph E. Nyre, president of Seton Hall University and Iona College
- Chase N. Peterson, president of the University of Utah
- Calvin Plimpton, president of Amherst College and American University of Beirut
- Daniel K. Podolsky, 1978, president of the University of Texas Southwestern Medical Center
- Valerie Montgomery Rice, 1987, president and dean of Morehouse School of Medicine
- Judith A. Salerno, 1985, president of the New York Academy of Medicine
- Jay P. Sanford, president of the Uniformed Services University of the Health Sciences
- Samuel L. Stanley, 1980, president of Stony Brook University
- M. Roy Wilson, 1980, president of Wayne State University

=== Provosts and vice chancellors ===
- Ezekiel Emanuel, 1988, vice provost for global Initiatives and chair of the Department of Medical Ethics and Health Policy at the University of Pennsylvania
- Harvey V. Fineberg, 1971, dean of the Harvard School of Public Health and provost of Harvard University
- Melissa L. Gilliam, provost of Ohio State University and the incoming president of Boston University
- Gerald T. Keusch, 1963, associate provost for global health at Boston University Medical Campus
- Daniel H. Lowenstein, 1983, executive vice chancellor and provost at the University of California, San Francisco
- Alexander Margulis, 1950, associate chancellor and chairman of radiology at University of California, San Francisco and professor of radiology at Weill Cornell Medical College
- John Long Wilson, 1939, administrator at the American University of Beirut and acting vice president and dean of the Stanford University School of Medical

=== Deans ===
- James B. Aguayo-Martel, associate dean of graduate medical education in California Northstate University College of Medicine, chair of surgery at the Mercy San Juan Medical Center, assistant professor at Johns Hopkins Medical School and Wilmer Ophthalmological Institute
- Nancy Andrews, 1987, dean of the Duke University School of Medicine and biologist and physician noted for her research on iron homeostasis
- R. Palmer Beasley, 1962, dean of the University of Texas Health Science Center at Houston School of Public Health
- Francis Gilman Blake, 1913, immunologist and dean of the Yale University School of Medicine
- Henry Pickering Bowditch, 1868, dean of the Harvard Medical School
- Steven J. Burakoff, dean for cancer Innovation and chief of pediatric oncology at the Icahn School of Medicine and professor of cancer medicine at Mount Sinai Medical Center
- Martin D. Burke, 2005, associate dean of research in the Carle Illinois College of Medicine and professor for chemical innovation at the University of Illinois at Urbana–Champaign
- George Q. Daley, 1991, dean of the Faculty of Medicine and professor of biological chemistry and molecular pharmacology at Harvard Medical School
- Leo M. Davidoff, associate dean and chairman of the departments of surgery and neurological surgery at the Albert Einstein College of Medicine
- Benjamin L. Ebert, 1999, chair of medical oncology at the Dana–Farber Cancer Institute
- Daniel Federman, 1953, endocrinologist and dean for medical education at Harvard Medical School
- Henri Ford, 1984, dean of the Miller School of Medicine at the University of Miami and chief of surgery at Children's Hospital Los Angeles
- Phyllis Gardner, 1976, dean of education and professor of medicine at the Stanford University School of Medicine
- Richard Gorlin, 1948, dean for clinical affairs and chair of the Samuel Bronfman Department of Medicine at Mount Sinai School of Medicine
- Howard Hiatt, 1948, dean of the Harvard School of Public Health
- Edward M. Hundert, 1984, dean for medical education at Harvard Medical School
- Anya Hurlbert, 1990, professor of visual neuroscience and dean of advancement at Newcastle University
- J. B. S. Jackson, 1829, dean of Harvard Medical School and first curator of the Warren Anatomical Museum
- Ashish Jha, 1997, White House COVID-19 response coordinator and dean of the Brown University School of Public Health
- Clay Johnston, dean of the Dell Medical School at University of Texas at Austin
- Rainu Kaushal, senior associate dean of clinical research and chair of the Department of Population Health Sciences at Weill Cornell Medicine
- Mark G. Lebwohl, 1978, chairman emeritus of the department of dermatology and the dean for clinical therapeutics at the Icahn School of Medicine at Mount Sinai
- Seeley G. Mudd, 1924, professor and dean at the Keck School of Medicine of the University of Southern California
- Richard S. Ross, 1947 dean of the Johns Hopkins School of Medicine
- Mark Schuster, 1987, dean and founding CEO of the Kaiser Permanente Bernard J. Tyson School of Medicine
- Nathan R. Selden, 1993, dean of the School of Medicine and executive vice president, Oregon Health & Science University
- Lewis Thomas, dean of Yale Medical School and New York University School of Medicine, essayist, poet, and winner of the National Book Awards in two categories
- Carl F. Nathan, 1972, dean of the Weill Graduate School of Medical Sciences at Cornell University and chair of the department of microbiology and immunology at Weill Cornell Medicine
- Thomas D. Pollard, 1968, professor of cell biology and molecular biophysics and biochemistry at Yale University and dean of Yale's Graduate School of Arts and Sciences
- Deborah Prothrow-Stith, 1979, physician; dean and professor at Charles R. Drew University College of Medicine
- Carmen Puliafito, 1978, ophthalmologist and dean of the Keck School of Medicine of USC
- Dominick P. Purpura, dean of Albert Einstein College of Medicine of Yeshiva University
- Farrokh Saidi, 1954, dean of Medical School, Pahlavi University School of Medicine and under-secretary for Medical Education and Health Services of Iran
- Alfred Sommer, 1967, dean of the Johns Hopkins Bloomberg School of Public Health
- Lamar Soutter, dean of the University of Massachusetts Medical School
- David Humphreys Storer, dean of the faculty of Medicine at Harvard Medical School and naturalist
- Isaac M. Taylor, dean of the Medical School of the University of North Carolina

=== Department chairs ===
- Kamal Badr, professor of medicine and chair of the Department of Internal Medicine at the American University of Beirut
- Ben Barres, 1990, chair of the Neurobiology Department at Stanford University School of Medicine
- Earl P. Benditt, 1941, pathologist and chair of the Department of Pathology at the University of Washington
- Robert M. Berne, 1943, textbook author, journal editor, and chair and the founder of cardiovascular research at the University of Virginia
- Azad Bonni, 1996, professor of neuroscience and chair of the Department of Neuroscience at Washington University in St. Louis
- Nancy J. Brown, 1981, chair and physician-in-chief of the Department of Medicine at Vanderbilt University School of Medicine
- Reinhard Busse, head of the Department of Healthcare Management at the Faculty of Economics and Management at Technische Universität Berlin
- Walter Bradford Cannon, 1900, professor and chairman of the Department of Physiology at Harvard Medical School who coined the term fight or flight response
- Dennis Choi, 1978, chair of the department of neurology at Renaissance School of Medicine at Stony Brook University as well as director of the Neurosciences Institute
- David Glendenning Cogan, 1930, chair of Harvard Medical School's ophthalmology department and chief of neuro-ophthalmology at the NIH's National Eye Institute
- Albert Coons, 1937, chair of the Department of Bacteriology and Immunology and Department of Pathology at Harvard Medical School
- John W. Crawford, professor and chair of the Department of Biochemistry at the Chicago Medical School and of the Department of Physiology and Biophysics at Rutgers Medical School
- Vincent Cryns, 1987, chair of the Division of Endocrinology, Diabetes, and Metabolism at the University of Wisconsin School of Medicine and Public Health
- Jayanta Debnath, 1998, chair of the University of California, San Francisco department of pathology
- Paul Farmer, 1990, chair of the Department of Global Health and Social Medicine at Harvard Medical School
- Don W. Fawcett, 1938, pioneer of electron microscopy and chair of the Department of Anatomy at Cornell Medical School
- Josef E. Fischer, professor and chairman of the Department of Surgery at University of Cincinnati College of Medicine
- Thomas B. Fitzpatrick, chair of the Department of Dermatology at Harvard Medical School
- Stephen J. Galli, 1973, chair of the pathology department and as a professor of pathology, microbiology, and immunology at Stanford University School of Medicine
- William Francis Ganong Jr., chairman of the physiology department at the University of California, San Francisco
- Sid Gilman, chair in research neurology at Columbia University and chair and chief of service of neurology at the University of Michigan Medical School
- Melvin J. Glimcher, chair in orthopedic surgery at Harvard Medical School
- Julia Haller, professor and chair of the Department of Ophthalmology at Sidney Kimmel Medical College at Thomas Jefferson University
- Eve Higginbotham, 1979, chair of the ophthalmology department at the University of Maryland School of Medicine
- Gökhan S. Hotamisligil, 1994, chair of genetics and metabolism at Harvard T.H. Chan School of Public Health
- Renee Hsia, associate chair of health services research at the University of California, San Francisco
- Charles A. Hufnagel, surgeon who invented the first artificial heart valve and chairman of the department of surgery at Georgetown University
- Reshma Jagsi, chair in the department of radiation oncology at Emory University
- T.R. Johns, clinical researcher on myasthenia gravis and founding chair of the Department of Neurology at the University of Virginia
- Samuel Katz, professor and chairman of pediatrics at Duke University
- Dimitri Krainc, chairman of the Ken & Ruth Davee Department of Neurology at Northwestern University Feinberg School of Medicine
- Gustaf Lindskog, 1928, chair of surgery at the Yale School of Medicine, best known for having participated in the first pharmaceutical treatment of cancer
- Irving London, founding chair of the department of medicine at the Albert Einstein College of Medicine
- John E. Mack, 1955, head of the department of psychiatry at Harvard Medical School who won the Pulitzer Prize for his book A Prince of Our Disorder on T. E. Lawrence
- Robert McCarley, 1964, chair and professor of psychiatry at Harvard Medical School
- John S. Meyer, chairman of Neurology at Wayne State University School of Medicine and Baylor College of Medicine
- Mark Moss, professor and chair of anatomy and neurobiology at the Boston University School of Medicine
- Stuart Mudd, 1920, head of the department of microbiology at the University of Pennsylvania Medical School
- John McLean Morris, 1940, chief of gynecology and professor at Yale-New Haven Medical Center and Yale School of Medicine
- Christopher J. L. Murray, chair of Health Metrics Science at the University of Washington in Seattle and the director of the Institute for Health Metrics and Evaluation
- Kari Nadeau, 1995, chair of the Department of Environmental Health at Harvard School of Public Health
- Walter Nance, professor and chair of the department of human genetics of the Virginia Commonwealth University
- Robert E. Olson, 1951, chair of the Department of Biochemistry and Nutrition University of Pittsburgh and chair of the Biochemistry Department at St. Louis University
- Hildrus Poindexter, 1929, bacteriologist, professor and chair of the Department of Bacteriology, Preventive Medicine and Public Health at Howard University
- Hiram Polk, professor and chairman of surgery at the University of Louisville
- Bonnie Ramsey, 1976, chair in Cystic Fibrosis at the University of Washington School of Medicine
- Frederic M. Richards, 1952, founder and chair of the Department of Molecular Biophysics and Biochemistry at Yale University
- Oswald Hope Robertson, non-degreed, head of the Department of Medicine at the University of Chicago who pioneered the idea of blood banks
- Eli Robins, head of the psychiatric department at Washington University in St. Louis
- Nadia Rosenthal, chair in Cardiovascular Science at Imperial College London and founding director of the Australian Regenerative Medicine Institute
- George E. Shambaugh Jr., 1928, chairman of the department of otolaryngology at Northwestern University
- Arlene Sharpe, chair of the Department of Immunology at Harvard Medical School
- Andrew E. Sloan, chair of neurosurgical oncology at Case Western Reserve University
- Jerome T. Syverton, 1931, head of the department of microbiology at the Louisiana State University School of Medicine and the department of bacteriology at the University of Minnesota
- Carl E. Taylor, founding chair of the Department of International Health at the Johns Hopkins Bloomberg School of Public Health
- Ernest Tyzzer, head of the Department of Comparative Pathology at Harvard Medical School
- Elliot Vesell, founding chair of the Department of Pharmacology at Pennsylvania State University
- Herbert W. Virgin, professor and chair of the Department of Pathology and Immunology at the Washington University School of Medicine
- William T. Wickner, 1973, chair of the biochemistry department at Dartmouth Medical School and faculty at University of California, Los Angeles
- Ira Wilson, 1987, professor and chair of health Services, policy and practice at the Brown University School of Public Health
- Terri Young, 1986, chair of the Department of Ophthalmology and Visual Sciences at the University of Wisconsin School of Medicine and Public Health

=== Program directors ===
- Larry J. Anderson, virologist with the Centers for Disease Control and Prevention and professor and co-director of the Pediatric Infectious Diseases Division of the Emory University School of Medicine
- Nikola Biller-Andorno, bioethicist and professor and director of the Institute of Biomedical Ethics of the University of Zurich
- Ira Black, 1965, neuroscientist and stem cell researcher, first director of the Stem Cell Institute of New Jersey at Robert Wood Johnson Medical School
- David O. Carpenter, 1964, professor of environmental health sciences at the University at Albany, SUNY and director of its Institute for Health and the Environment
- Rita Charon, 1978, founder and executive director of the Program in Narrative medicine at Columbia University
- Eliza Lo Chin, 1993, assistant clinical professor of medicine at the University of California, San Francisco and the executive director of the American Medical Women's Association
- Eric Chivian, 1968, founder and director of the Center for Health and the Global Environment (CHGE) at Harvard Medical School
- F. Curtis Dohan Jr., 1961, director of neuropathology at the University of Tennessee, College of Medicine
- Elliott S. Fisher, 1981, health policy researcher and director of The Dartmouth Institute for Health Policy and Clinical Practice
- Amita Gupta, 1997, director of the Division of Infectious Diseases at Johns Hopkins University
- Ronald Heifetz, senior lecturer in public leadership and founding director of the Center for Public Leadership at Harvard Kennedy School at Harvard University
- Steven Hyman, director of the Stanley Center for Psychiatric Research at the Broad Institute of Massachusetts Institute of Technology and Harvard University
- James Kirklin, director of the Institute for Research in Surgical Outcomes and co-director of the comprehensive cardiovascular center at the University of Alabama at Birmingham
- Brigid Leventhal, 1960, first director of the Pediatric Oncology Division at Johns Hopkins University
- Barbara Joyce McNeil, 1966, founding director of the department of health care policy at Harvard Medical School
- Gil Omenn, 1965, director of the Center for Computational Medicine and Bioinformatics at the University of Michigan
- E. Converse Peirce II, 1943, professor and director of hyperbaric medicine at the Mount Sinai School of Medicine
- Thomas A. Rando, 1987, director of the Eli and Edythe Broad Center of Regenerative Medicine and Stem Cell Research; professor of Neurology and Molecular, Cell and Developmental Biology at the University of California, Los Angeles
- Howard Rasmussen, 1952, founder and director of the Institute of Molecular Medicine and Genetics at the Medical College of Georgia
- David Rutstein, 1934, professor and head of the department of preventive medicine at Harvard Medical School
- Ram Sasisekharan, bioengineer, professor, and director of the Harvard–MIT Program in Health Sciences and Technology
- Carla J. Shatz, 1976, head of the Department of Neurobiology at Harvard Medical School
- Daniel K. Sodickson, 2006, vice-chair for Research in the Department of Radiology at New York University (NYU) Grossman School of Medicine
- Edmund Sonnenblick, 1958, inaugural director of the Cardiology Division at the Albert Einstein College of Medicine
- Felicia Stewart, director and professor at the Center for Reproductive Health Research and Policy at the University of California, San Francisco
- Siobhan Wescott, director of the Indians into Medicine program at the University of North Dakota

=== Professors ===
- John R. Adler, 1980, neurosurgeon and professor of Stanford University School of Medicine
- Macrene Alexiades, associate clinical professor of Dermatology at Yale School of Medicine
- Joseph Alpert, cardiologist and professor of medicine at the University of Arizona Sarver Heart Center
- Robert Amory, physician, professor at Harvard Medical School and Bowdoin College Medical School, and Massachusetts medical examiner
- Harold Amos, microbiologist and professor at Harvard Medical School
- James M. Anderson, 1983, professor at the Yale School of Medicine
- Louise Aronson, 1992, geriatrician, writer, and professor of medicine at the University of California, San Francisco
- Constantino Méndieta, 1998, surgeon, physician and professor at Harvard Medical School
- Karen Ashe, 1982, professor at the Department of Neurology and Neuroscience at the University of Minnesota (UMN) Medical School
- Kimball Atwood, assistant clinical professor at Tufts University School of Medicine
- Joseph Charles Aub, endocrinologist and professor and chair of medicine at Harvard University
- Jerry Avorn, 1974, professor of medicine at Harvard Medical School
- Vadim Backman, professor of biomedical engineering at the Robert R. McCormick School of Engineering and Applied Science at Northwestern University
- Marshall A. Barber, physician who studied malaria, affiliated with the Rockefeller Foundation and the University of Kansas
- Abraham Clifford Barger, 1943, professor of physiology at Harvard Medical School
- Dan Barouch, 1999, professor of medicine and professor of immunology at Harvard Medical School
- Robert C. Bast Jr., vice president for translational research at the University of Texas M.D. Anderson Cancer Center, best known for the discovery of CA125
- John Putnam Batchelder, professor of anatomy in Castleton State College, Vermont and professor of surgical anatomy in the Berkshire Medical Institution
- Don Beaven, professor and researcher at the Christchurch School of Medicine
- Jon Beckwith, microbiologist, geneticist, and professor in the Department of Microbiology and Immunobiology at Harvard Medical School
- Henry K. Beecher, 1932, pioneering anesthesiologist, medical ethicist, and investigator of the placebo effect at Harvard Medical School
- Beryl Benacerraf, 1976, radiologist, professor at Harvard Medical School, and pioneer in the use of prenatal ultrasound to diagnose fetal abnormalities
- Herbert Benson, 1961, cardiologist and founding president of the Mind/Body Medical Institute of Harvard Medical School
- Sangeeta N. Bhatia, biological engineer and professor at the Massachusetts Institute of Technology
- Henry Jacob Bigelow, 1841, professor of surgery at Harvard University
- Brenda Bloodgood, neuroscientist and associate professor of neurobiology at the University of California, San Diego
- Stephen A. Boppart, 2000, bioengineer and principal investigator at the Beckman Institute for Advanced Science and Technology at the University of Illinois at Urbana-Champaign
- John Templeton Bowen, 1884, professor of dermatology at Massachusetts General Hospital
- Jonathan Braun, professor at the UCLA David Geffen School of Medicine
- George A. Bray, 1957, obesity researcher and professor emeritus with Louisiana State University
- Steven Brem, neurosurgeon at the Perelman School of Medicine at the University of Pennsylvania
- Jan Breslow, 1968, medical researcher who studies atherosclerosis and professor at Rockefeller University
- George Emerson Brewer, 1885, professor of Columbia University College of Physicians and Surgeons
- L.D. Britt, professor of surgery at the Eastern Virginia Medical School
- Emery N. Brown, 1987, professor of anesthesia at Harvard Medical School and at Massachusetts General Hospital
- James Howard Brown, 1917, professor of bacteriology at the Rockefeller Institute for Medical Research
- Austin M. Brues, 1930, pioneer of radiation biology, senior biologist at the Metallurgical Laboratory, and professor at University of Chicago
- John Buchanan, 1943, professor of biochemistry at the Massachusetts Institute of Technology
- Andrew E. Budson, 1993, professor of neurology at Boston University School of Medicine and chief of cognitive and behavioral research and chief of staff for education at the Veterans Affairs
- Donald Burke 1971, expert on infectious diseases of global concern and professor of health science and policy at the University of Pittsburgh
- John F. Burke, researcher and professor of surgery at Harvard University
- Laura M. Calvi, professor in endocrinology and metabolism at the University of Rochester
- Malcolm Casadaban, 1976, associate professor of molecular genetics, cell, biology, and microbiology at the University of Chicago
- Howard Y. Chang, professor of cancer genomics and genetics at Stanford University School of Medicine
- Cornelia Channing, 1965, professor of physiology at the University of Maryland School of Medicine who focused on endocrinology and fertility
- Christopher Chen, 1977 and 1999, professor of biomedical engineering at Boston University
- Sherry Chou, 2009, associate professor of neurology at the Northwestern University Feinberg School of Medicine
- Nicholas Christakis, sociologist and Sterling Professor of Social and Natural Science at Yale University
- Gilbert Chu, 1980, professor of oncology and biochemistry at the Stanford Medical School
- George Church, 1984, professor of genetics at Harvard Medical School; professor of health sciences and technology at Harvard University and Massachusetts Institute of Technology
- Alan D'Andrea, 1983, cancer researcher and professor of radiation oncology at Harvard Medical School
- Mayer B. Davidson, professor of medicine at Charles R. Drew University of Medicine and Science and the David Geffen School of Medicine at UCLA
- Bernard Davis, 1940, microbiologist at Harvard Medical School
- Philip L. De Jager, professor of neurology at Columbia University
- Arthur J. Deikman, clinical professor of psychiatry at the University of California, San Francisco
- Mahlon DeLong, 1966, neurologist and professor at the Medical School of Emory University
- John Holmes Dingle, founder and professor of the Department of Preventative Medicine at Western Reserve University
- Allison J. Doupe, pioneer in avian neurobiology and professor of psychiatry and physiology at the University of California, San Francisco
- John E. Dowling, research professor of neurosciences at Harvard University, known for his work in vision science
- Rachel Dutton, 2010, microbiologist and assistant professor in the division of biological sciences at the University of California, San Diego
- Thomas Dwight, 1867, professor of anatomy at Harvard Medical School and noted anatomist
- Elazer R. Edelman, professor in medical engineering at the Massachusetts Institute of Technology and professor of medicine at Harvard Medical School
- David Eidelberg, 1981, professor of neurology and molecular medicine at the Zucker School of Medicine
- David M. Eisenberg, alternative medicine researcher and associate professor of medicine at Harvard Medical School
- Shekinah Elmore, assistant professor in the department of radiation oncology at the University of North Carolina School of Medicine
- Jean Fan, biomedical engineer who teaches at Johns Hopkins University
- Ferric Fang, 1983, professor of Laboratory Medicine, pathology, and microbiology at the University of Washington School of Medicine
- Jawad Fares, senior researcher at the Lebanese University Neuroscience Research Center
- Douglas Farmer, 1942, professor of medicine at Boston University School of Medicine and Yale School of Medicine
- Reginald Heber Fitz, 1868, physician known for his research on abdominal disorders and professor at Harvard University
- Stephen Fleck, professor at the Yale University School of Medicine
- Judah Folkman, 1957, professor of pediatric surgery and cell biology at Harvard Medical School in 1968
- Alexander Forbes, 1910, electrophysiologist, neurophysiologist, and professor of physiology at Harvard Medical School
- Esther E. Freeman, assistant professor of dermatology at the Harvard Medical School
- John Farquhar Fulton, 1927, Sterling Professor of Physiology at Yale University who specialized in primate neurophysiology and history of science
- Joel Gelfand, dermatologist, epidemiologist, and professor at the University of Pennsylvania
- Norman Geschwind, 1951, pioneering behavioral neurologist and professor of neurology at Harvard University
- Mickey Goldberg, 1968, neuroscientist and professor at Columbia University
- Catherine M. Gordon, professor of paediatric medicine at the Baylor College of Medicine
- John Gorham, 1804, professor of chemistry and mineralogy at Harvard University
- Hermes Grillo, 1947, thoracic surgeon and professor of surgery at Harvard Medical School
- Lester Grinspoon, psychiatrist and associate professor of psychiatry at Harvard Medical School
- Roy Hamilton, 2001, professor of neurology, psychiatry, and physical medicine and rehabilitation at University of Pennsylvania
- Pehr Harbury, biochemist and associate professor of biochemistry at Stanford University
- Thaddeus William Harris, 1829, entomologist and librarian at Harvard University
- Stephen L. Hauser, professor of the department of neurology at the University of California, San Francisco
- Rebecca Heald, professor in the department of molecular and cell biology at the University of California, Berkeley
- Lawrence Joseph Henderson, 1902, one of the leading biochemists of the early 20th century and faculty of Harvard Medical School
- Judith Lewis Herman, professor of psychiatry at Harvard Medical School
- David Himmelstein, distinguished professor of public health and health policy in the CUNY School of Public Health
- William Augustus Hinton, 1912, first Black professor in the history of Harvard University
- Edward Hitchcock Jr., 1853, professor of hygiene and Physical Education at Amherst College
- Allan Hobson, 1959, professor of psychiatry at Harvard Medical School
- Myron Arms Hofer, 1858, professor in the department of psychiatry at Columbia University College of Physicians & Surgeons
- Worthington Hooker, 1829, professor of the theory and practice of medicine at Yale
- Charles Franklin Hoover, physician and professor of medicine
- Peter M. Howley, 1972, pathologist, virologist, and professor at Harvard Medical School
- A. James Hudspeth, 1974, professor at Rockefeller University
- Henry Hun, 1879, professor of Nervous Diseases at the Albany Medical College
- Anna Huttenlocher, cell biologist, physician-scientist, faculty at the University of Wisconsin–Madison
- Lisa Iezzoni, 1984, professor at Harvard Medical School
- Franz J. Ingelfinger, 1936, chief of gastroenterology at the Boston University School of Medicine and editor of The New England Journal of Medicine
- Henry Barton Jacobs, 1887, associate professor of medicine at Johns Hopkins University
- Charles Janeway, 1969, immunologist, professor, and founding members of the section of immunobiology at Yale University School of Medicine
- Alfred Jaretzki III, 1944, professor of clinical surgery at the Columbia University College of Physicians and Surgeons
- Mildred Fay Jefferson, 1951, professor of surgery at the Boston University School of Medicine
- William Jencks, 1951, biochemist and professor at Brandeis University
- Hershel Jick, 1956, professor of medicine at Boston University School of Medicine
- Eric A. Johnson, microbiologist and professor of bacteriology at the University of Wisconsin-Madison
- Kellie Ann Jurado, assistant professor of microbiology at the Perelman School of Medicine at the University of Pennsylvania
- Arnold Martin Katz, 1956, professor at the Mount Sinai School of Medicine and chief of cardiology at the University of Connecticut School of Medicine
- Jay Katz, 1949, Yale Law School professor specializing in medical ethics
- Julian Paul Keenan, professor of biology at Montclair State University
- Lawrence Kilham, 1940, professor at Dartmouth Medical School credited as the discoverer of K virus
- Elizabeth Klerman, 1990, professor of neurology at Harvard Medical School
- Samuel Kneeland, 1843, professor of zoology and physiology and corporate secretary of the Massachusetts Institute of Technology
- Richard Kogan, 1982, concert pianist and professor of psychiatry at Weill Cornell Medical Center
- Melvin Konner, 1985, professor of anthropology, neuroscience, and behavioral biology at Emory University
- Ronald Krauss, professor of pediatrics and medicine at the University of California, San Francisco
- Harlan Krumholz, 1985, cardiologist and professor of medicine at Yale School of Medicine
- Allison Kurian, professor of medicine and epidemiology and population health at Stanford University
- Daniel Kuritzkes, head of the clinical infectious disease division and professor of medicine at Harvard Medical School
- Cato T. Laurencin, University Professor of the University of Connecticut and founder of the field of regenerative engineering
- Lucian Leape, 1959, professor at Harvard School of Public Health
- Vivian Lee, executive fellow at Harvard Business School and senior lecturer at Harvard Medical School
- Samuel A. Levine, 1914, cardiologist and clinical professor of medicine at Harvard Medical School
- David C. Lewis, 1961, professor of medicine and community health at Brown University
- Matthew H. Liang, 1969, professor of medicine at Harvard Medical School
- Judy Lieberman, 1981, assistant professor of pediatrics at Harvard Medical School
- Michael Z. Lin, 2002, associate professor of neurobiology and bioengineering at Stanford University
- David J. L. Luck, 1953, cell biologist and professor at Rockefeller University
- Annie Luetkemeyer, 1999, professor of medicine and infectious diseases at the University of California, San Francisco
- Jeffrey Macklis, professor of life sciences at Harvard University and professor of neurology at Harvard Medical School
- Liza Makowski Hayes, professor at the University of Tennessee
- George Kenneth Mallory, 1926, pathologist and professor at Harvard Medical School and Boston Medical School
- Frank Burr Mallory, 1890, pathologist at the Boston City Hospital and professor of pathology at Harvard Medical School
- Emanual Maverakis, 2003, immunologist and professor at the University of California, Davis
- Hugh McDevitt, 1955, immunologist and professor of microbiology and immunology at Stanford University School of Medicine
- Michael T. McGuire, professor of psychiatry/biobehavioral sciences at the University of California at Los Angeles
- Paul R. McHugh, 1956, professor of psychiatry at the Johns Hopkins University School of Medicine
- Andrew W. Murray, professor of molecular genetics, Howard Hughes Medical Institute professor at Harvard University
- Megan B. Murray, professor of global health in the Department of Epidemiology at the Harvard T.H. Chan School of Public Health
- Jane Newburger, 1974, pediatrician, professor of pediatrics at Harvard Medical School
- Louis Harry Newburgh, 1908, physician and medical educator at the University of Michigan
- Sheila Nirenberg, neuroscientist and professor at Weill Cornell Medical College
- Stuart Orkin, 1972, professor of pediatrics at Harvard Medical School
- David C. Page, 1984, biologist and professor at the Massachusetts Institute of Technology
- Nigel Paneth, professor of epidemiology and biostatistics and pediatrics at Michigan State University
- Willard Parker, 1830, professor at the New York College of Physicians and Surgeons
- Francis Weld Peabody, 1907, professor at Harvard Medical School
- Maurice Pechet, 1948, professor and researcher at Harvard Medical School
- Neil R. Powe, professor of medicine at the University of California, San Francisco and Johns Hopkins University School of Medicine
- Kenneth Prager, 1968, professor of medicine at Columbia University Medical Center
- Dale Purves, 1964, research professor in the department of psychology and brain sciences at Duke University
- John Puskas, 1986, professor of Cardiovascular Surgery at the Icahn School of Medicine at Mount Sinai
- James Jackson Putnam, 1876, formed the Department of Neurology at Harvard Medical School
- Mitchell T. Rabkin, 1955, professor of medicine at Harvard Medical School
- Christian R. H. Raetz, 1973, professor of biochemistry at Duke University
- Jayaraj Rajagopal, professor of medicine at Harvard Medical School
- David Relman, 1982, microbiologist and professor at the Stanford University School of Medicine
- Birdsey Renshaw, 1936, electrophysiologist and neuroscientist at Rockefeller University
- Alexander H. Rice Jr., 1904, geographer and explorer noted for expeditions to the Amazon Basin, professor of geography at Harvard University
- Alexander Rich, 1949, biologist, biophysicist, and professor of Biophysics at Massachusetts Institute of Technology
- Maurice Howe Richardson, 1877, professor of surgery at Harvard Medical School
- Paul Ridker, 1986, cardiovascular epidemiologist and professor of medicine at Harvard University and Brigham and Women's Hospital
- Ellen Roche, biomedical engineer and Associate professor at the Massachusetts Institute of Technology
- Carolyn I. Rodriguez, associate professor and associate chair of Psychiatry and Behavioral Sciences at Stanford University
- Thomas Morgan Rotch, 1874, America's first full professor of pediatrics
- Marc E. Rothenberg, 1990, professor of pediatrics at Cincinnati Children's Hospital Medical Center and the University of Cincinnati College of Medicine
- David Rubin, 1974, professor of psychology at Duke University
- Emanuel Rubin, 1954, professor and chairman of pathology, anatomy and cell Biology at Jefferson Medical College
- Gary Ruvkun, molecular biologist at Massachusetts General Hospital and professor of genetics at Harvard Medical School
- Edward Thomas Ryan, professor of immunology and infectious diseases at the Harvard T.H. Chan School of Public Health and professor of medicine at Harvard Medical School
- Bernardo L. Sabatini, professor of neurobiology at Harvard Medical School
- Pardis Sabeti, 2006, professor in the Center for Systems Biology and Department of Organismic and Evolutionary Biology at Harvard University
- David B. Sachar, gastroenterologist and professor at Mount Sinai School of Medicine,
- Wolfram Saenger, biochemist and protein crystallographer at the Max Planck Institute for Experimental Medicine of Harvard Medical School
- Elizabeth Sattely, associate professor of chemical engineering in the Department of Chemical engineering at Stanford University
- Herbert Scheinberg, 1943, faculty member at Albert Einstein College of Medicine
- Steven A. Schroeder, 1964, Distinguished Professor of Health and Health Care at the University of California, San Francisco
- Theodore H. Schwartz, 1990, professor of neurosurgery, otolaryngology and neuroscience at Weill Cornell Medical College
- John J. Shea Jr., professor in the ear, nose, and throat departments of the University of Tennessee, the University of Mississippi, the University of North Carolina and Tulane University
- Jay Shendure, 2005 and 2007, professor in the Department of Genome Sciences at the University of Washington School of Medicine
- Gordon M. Shepherd, professor of neuroscience emeritus at the Yale School of Medicine
- Daniel J. Siegel, clinical professor of psychiatry at the UCLA School of Medicine
- Jordan Smoller, professor of psychiatry at Harvard Medical School and professor in the Department of Epidemiology at the Harvard School of Public Health
- Reisa Sperling, professor in neurology at Harvard Medical School
- Wesley W. Spink, 1932, professor at the University of Minnesota Medical School
- Timothy A. Springer, 1976, professor at Harvard Medical School
- David States, 1983, professor of Human Genetics at the University of Michigan
- John D. States, professor of Orthopedic Surgery at the University of Rochester
- Lincoln Stein, 1989, professor in bioinformatics and computational biology at the Ontario Institute for Cancer Research
- Lubert Stryer, professor of Cell Biology at Stanford University School of Medicine
- Collin M. Stultz, 1997, professor in medical engineering and science at the Massachusetts Institute of Technology
- Jason Swedlow, professor of quantitative cell biology at the School of Life Sciences, University of Dundee
- Susan C. Taylor, 1983, professor in the department of dermatology at the Perelman School of Medicine at the University of Pennsylvania
- Guillermo J. Tearney, 1998, professor of pathology at Harvard Medical School
- Abby Howe Turner, non-degreed, professor of physiology and zoology who founded the department of physiology at Mount Holyoke College
- Rudolph E. Tanzi, 1990, professor of Neurology at Harvard University
- Luk Van Parijs, 1997, associate professor of biology at the Massachusetts Institute of Technology
- Joseph Volpe, professor of neurology Harvard Medical School
- Howard Waitzkin, 1972, professor emeritus in the Department of Sociology at the University of New Mexico
- Robert Wallace Wilkins, 1933, faculty member and researcher at Boston University School of Medicine and Johns Hopkins University School of Medicine
- B. Timothy Walsh, professor of pediatric psychopharmacology in the Department of Psychiatry at Columbia University
- Carl W. Walter, 1932, professor at Harvard Medical School, pioneer in the transfusion and storage of blood
- John Ware, 1816, professor at Harvard College's Medical Department
- Benjamin Warf, 1984, professor of neurosurgery at Harvard Medical School
- John Warren, professor of anatomy at Harvard University
- John Collins Warren Jr., 1866, professor of surgery at Harvard Medical School
- Kenneth S. Warren, 1955, professor at Case Western Reserve University
- Amy Wax, 1981, professor of law at the University of Pennsylvania Law School
- Sherman Weissman, Sterling Professor of Genetics at the Yale School of Medicine
- Nanette Wenger, 1954, clinical cardiologist and professor emerita at Emory University School of Medicine
- James Clarke White, dermatologist, professor at Harvard Medical School, and first professor of dermatology in the U.S.
- James Clarke White, 1923, neurosurgeon, specialist in the surgical control of pain, and professor at Harvard Medical School
- Paul Dudley White, 1911, cardiologist and professor at Harvard Medical School
- John Clare Whitehorn, 1921, professor of psychiatry at Johns Hopkins University School of Medicine
- Janey L. Wiggs, professor of ophthalmology and vice chair for clinical research in ophthalmology at Harvard Medical School
- Burt Green Wilder, 1866, professor of neurology and vertebrate zoölogy at Cornell University
- Catherine Wilfert, 1958, professor at Duke University School of Medicine
- Carroll Williams, professor of biology at Harvard University
- Ellen Wright Clayton, professor of law and medicine and Vanderbilt University
- Ting Wu, 1984, professor of genetics at Harvard Medical School
- F. Eugene Yates, 1950, physiologist and professor of medicine and medical engineering at University of California Los Angeles
- King-Wai Yau, 1975, professor of neuroscience at Johns Hopkins University School of Medicine
- Junying Yuan, 1989, professor of cell biology at Harvard Medical School
- Paul Zamecnik, 1936, professor of oncologic medicine at Harvard Medical School
- Steven Zeisel, 1975, professor in nutrition and pediatrics at the University of North Carolina at Chapel Hill
- Kang Zhang, 1995, professor of medicine at Macau University of Science and Technology

== Art ==
- Andrea Ackerman, artist, theorist, and writer best known for her New Media artworks and taught 3D computer modeling (Maya) at Pratt Institute in Brooklyn
- Abraham Aronow, photographer best known for his monochrome portraits of prominent photographers
- William Sturgis Bigelow, 1874, prominent collector of Japanese art
- Eliot Porter, photographer best known for his color photographs of nature
- John Witt Randall, 1811, noted art collector and consulting zoologist to the United States Exploring Expedition

== Aviation and space ==
- Jonny Kim, 2016, naval aviator and NASA astronaut
- William Randolph Lovelace II, 1934, flight surgeon with the Army Medical Corps Reserve and chairman of the NASA Special Advisory Committee on Life Sciences
- Arthur J. Moss, 1957, Navy physician involved in the Holter monitoring and interpretations of the astronaut monkey, Miss Baker, and the first human astronaut
- Robert Satcher, 1994, NASA astronaut

== Business ==
- Isaac Adams Jr., inventor of the first commercially viable nickel plating process
- David Altshuler, executive vice president of Global Research and Chief Scientific Officer at Vertex Pharmaceuticals
- David Benaron, digital health entrepreneur
- David Berry, co-founder of Valo Health, Seres Therapeutics, Indigo Agriculture, and contributed to the early development of Moderna
- Paul M. Bingham, 1980, molecular biologist and vice president for Research at Rafael Pharmaceuticals
- Daniel DiLorenzo, entrepreneur and founder of NeuroVista Corporation
- Preston Estep, chief scientific officer and co-founder of Veritas Genetics
- John Freund, satirist, author, and co-founder of Intuitive Surgical and the co-founder and former CEO of Arixa Pharmaceuticals
- Richard Fuisz, physician, inventor, and entrepreneur
- Donald Ganem, global head of infectious disease research at Novartis Institutes for BioMedical Research
- Levi Garraway, senior vice president of global oncology at Eli Lilly and Company and chief medical officer of Roche Holding AG
- Roozbeh Ghaffari, 2008, CEO and co-founder of Epicore Biosystems
- Sekar Kathiresan, 1997, chief executive officer and co-founder of Verve Therapeutics
- Vikram Sheel Kumar, co-founder of Dimagi software company
- Andrew Le, co-founder of Buoy Health
- Dean Jewett Locke, non-degreed, businessman, rancher, and founder of Lockeford, California
- Randell Mills, scientist and founder of Brilliant Light Power
- Carl Marci, chief psychiatrist and managing director at OM1, a venture-backed health data company using artificial intelligence
- Vasant Narasimhan, chief executive officer of Novartis
- Jacqueline Nwando Olayiwola, senior vice president and chief health equity officer of Humana
- Anjana Rao, molecular biologist and co-founder of the company Calcimedica
- Edward Scolnick, 1965, head of research at Merck Research Laboratories
- Jonathan Stamler, founder of the Harrington Project and multiple biotechnology companies
- Samuel Strober, 1966, co-founder of a biotechnology company, Dendreon, that developed the first FDA approved cancer vaccination
- Daniel Voytas, chief scientific officer of Calyxt, an agricultural biotechnology company
- Christoph Westphal, founding CEO of Momenta Pharmaceuticals
- Richard Wurtman, 1960, researcher and co-founded Interneuron Pharmaceuticals and held the patent for dexfenfluramine

== Crime ==
- Charles Epstein, 1959, victim of a mail bomb attack by the Unabomber
- I. Kathleen Hagen, 1973, murder suspect
- Thomas Sewall, 1812, physician who gained notoriety for being convicted of body snatching
- John White Webster, 1815, convicted and executed in the Parkman–Webster murder case

== Dentistry ==
- Nathan Cooley Keep, 1827, founding dean of the Harvard School of Dental Medicine
- Winston Patrick Kuo, assistant professor in the developmental biology at Harvard School of Dental Medicine
- Ira B. Lamster, 1990, dean and professor of dentistry at the Columbia University College of Dental Medicine
- William T. G. Morton, non-degreed, dentist and physician who first publicly demonstrated the use of inhaled ether as a surgical anesthetic
- Sheila M. Riggs, chair of the Department of Primary Dental Care at the University of Minnesota School of Dentistry
- William Herbert Rollins, dentist, pioneer in radiation protection
- Derek Steinbacher, chief of the Dental Department and Oral and Maxillofacial Surgery at Yale New Haven Health

== Education ==
- Augustus Burbank, 1847, president of North Yarmouth Academy
- Edward Waldo Emerson, 1874, instructor art anatomy at the School of Fine Arts and superintendent of schools
- John Dix Fisher, 1825, founder of Perkins School for the Blind and doctor credited with introducing the stethoscope into the U.S.
- Samuel Gridley Howe, 1824, first director of the Perkins School for the Blind
- George Adams Leland, 1878, pedagogue, who assisted in the development of the physical education curriculum in Meiji period Japanese education
- Diocletian Lewis, non-degreed, physical culture advocate and founder of the Normal Institute for Physical Education (also known as Boston Normal Physical Training School)
- Robert Traill Spence Lowell, non-degreed, Episcopal clergyman, missionary, inspector of schools for Bermuda, and headmaster of St. Mark's School

== Entertainment ==
- Neal Baer, 1996, television writer and producer known for Designated Survivor, ER, and Law & Order: Special Victims Unit
- Uché Blackstock, 2005 emergency physician and Yahoo! News medical contributor
- Joe Brewster, 1978, filmmaker
- Henry Strong Durand, 1888, co-composer of "Bright College Years", the Yale University alma mater
- David Foster, 1995, television writer, producer, and medical doctor best known as a writer/producer on the medical drama series House
- Shep Ginandes, 1951, folk singer and song collector
- Dean Hamer, geneticist, author, and documentary filmmaker
- Allan Hamilton, physician and medical consultant to ABC's medical drama Grey's Anatomy
- Robert Huizenga, author, team physician for the Los Angeles Raiders, and contributor on multiple reality television shows
- Joseph Stevens Jones, 1843, playwright and actor
- Charles Krauthammer, 1975, political columnist, won the Pulitzer Prize for his work in The Washington Post
- Pam Ling, cast member on The Real World: San Francisco
- Mehret Mandefro, film/television producer, writer, physician and anthropologist
- George Howard Monks, 1880, invented the board game Halma
- John P. Ordway, 1859, music publisher and composer
- Vanessa Parise, non-degreed, film and television director, producer, and writer
- Maurice W. Parker Sr., non-degreed, vocal coach
- Alan Rich, music critic
- Howard Rubenstein, 1957, playwright
- Valerie Weiss, filmmaker and producer
- Samuel Wong, orchestra conductor

== Government ==
=== Government officials ===
- S. Ward Casscells, 1979, assistant secretary of defense for health affairs
- Herbert L. Ley Jr., 1946, 10th commissioner of Food and Drugs
- Kathie L. Olsen, deputy director and chief operating officer of the National Science Foundation
- Steve Pieczenik, U.S. deputy assistant secretary of state
- Alberto Romualdez, non-degreed, secretary of health for the Philippines
- Mark L. Rosenberg, assistant surgeon general and rear admiral in the United States Public Health Service
- Farrokh Saidi, 1954, under-secretary for Medical Education and Health Services of Iran and dean of Medical School, Pahlavi University School of Medicine
- Benjamin Sommers, 2007, deputy assistant secretary for planning and evaluation for Health Policy in the Department of Health and Human Services
- Donald L. Weaver, 1973, rear admiral in the United States Public Health Service Commissioned Corps and acting U.S. surgeon general

=== National Institutes of Health ===
- Hugh Auchincloss, immunologist and acting director of the National Institute of Allergy and Infectious Diseases
- Frederic Bartter, 1940, endocrinologist known for his discovery of syndrome of inappropriate antidiuretic hormone and Bartter syndrome, and chief of the National Institutes of Health Endocrine-Hypertension Branch
- Harold F. Blum, non-degreed, founding member of the National Cancer Institute
- Roscoe Brady, 1947, biochemist and chief of the Developmental and Metabolic Neurology Branch in the National Institute of Neurological Disorders and Stroke, National Institutes of Health
- Josephine Briggs, 1970, director emeritus of the National Center for Complementary and Integrative Health of the National Institutes of Health
- Robert H. Carter, 1982, rheumatologist, physician-scientist, and deputy director of the National Institute of Arthritis and Musculoskeletal and Skin Diseases
- Bruce Chabner, 1965, National Cancer Institute researcher and director of its division of cancer treatment
- Stephen Chanock, 1983, director of the Division of Cancer Epidemiology and Genetics at the U.S. National Cancer Institute
- Michael F. Chiang, ophthalmologist serving as the director of the National Eye Institute
- David Glendenning Cogan, 1930, chair of Harvard Medical School's ophthalmology department and chief of neuro-ophthalmology at the NIH's National Eye Institute
- Rex Cowdry, 1973, director of the National Institute of Mental Health and executive director of the Maryland Health Care Commission
- Cynthia E. Dunbar, 1984, scientist and hematologist at the National Heart Lung and Blood Institute of the National Institutes of Health
- Edward Evarts, 1948, chief of the Laboratory of Neurophysiology at the National Institute of Mental Health
- Mitchell H. Gail, 1968, investigator at the National Cancer Institute
- Gary H. Gibbons, cardiologist and the director of the National Heart, Lung, and Blood Institute
- Roger I. Glass, 1972, director of the John E. Fogarty International Center
- Michael M. Gottesman, 1970, deputy director of the National Institutes of Health and chief of the laboratory of cell biology at the National Cancer Institute
- Alan Edward Guttmacher, 1981, director of the Eunice Kennedy Shriver National Institute of Child Health and Human Development
- Bernadine Healy, 1970, director of the National Institutes of Health and CEO of the American Red Cross
- George Khoury, chief of the molecular virology laboratory at the National Cancer Institute
- Philip Leder, 1960, director of the Laboratory for Molecular Genetics and head of the biochemistry department of the Graduate Program of the Foundation for Advanced Education in the Sciences at the National Institute of Health
- Michael D. Lockshin, 1963, first as director of the extramural program and acting director of the National Institute of Arthritis and Musculoskeletal and Skin Diseases of the National Institutes of Health
- Stephanie J. London, deputy chief of the epidemiology branch at the National Institute of Environmental Health Sciences of the National Institutes of Health
- Loren Mosher, chief of the Center for Studies of Schizophrenia in the National Institute of Mental Health
- Gary Nabel, 1982, founding director of Vaccine Research Center at the National Institute of Allergy and Infectious Diseases of the National Institutes of Health
- Judith L. Rapoport, 1959, chief of the Child Psychiatry Branch at the National Institute of Mental Health (NIMH), part of the National Institutes of Health
- David Sachs, 1968, chief of the Immunology Branch of the National Cancer Institute, where his research led to the discovery of class II MHC
- Joseph D. Schulman, 1966, founder and director of the Interinstitute Program in Medical Genetics at the National Institute of Child Health and Human Development
- Herbert Tabor, 1941, principal investigator at the National Institute of Diabetes and Digestive and Kidney Diseases
- Bryan J. Traynor, 2004, senior investigator at the National Institute on Aging
- Margaret A. Tucker, director of the National Cancer Institute human genetics program
- Thomas A. Waldmann, 1955, immunologist and distinguished investigator at the Lymphoid Malignancies Branch of the National Cancer Institute
- I. Bernard Weinstein, physician and researcher who studied the effect of pollutants and headed the Comprehensive Cancer Center
- Robert E. Wittes, 1968, director of the Division of Cancer Treatment and Diagnosis National Cancer Institute

=== Other U.S. agencies ===
- Donald Berwick, administrator of the Centers for Medicare and Medicaid Services and president and chief executive officer of the Institute for Healthcare Improvement
- Mina Bissell, 1969, biologist with the Lawrence Berkeley National Laboratory and breast cancer researcher
- David Blumenthal, 1975, academic physician and health care policy expert, known as the National Coordinator for Health Information Technology
- Claire V. Broome, 1975, epidemiologist; deputy director, active director and senior advisor with the Centers for Disease Control; and assistant surgeon general in the US Public Health Service
- Victoria Chan-Palay, 1975, neuroscientist, White House Fellow and an assistant to Secretary of Defense Harold Brown, and founder of journal Dementia and Geriatric Cognitive Disorders
- George W. Comstock, 1941, captain with the U.S. Public Health Service
- Nils Daulaire, 1976, assistant secretary for global affairs at the United States Department of Health and Human Services and the U.S. representative on the World Health Organization executive board
- Warren Fales Draper, 1910, deputy surgeon general of the United States Public Health Service
- Shereef Elnahal, U.S. under secretary of veterans affairs for health and commissioner of the New Jersey Department of Health
- Daniel Feikin, director of epidemiology at the International Vaccine Access Center and worked at the Centers for Disease Control and Prevention
- Atul Gawande, 1995, assistant administrator of the United States Agency for International Development
- Margaret Hamburg, 1983, commissioner of the U.S. Food and Drug Administration
- Ashish Jha, 1997, White House COVID-19 Response Coordinator and dean of the Brown University School of Public Health
- David A. Kessler, 1979, chief science officer of the White House COVID-19 Response Team and commissioner of the Food and Drug Administration
- J. Michael Lane, 1961, director of the Epidemic Intelligence Service's Global Smallpox Eradication
- John H. Lawrence, physicist and physician with the Lawrence Berkeley National Laboratory, best known for pioneering the field of nuclear medicine
- Charles Grafton Page, 1836, senior patent examiner in the United States Patent Office, electrical experimenter, and inventor
- Robert Rodriguez, emergency physician and was a member of the COVID-19 Advisory Board
- Yvette Roubideaux, 1989, director of the Indian Health Service, an agency within the Department of Health and Human Services
- Joshua Sharfstein, 1996, principal deputy commissioner of the U.S. Food and Drug Administration and secretary of the Maryland Department of Health
- Melinda Wharton, associate director for vaccine policy at the National Center for Immunization and Respiratory Diseases

=== State and county officials ===
- Samuel Warren Abbott, 1862, surgeon who helped inaugurate the first medical examiner system in Massachusetts and became the first secretary of Massachusetts' first state board of health
- David Axelrod, 1960, health commissioner for the State of New York
- JudyAnn Bigby, secretary of the Executive Office of Health and Human Services of Massachusetts and director of the Harvard Medical School Center of Excellence in Women's Health
- Oni Blackstock, HIV physician, researcher, and assistant commissioner for the Bureau of HIV for the New York City Department of Health
- Henry Ingersoll Bowditch, 1832, founder and chair of the Massachusetts State Board of Health and prominent Christian abolitionist
- William A. Brooks, 1891, chief surgeon Massachusetts State Guard, acting surgeon general of Massachusetts, and medical director for the United States Shipping Board
- Shereef Elnahal, United States under secretary of Veterans Affairs for Health and commissioner of the New Jersey Department of Health
- Jonathan Fielding, 1969, director and health officer of the Los Angeles County Department of Public Health
- Joseph Ladapo, 2008, surgeon general of Florida
- Woody Myers, Indiana state health commissioner and New York City health commissioner
- Paul F. O'Rourke, 1948, founding member of Operation USA and its first board chair and first Director of the California State Office of Economic Opportunity
- Joshua Sharfstein, 1996, secretary of the Maryland Department of Health and principal deputy commissioner of the U.S. Food and Drug Administration
- Harry C. Solomon, 1914, Massachusetts State Commissioner of Mental Health and Superintendent of the Boston Psychopathic Hospital
- Leonard White, physician and health officer in Massachusetts involved with the earliest study of mosquitoes and malaria

== Literature and journalism ==
=== Authors ===
- Rafael Campo, poet
- Ethan Canin, 1991, author and member of the faculty of the Iowa Writers' Workshop
- Michael Crichton, 1969, novelist and filmmaker
- Srully Blotnick, 1994, author and journalist
- Amy Dockser Marcus, staff reporter for the New York bureau of The Wall Street Journal and 2005 Pulitzer Prize for Beat Reporting
- David Ehrenfeld, 1963, author and twentieth-century conservation biologist
- Alice Weaver Flaherty, author of textbooks and popular nonfiction
- Justin A. Frank, author and contributor to The Huffington Post
- John Freund, satirist, author, and co-founder of Intuitive Surgical
- Arthur Guyton, physiologist known for his Textbook of Medical Physiology
- Steve Hoffmann, author
- Oliver Wendell Holmes Sr., 1836, poet acclaimed by his peers as one of the best writers of the day
- Perri Klass, 1986, writer and professor of journalism and pediatrics at New York University
- Robert Means Lawrence, 1873, writer and physician
- Bruce Y. Lee, senior contributor for Forbes
- John E. Mack, 1955, head of the department of psychiatry at Harvard Medical School who won the Pulitzer Prize for his book A Prince of Our Disorder
- Orison Swett Marden, 1881, inspirational author
- Siddhartha Mukherjee, physician, author, and biologist
- David G. Nathan, pediatrician, hematologist, and author of Nathan and Oski's Hematology of Infancy and Childhood, a standard reference in pediatrics in its 7th edition
- Justin Richardson, award-winning children's book author
- Wyman Richardson, author and naturalist
- Elisabeth Rosenthal, 1986, The New York Times reporter who focused on health and environment matters
- Wilfredo Santa-Gómez, author of books on self-help, short stories, and poetry
- Samuel Shem, author and dramatist
- Lewis Thomas, essayist, poet, and winner of the National Book Awards in two categories and dean of Yale Medical School and New York University School of Medicine
- Mark Vonnegut, 1979, author, pediatrician, and son of writer Kurt Vonnegut
- Cuthbert Ormond Simpkins, 1974, biographer
- Victor C. Strasburger, pediatrician and author
- Ken Walker, 1950, syndicated medical writer
- Charles Woodward Stearns, non-degreed, non-fiction writer
- Oneeka Williams, children's book author

=== Editors ===
- Walter Prentice Bowers, first editor and managing editor of The New England Journal of Medicine
- Victoria Chan-Palay, 1975, neuroscientist, founder of journal Dementia and Geriatric Cognitive Disorders, and White House Fellow and an assistant to Secretary of Defense Harold Brown
- Frank Spooner Churchill, pediatrician and chief editor of the American Journal of Diseases of Children
- William Dameshek, hematologist and founder of Blood, the prime core clinical journal of hematology
- Jeffrey M. Drazen, 1972, editor-in-chief of The New England Journal of Medicine
- Joseph Garland, editor of The New England Journal of Medicine
- Robert Goldwyn, chief of Plastic Surgery at the Beth Israel Hospital and editor-in-chief of Plastic and Reconstructive Surgery
- Beth Karlan, editor-in-chief of the medical journals Gynecologic Oncology and Gynecologic Oncology Reports
- Harold C. Sox, editor of the Annals of Internal Medicine, associate editor of Scientific America Medicine, and consulting associate editor of The American Journal of Medicine
- Hermon F. Titus, 1890, factional leader of the Socialist Party of Washington and editor of The Socialist
- Jack Yang, editor-in-chief of the International Journal of Computational Biology and Drug Design

== Medicine ==
=== Cardiology ===
- Redmond Burke, 1984, founder of The Congenital Heart Institute at Miami Children's Hospital
- Ralph de la Torre, cardiologist and former CEO of bankrupt Steward Health Care, who allegedly mismanaged company funds for personal gain, contributing to Steward's bankruptcy
- James Rippe, 1979, cardiologist, founder and director of the Rippe Lifestyle Institute (now Rippe Health)
- John Parsons Shillingford, 1943, physician and cardiologist, known as a pioneer of the introduction of coronary care units in the United Kingdom
- Frederick Douglass Stubbs, 1931, thoracic surgeon who received national acclaim for his advancements the surgical treatment of pulmonary tuberculosis
- Louis Wolff, 1922, cardiologist and chief of the electrocardiographic laboratory at Beth Israel Hospital
- Paul Zoll, 1936, cardiologist and one of the pioneers in the development of the artificial cardiac pacemaker and cardiac defibrillator

=== Endocrinology ===
- Fuller Albright, endocrinologist
- Robert C. Kolodny, writer and head of the endocrine research section of the Masters and Johnson Institute
- Christos Socrates Mantzoros, chief of endocrinology, diabetes, and metabolism at the VA Boston Healthcare System and founding director of human nutrition at Beth Israel Deaconess Medical Center
- Alexander Marble, 1927, diabetologist at the Joslin Diabetes Center

=== Gastroenterology ===
- David Hershel Alpers, 1960, gastroenterologist
- Ronald A. Malt, 1955, chief of gastroenterological surgery and the surgical chief of the Liver, Biliary and Pancreas Center at Massachusetts General Hospital

=== Genetics ===
- William French Anderson, 1963, geneticist and molecular biologist known as the "father of gene therapy"
- Paul Billings, 1979, geneticist
- Joel Hirschhorn, human geneticist, pediatrician, and endocrinologist
- D. Holmes Morton, physician specializing in genetic disorders of Old Order Amish and Mennonite children who established the Clinic for Special Children

=== Gynecology ===
- James Read Chadwick, 1871, gynecologist and medical librarian remembered for describing the Chadwick sign of early pregnancy
- Nawal M. Nour, obstetrician and gynecologist who directs the Ambulatory Obstetrics Practice at the Brigham and Women's Hospital
- John Rock, 1918, founder of the Rock Reproductive Study Center at the Free Hospital for Women known for the development of the first birth control pill

=== Hematology ===
- William Bosworth Castle, hematologist
- Thomas P. Stossel, hematologist, inventor, and medical researcher that discovered gelsolin and invented the BioAegis technology

=== Hospital administration ===
- R. Rox Anderson, dermatologist and director of the Wellman Center for Photomedicine at Massachusetts General Hospital William Barnes, 1886, entomologist, founder and president of Decatur Memorial Hospital
- Edward J. Benz Jr., 1973, president of Dana–Farber Cancer Institute
- George Crile Jr., 1933, head of the Cleveland Clinic Department of General Surgery who was influential in breast cancer treatment
- Nancy E. Davidson, 1979, executive director and president of Seattle Cancer Care Alliance, senior vice president, director of clinical oncology at Fred Hutchinson Cancer Center
- Allan S. Detsky, 1978, physician-in-chief at Mount Sinai Hospital, Toronto
- Orrin Devinsky, 1982, director of the NYU Comprehensive Epilepsy Center and the Saint Barnabas Institute of Neurology and Neurosurgery
- Betty Diamond, 1973, director of the Institute of Molecular Medicine at Northwell Health's Feinstein Institute for Medical Research
- Harold F. Dvorak, pathologist and founding director of the Center for Vascular Biology Research at the Beth Israel Deaconess Medical Center
- Mark Fishman, 1976, chief of cardiology and director of the Cardiovascular Research Center at Massachusetts General Hospital
- Irwin Freedberg, 1956, professor and chairman of the Ronald O. Perelman Department of Dermatology at the New York University Medical Center
- Charles S. Fuchs, director of the Yale Cancer Center
- George W. Galvin, founder of the Boston Emergency and General Hospital, the first emergency hospital in the United States
- Monica Gandhi, director of the UCSF Medical Center Gladstone Center for AIDS Research and the medical director of the San Francisco General Hospital HIV Clinic
- Laurie Glimcher, 1976, president and CEO, Dana–Farber Cancer Institute
- Edward H. Hill, 1867, founder of Central Maine Medical Center
- Edwin C. J. T. Howard, 1869, instrumental in establishing the Frederick Douglass Memorial Hospital and Training School, the only hospital for African Americans in Philadelphia
- Kurt Julius Isselbacher, 1950, director emeritus of the Massachusetts General Hospital Cancer Center
- Sachin H. Jain, 2008, CEO of CareMore Health System
- Elliott P. Joslin, first medical doctor in the United States to specialize in diabetes and founder of the Joslin Diabetes Center
- Mitchell H. Katz, president and CEO of New York City Health and Hospitals
- Frank Lahey, 1904, physician who founded the Lahey Clinic
- Philip J. Landrigan, 1967, director of the Children's Environmental Health Center and the chair of the Department of Preventive Medicine at Mount Sinai Medical Center
- Aristides Leão, 1943, neurophysiologist and director of the Instituto de Biofísica Carlos Chagas Filho
- John Mendelsohn, 1963, president of the MD Anderson Cancer Center
- Marius Nygaard Smith-Petersen, 1914, chief of orthopaedic service at Massachusetts General Hospital
- Tom Douglas Spies, 1927, director of Nutrition Clinic at the Hillman Hospital
- Frederick Winsor, head of the Massachusetts State Hospital
- Rufus Wyman, 1799, superintendent of the Asylum for the Insane and the McLean Asylum

=== Immunology ===
- Fritz Bach, 1960, pioneer in the field of transplant immunology
- Zanvil A. Cohn, 1953. cell biologist and immunologist

=== Infectious disease ===
- Lawrence Eron, 1971, infectious diseases specialist
- David Ho, infectious disease physician
- Henry Austin Martin, 1845, physician known for introducing the method of production and use of smallpox vaccine lymph from calves
- Thomas C. Peebles, physician who was the first to isolate the measles virus
- Sallie Permar, 2004, pediatrician-in-chief at NewYork-Presbyterian / Weill Cornell Medical Center

=== Medical research ===
- George Cotzias, helped develop the L-Dopa treatment for Parkinson's disease and winner of the 1969 Albert Lasker Award for Clinical Medical Research
- Hallowell Davis, 1922, director of research at the Central Institute for the Deaf and contributor to the invention of the electroencephalograph
- Maxwell Finland, 1926, medical researcher who led seminal research of antibiotic treatment of pneumonia
- Robert Edward Gross, 1931, medical researcher in pediatric heart surgery at Boston Children's Hospital
- Kathryn T. Hall, 1996, molecular biologist specializing in placebo research
- William Hammon, 1936, physician and researcher, best known for his work on poliomyelitis
- Saul Hertz, 1929, the father of the field of theranostics, noted for targeted cancer therapies
- David Hurwitz, 1931, researcher in diabetes mellitus, considered "the father of the community hospital teaching concept"
- M. Charles Liberman, 1976, director of the Eaton-Peabody Laboratory at the Massachusetts Eye and Ear Infirmary
- John P. Merrill, 1942, medical researcher who performed the world's first successful kidney transplant; the"father of nephrology"
- Vamsi Mootha, physician-scientist and computational biologist, investigator of the Howard Hughes Medical Institute
- Thomas Francis O'Brien, researcher of antimicrobial resistance, co-creator of WHONET, an antibiotic resistance tracker database
- Jean E. Schaffer, senior investigator at the Joslin Diabetes Center

=== Neurology ===
- Carmela Abraham, neuroscientist who focuses on the study of Alzheimer's disease
- Robert B. Aird, educator, neurologist and epileptologist
- Bronson Crothers, 1909, pediatric neurologist at the Children's Hospital in Boston and professor at Harvard Medical School
- Merit Cudkowicz, director of the ALS clinic, director of the Neurological Clinical Research Institute, and chair of the Department of Neurology at Massachusetts General Hospital
- Peter Huttenlocher, 1957, pediatric neurologist and neuroscientist who discovered how the brain develops in children
- Keith Johnson, neurologist and radiologist working at Massachusetts General Hospital
- Barry Jordan, 1981, neurologist and the assistant medical director at Burke Rehabilitation Hospital
- William Gordon Lennox, neurologist and epileptologist who was a pioneer in the use of electroencephalography
- Tracy Putnam, 1920, co-discoverer of Dilantin for controlling epilepsy and director of the New York Neurological Institute
- Thomas Schwarz, neuroscientist and molecular biology researcher at Boston Children's Hospital
- Harold Wolff, professor of medicine and chief neurologist at New York Hospital – Cornell Medical Center

=== Oncology ===
- Harry Bisel, oncologist and one of the founding members of the American Society of Clinical Oncology
- Sarah Donaldson, 1968, pioneer in pediatric radiation oncology
- James D. Griffin, 1974, chair of medical oncology at Dana–Farber Cancer Institute, and director of medical oncology at Brigham and Women's Hospital
- Matthew Kulke, chief of hematology/oncology and co-director of the Boston Medical Center Cancer Center
- John Laszlo, 1955, oncologist known for advancing childhood leukemia treatment; national VP for Research at the American Cancer Society
- Nancy Lin, oncologist at the Dana-Farber Cancer Institute; associate professor of medicine at Harvard Medical School
- Kenneth Offit, chair in inherited cancer genomics at Memorial Sloan Kettering Cancer Center

=== Pathology ===
- J. Keith Joung, pathologist and molecular biologist who holds the chair in Pathology at Massachusetts General Hospital
- Cornelius P. Rhoads, 1924, pathologist, oncologist, and hospital administrator who was involved in a racist scandal
- Shields Warren, 1923, pathologist at New England Deaconess Hospital (Beth Israel Deaconess Medical Center)
- Stephen Waxman, pathologist-in-chief at Beth Israel Deaconess Medical Center
- Simeon Burt Wolbach, 1903, pathologist and researcher who elucidated the infection vectors for Rocky Mountain spotted fever and epidemic typhus

=== Pediatrics ===
- Allan Macy Butler, 1926, pioneer in health service and chief of the Children's Medical Services at Massachusetts General Hospital
- William Bacon Carey, 1954, clinical professor of pediatrics at the University of Pennsylvania Perelman School of Medicine
- Eric Chien-Wei Liao, 2002, founding director of the Center for Craniofacial Innovation at the Children's Hospital of Philadelphia
- Louis Diamond, 1927, pediatrician, known as the "father of pediatric hematology"
- Sidney Farber, 1927, pediatric pathologist, regarded as the "father" of modern chemotherapy
- Rustin McIntosh, 1918, chief of pediatrics at the Babies Hospital of NewYork–Presbyterian Hospital

=== Physician ===
- Cecil H. Coggins, 1958, physician who specialized in nephrology and editor of the Annual Review of Medicine
- Samuel E. Courtney, 1894, physician in Boston, early African American graduate of HMS
- Ephraim Cutter, 1856, physician and pioneer of laryngology and discovered the tuberculosis cattle test
- Yolanda George-David, Nigerian medical doctor, radio host, and humanitarian
- Vincent Dole, physician developed the use of methadone to treat heroin addiction
- Thomas Graham Dorsey, 1869, one of the first African-American doctors to graduate from HMS
- Daniel Laing Jr., non-degreed, one of the first African-American physicians
- Seymour London, 1940, physician and inventor who created the first automatic blood pressure monitor
- Isaac H. Snowden, non-degreed, African-American physician in Liberia
- Horatio Storer, 1853, physician, leader of the Physicians' Crusade Against Abortion
- Charles Eliot Ware, 1837, prominent Boston physician
- Andrew Weil, 1968, proponent of alternative medicine and integrative medicine
- Robert O. Wilson, 1929, physician at Drum Tower Hospital of University of Nanking
- George Barker Windship, physician who introduced weight training in the United States
- Whitfield Winsey, 1871, first African American doctor admitted to the Medical and Chirurgical Faculty of Maryland
- Alfred Worcester, 1883, general practitioner known for pioneering work in the treatment of appendicitis and the use of Caesarean section
- Louis T. Wright, 1915 researcher, practitioner, first black Fellow of the American College of Surgeons
- Morrill Wyman, 1937, physician who studied hayfiever

=== Radiology ===
- Walter J. Dodd, non-degreed, one of the first radiologists in the United States and an early innovator in the use of X-rays
- Stanley Boyd Eaton, 1964, radiologist and one of the originators of the concept of Paleolithic nutrition
- Daniel Kopans, 1972, radiologist specializing in mammography and founder of the Breast Imaging Division at the Massachusetts General Hospital

=== Surgery ===
- Fred H. Albee, surgeon who invented bone grafting and other advances in orthopedic surgery
- Dudley Peter Allen, 1879, surgeon, teacher, and writer
- Kathryn Anderson, pediatric surgeon and first woman president of the American Pediatric Surgical Association
- Alfred Bennison Atherton, 1866, surgeon, gynaecologist, and obstetrician
- N. Scott Adzick, surgeon-in-chief at Children's Hospital of Philadelphia
- Adam Brook, thoracic surgeon at St. Joseph's Medical Center
- Bradford Cannon, chief of plastic and reconstructive surgery at Massachusetts General Hospital
- Richard Cattell, pioneering biliary duct reconstructive surgeon
- Edward Delos Churchill, 1920, thoracic surgery and remembered for describing the Churchill-Cope reflex
- Ernest Amory Codman, 1895, surgeon who made contributions to anaesthesiology, oncology, and the study of medical outcomes
- William Coley, 1888, bone surgeon and cancer researcher best known as the "father of cancer immunotherapy
- Joel D. Cooper, 1964, thoracic surgeon, known for having completed the first successful lung transplant
- Oliver Cope, 1928, surgeon known for his work in parathyroid surgery, burns treatment and breast cancer treatment
- Harvey Cushing, 1895, first exclusive neurosurgeon and first person to describe Cushing's disease
- Forest Dewey Dodrill, 1930, performed the first successful open heart surgery using a mechanical pump
- Jeffrey Drebin, department of surgery chair at Memorial Sloan Kettering Cancer Center
- Eugene Fuller, surgeon and pioneer of the procedure of suprapubic prostatectomy
- Robert Goldwyn, chief of Plastic Surgery at the Beth Israel Hospital and editor-in-chief of Plastic and Reconstructive Surgery for 25 years
- Ramon Guiteras, pioneering surgeon who specialized in urology and founded the American Urological Association
- Dwight Harken, chief of thoracic surgery at Harvard University and innovator in heart surgery
- Michael R. Harrison, chief in pediatric surgery at the Children's Hospital at the University of California, San Francisco
- Griffith R. Harsh, 1980, chair of the Department of Neurological Surgery at UC Davis Health
- Andrew C. Hecht, 1994, chief of spine surgery for the Mount Sinai Health System and The Mount Sinai Hospital
- Richard Hodges, 1850, visiting surgeon and adjunct professor of surgery at Massachusetts General Hospital
- John Homans, surgeon who described Homans' sign
- Robert William Hooper, surgeon at the Massachusetts Charitable Eye and Ear Infirmary
- John W. Kirklin, 1942, chair of the department of surgery at the Mayo Clinic
- Leonard B. Kaban, chair of the Department of Oral and Maxillofacial Surgery at the Massachusetts General Hospital
- William E. Ladd, 1906, surgeon-in-chief at Boston Children's Hospital and one of the founders of pediatric surgery
- Ralph Millard, 1944, plastic surgeon who developed several techniques used in cleft lip and palate surgeries
- Francis Daniels Moore, 1939, surgeon who was a pioneer in numerous experimental surgical treatments
- Joel Mark Noe, 1969, plastic surgeon at Beth Israel Hospital
- Taine Pechet, 1992, thoracic surgeon and chief of surgery at the Penn Presbyterian Medical Center
- John Reinisch, plastic surgeon and director of Craniofacial and Pediatric Plastic Surgery at Cedars-Sinai Medical Center
- Alfredo Quiñones-Hinojosa, professor and chair of Neurologic Surgery at the Mayo Clinic Jacksonville
- Ernest Sachs Jr., 1942, neurosurgeon at Hitchcock Medical Center
- William Sharpe, brain surgeon
- Roy Glenwood Spurling, 1923, neurosurgeon remembered for describing Spurling's test
- Orvar Swenson, 1937, pediatric surgeon, performed first surgery for Hirschsprung's disease
- Augustus Thorndike, 1921, chief of surgery at Harvard University Health Service and pioneer in sports medicine
- Jonathan Mason Warren, 1832, one of the first surgeons to perform rhinoplasty operations
- Claude E. Welch, surgeon at the Massachusetts General Hospital
- Robert J. White, 1953, neurosurgeon who performed the first monkey head transplant
- Blake Colburn Wilbur, 1925, surgeon and one of the co-founders of the Palo Alto Medical Clinic

== Military ==
- Zabdiel Boylston Adams, 1853, head surgeon for the 32nd Regiment Massachusetts Volunteer Infantry during the Civil War
- Joseph Barnes, non-degreed, 12th surgeon general of the U.S. Army
- George Adams Bright, 1858, United States Navy rear admiral and medical director of the U.S. Navy and head of the Naval Hospital in Washington, D.C.
- Andrew E. Budson, 1993, chief of cognitive and behavioral neurology associate chief of staff for education at the veterans affairs and professor at Boston University School of Medicine
- Charles H. Crane, 1847, surgeon general of the U.S. Army
- Elliott Cutler, 1913, brigadier general in the U.S. Army Medical Corps
- Martin Delany, non-degreed, first proponent of black nationalism and first African-American field officer in the US
- James Madison DeWolf, 1875, acting assistant surgeon in the U.S. 7th Cavalry Regiment who was killed in the Battle of the Little Big Horn
- John Miller Turpin Finney, brigadier general during World War I remembered as the first president of the American College of Surgeons
- Harold W. Jones, 1901, director of the U.S. Army Medical Library
- Joseph Lovell, 1811, surgeon general of the U.S. Army
- Manuel Morales, biophysicist at the Naval Medical Research Institute
- Frank Otis, flight surgeon for the Massachusetts Air National Guard's 101st Observation Squadron
- Paul Spangler, naval surgeon
- George Augustus Wheeler, 1859, surgeon of United States Volunteers in charge of the U.S. General Hospital at Annapolis Junction, Maryland during the Civil War
- Edward A. Wild, 1846, brigadier general in the Union Army during the American Civil War
- Leonard Wood, 1884 chief of staff of the U.S. Army and governor-general of the Philippines
- Yeu-Tsu Margaret Lee, 1961, member of the Army Medical Corps and chief of surgical oncology atTripler Army Medical Center

== Museology ==
- George Lincoln Goodale, 1863, botanist and first director of Harvard's Botanical Museum (now part of the Harvard Museum of Natural History)
- Joseph Bassett Holder, curator of invertebrates of the American Museum of Natural History
- J. B. S. Jackson, 1829, first curator of the Warren Anatomical Museum and was dean of Harvard Medical School
- William Fiske Whitney, 1875, anatomist and pioneer in the field of the medical museum
- Jeffries Wyman, 1837, first curator of the Peabody Museum of Archaeology and Ethnology and taught anatomy at Harvard Medical School

== Nobel Prize laureates ==
- Christian B. Anfinsen, 1942, biochemist and Nobel laureate, professor and researcher
- J. Michael Bishop, 1962, immunologist, microbiologist, faculty of the University of California, San Francisco who shared the 1989 Nobel Prize in Physiology or Medicine
- Jennifer Doudna, 1989, 2020 Nobel Prize recipient in the field of chemistry for the discovery of CRISPR Cas9
- John Franklin Enders, 1930, biomedical scientist who shared the 1954 Nobel Prize in Physiology or Medicine, called "the Father of Modern Vaccines"
- Daniel Carleton Gajdusek, 1946, chief of the Laboratory of Central Nervous System Studies at the National Institutes of Health and co-recipient of the Nobel Prize in Physiology or Medicine
- George H. Hitchings, shared the 1988 Nobel Prize in Physiology or Medicine
- Charles Brenton Huggins, 1924, Nobel Prize for Physiology or Medicine in 1966
- George Minot, 1912, researcher who shared the 1934 Nobel Prize for pioneering work on pernicious anemia
- William P. Murphy, 1922, physician who shared the 1934 Nobel Prize in Physiology or Medicine for pioneering work on pernicious anemia
- Joseph Murray, surgeon who shared the Nobel Prize in Physiology or Medicine in 1990
- Frederick Chapman Robbins, virologist who shared the Nobel Prize in Physiology or Medicine in 1954
- Ralph M. Steinman, 1968, recipient of the 2011 Nobel Prize in Physiology or Medicine
- James B. Sumner, 1914, chemist and winner of the Nobel Prize in Chemistry in 1946
- E. Donnall Thomas, 1946, shared the 1990 Nobel Prize in Physiology or Medicine for the development of cell and organ transplantation
- Thomas Huckle Weller, 1940, virologist and co-recipient of a Nobel Prize in Physiology or Medicine in 1954

== Nonprofit ==
- Seth Berkley, founder and former president and CEO of the International AIDS Vaccine Initiative (IAVI) and former CEO of Gavi, the Vaccine Alliance
- Peter Diamandis, 1989, founder and chairman of the X Prize Foundation, co-founder and executive chairman of Singularity University, and author
- Paul Farmer, 1990, co-founder of Partners in Health and chair of Department of Global Health and Social Medicine at Harvard Medical School
- Frank Fremont-Smith, 1921, administrator and executive with the Josiah Macy Jr. Foundation and president of the World Federation for Mental Health
- Clarence Gamble, 1920, advocate of birth control and founder of Pathfinder International
- Phillips Foster Greene, 1919, director of the American Red Cross in China
- Alan Gregg, 1916, director of the Medical Sciences Division and vice president of the Rockefeller Foundation
- Bernadine Healy, 1970, director of the National Institutes of Health and CEO of the American Red Cross
- Patrick Hogan, professor in the division of signaling and gene expression at the La Jolla Institute for Immunology
- Vanessa Kerry, founder of the non-profit Seed Global Health and daughter of John Kerry
- Risa Lavizzo-Mourey, president and CEO of the Robert Wood Johnson Foundation
- Margaret A. Liu, director of Ipsen S.A. and president of the International Society of Vaccines
- Borna Nyaoke-Anoke, head of mycetoma research at Drugs for Neglected Diseases Initiative
- Paul F. O'Rourke, 1948, founding member of Operation USA and its first board chair and first Director of the California State Office of Economic Opportunity
- Richard Rockefeller, chairman of the United States Advisory Board of Doctors Without Borders
- Manny Sethi, 2005, president and founder of the non-profit Healthy Tennessee and an orthopedic trauma surgeon at Vanderbilt University Medical Center
- Susan L. Swain, director and president of the Trudeau Institute
- John Templeton Jr., president of the John Templeton Foundation
- Robert Tjian, 1976, president of the Howard Hughes Medical Institute
- William H. Thomas, 1986, creator of Green House Project
- Edgar Wayburn, 1930, environmentalist who served as the president of the Sierra Club five times
- Nathan Wolfe, virologist; founder and director of Global Viral

== Ophthalmology ==
- Balamurali Ambati, ophthalmologist, educator, and Guinness Book of World Records youngest doctor
- Horace Barlow, 1946, vision scientist
- Jean Bennett, 1986, professor of ophthalmology in the Perelman School of Medicine at the University of Pennsylvania
- Andrew Caster, 1980, ophthalmologist; cataract and refractive surgery expert
- Edward Lorenzo Holmes, ophthalmologist who founded The University of Illinois Eye and Ear Infirmary
- John Jeffries II, 1819, ophthalmic surgeon who co-founded the Massachusetts Charitable Eye and Ear Infirmary
- S. Rodman Irvine, 1936, ophthalmologist and ophthalmic surgeon, known for the Irvine-Gass syndrome
- Herbert E. Kaufman, 1956, ophthalmologist who discovered idoxuridine
- Joan Miller, 1985, ophthalmologist
- Perry Rosenthal, non-degreed, ophthalmologist and co-founder of Polymer Technology Inc., which developed Boston Lens products
- George Spaeth, ophthalmologist specializing in glaucoma at Wills Eye Institute
- Terri Young, 1986, chair of the Department of Ophthalmology and Visual Sciences at the University of Wisconsin School of Medicine and Public Health

== Pharmacology ==
- Harriet Florence Maling, 1944, pharmacologist

== Politics ==
- Doc Adams, Connecticut House of Representatives and professional baseball player with the New York Knickerbockers
- Azel Ames, 1871, Massachusetts State Legislature
- Arnulfo Arias, president of Panama
- Joseph Avellone, vice president for clinical research services at PAREXEL International and candidate for Massassuchess governor in 2014
- Pierre Baillargeon, Senate of Canada
- James Bates, U.S. House of Representatives
- Frederick William Borden, 1868, Canada minister for Militia and Defence
- David J. Bradley, New Hampshire House of Representatives, author, and member of the 1940 Winter Olympics ski team
- Joseph W. Clift, 1862, U.S. House of Representatives
- Newton Ramsay Colter, House of Commons of Canada
- Richard J. Curran, 1859, New York State Assembly
- Robert T. Davis, 1848, United States House of Representatives from Massachusetts
- Louis-Léon Lesieur Désaulniers, 1846, House of Commons of Canada
- Edwin Durnoc, 1927, United States House of Representatives
- John F. Fitzgerald, non-degreed, United States House of Representatives and mayor of Boston
- Joshua Barker Flint, 1825, Massachusetts House of Representatives
- James B. Forsyth, city councilor, alderman, sixth mayor of Chelsea, Massachusetts
- Bill Frist, 1978, United States Senate 1995–2007
- Lucius F. C. Garvin, 48th governor of Rhode Island, Rhode Island House of Representatives, and Rhode Island Senate
- Samuel Abbott Green, 1854, mayor of Boston
- Ernest Gruening, 1912, governor of the Alaska Territory and member of the United States Senate
- Mary Anne Guggenheim, Montana House of Representatives
- John C. Hall, 1852, Wisconsin State Senate
- Charles-Aimé Kirkland, Legislative Assembly of Quebec
- George W. Kittredge, U.S. House of Representatives and New Hampshire House of Representatives
- Jerry Knirk, New Hampshire House of Representatives
- George B. Loring, 1842, United States House of Representatives, U.S. minister to Portugal, and U.S. commissioner of agriculture
- Mahidol Adulyadej, 1921, prince of Songkla and the father of modern medicine and public health in Thailand
- David R. Moore, Legislative Assembly of New Brunswick, Canada
- Ephraim Bell Muttart, 1861, House of Commons of Canada
- Robert Nelson, leading figure in the Lower Canada Rebellion in 19th-century Quebec and president of Republic of Lower Canada
- Nathaniel Niles Jr., special diplomatic agent in Austria-Hungary and as chargé d’affaires to Sardinia
- Amos Nourse, 1817, United States Senate
- David Orentlicher, Nevada Assembly and Indiana House of Representatives
- Phan Quang Đán, Vietnamese political opposition figure
- Charles A. Phelps, 1844, speaker, of the Massachusetts House of Representatives and president of the Massachusetts Senate
- Nathaniel S. Robinson, 1852, Wisconsin State Assembly
- Olivier Robitaille, 1838, mayor of Quebec City
- Raul Ruiz, U.S. House of Representatives
- Pierre de Sales Laterrière, 1789, seigneur of the municipality Les Éboulements in New France (Canada)
- Benjamin Shurtleff, 1848, California State Senate
- Nathaniel B. Shurtleff, mayor of Boston, Massachusetts
- Victor W. Sidel, founder and president of Physicians for Social Responsibility and co-president of International Physicians for the Prevention of Nuclear War
- Jill Stein, 1979, Green Party's nominee for president of the United States in the 2012 and 2016
- Maltby Strong, non-degreed, mayor of Rochester, New York
- Charles Rumford Walker, New Hampshire State Legislature
- John Wickwire, Nova Scotia House of Assembly
- Charles F. Winslow, 1834, U.S. consul at Payta, Peru
- Leonard Wood, 1884, governor-general of the Philippines and chief of staff of the U.S. Army
- David Wu, non-degreed, United States House of Representatives
- Samuel Zager, Maine House of Representatives

== Psychiatry ==
- Paul S. Appelbaum, 1975, psychiatrist and professor at Columbia University
- Rajendra Badgaiyan, psychiatrist and cognitive neuroscientist
- Perry Cossart Baird Jr., early researcher of bipolar disorder
- Carl Binger, 1914, psychiatrist and author
- Eugene Brody, 1944, psychiatrist, dean for Social and Behavioral Studies at the University of Maryland, and chairman of the Department of Psychiatry at the University of Maryland School of Medicine
- Robert Cabaj, psychiatrist and author known for his extensive publications on LGBT mental health issues
- George Cheyne Shattuck Choate, 1849, founder of Choate House, a psychiatric sanatorium
- John Gordon Clark, psychiatrist known for his research on the effects of cults
- Stanley Cobb, 1914, neurologist and "the founder of biological psychiatry in the United States"
- Raquel Eidelman Cohen, 1949, child psychiatrist specialized in Disaster Management
- Owen Copp, 1884, assistant superintendent at Taunton State Hospital
- Lance Dodes, 1970, psychiatrist and psychoanalyst best known for his theory that all addictions are psychological compulsions
- Robert DuPont, 1963, psychiatrist, known for his advocacy in the field of substance abuse
- Mark Epstein, author and psychotherapist who integrates Shakyamuni Buddha's teachings with Sigmund Freud's approaches to trauma
- Ronald R. Fieve, psychiatrist known for his work on the use of lithium as a treatment of mood disorders
- Nathan Fox, 1975, developmental psychologist and distinguished university professor at the University of Maryland
- Jerome Frank, psychiatrist and professor of psychiatry at the Johns Hopkins University Medical School
- Andrew J. Gerber, psychoanalyst, director of research at the Columbia University Center for Psychoanalytic Training and Research, and president and medical director of Silver Hill Hospital
- Bernard Glueck Jr., 1938, psychiatrist and director of research at The Institute of Living, now part of Hartford Hospital
- James Samuel Gordon, psychiatrist known for mind-body medicine and founder and director of The Center for Mind-Body Medicine
- Michael Grunebaum, 1991, psychiatrist with the New York State Psychiatric Institute
- John G. Gunderson, 1967, psychiatrist and the "father" of borderline personality disorder"
- Lawrence Hartmann, psychiatrist, social-psychiatric activist, and former president of the American Psychiatric Association
- William James, 1869, philosopher, psychologist, and the "father of American psychology"
- Judith V. Jordan, founding scholar of the Jean Baker Miller Institand attending psychologist at McLean Hospital
- Gerald D. Klee, 1952, psychiatrist and medical educator who made public the secret LSD experiments involving American servicemen in the late 1950s
- Harry Kozol, neurologist who helped establish the fields of forensic psychiatry and neuropsychiatry
- Peter D. Kramera, 1976, psychiatrist specializing in clinical depression
- Stefan P. Kruszewski, clinical and forensic psychiatrist, active as a whistleblower in medically related cases
- Shirley F. Marks, 1973, psychiatrist and professor at Baylor College of Medicine
- Karl Menninger, 1917, psychiatrist, member of the Menninger family of psychiatrists who founded the Menninger Foundation and the Menninger Clinic
- John Case Nemiah, 1943, psychiatrist-in-chief at the Beth Israel Hospital
- Walter Pahnke, psychiatrist most famous for the Marsh Chapel Experiment
- Morton Prince, 1879, a leading force in establishing psychology as a clinical and academic discipline and editor of the Journal of Abnormal Psychology
- Chester Middlebrook Pierce, 1952, psychiatrist and professor of education and psychiatry at Harvard Medical School who coined the term "microaggression"
- Harrison Pope, 1974, professor of psychiatry at Harvard Medical School and an attending physician at McLean Hospital
- Harold Searles, pioneer of psychiatric medicine who specialized in psychoanalytic treatments of schizophrenia
- Boris Sidis, psychologist and philosopher of education, founded the New York State Psychopathic Institute and the Journal of Abnormal Psychology
- Philip Solomon, clinical professor of Psychiatry at Harvard Medical School and physician-in-chief of Psychiatry at Boston City Hospital
- Elmer Ernest Southard, 1901, neuropsychiatrist, headed the Boston Psychopathic Hospital
- David Spiegel, 1971, psychiatrist, professor, associate chair of Psychiatry at Stanford University School of Medicine
- Charles Harrison Stedman, 1828, a founder of the American Psychiatric Association NS superintendent of Boston State Hospital
- George Eman Vaillant, psychiatrist and professor at Harvard Medical School and Director of Research for the Department of Psychiatry, Brigham and Women's Hospital
- Nina Vasan, psychiatrist and author
- Robert J. Waldinger, 1978, psychiatrist who directs the Harvard Study of Adult Development, one of the longest-running studies of adult life ever conducted
- Lyman Wynne, psychiatrist and psychologist with a special interest in schizophrenia

== Religion ==
- Marcus Ames, minister, head of the Lancaster Industrial School for Girls, and chaplain of the state institutions of Rhode Island
- Isaac Pendleton Langworthy, non-degreed, congregational minister
- Robert Traill Spence Lowell, non-degreed, Episcopal clergyman, missionary, inspector of schools for Bermuda, and headmaster of St. Mark's School
- LeRoy S. Wirthlin, president of the Germany Munich Austria Mission of the Church of Jesus Christ of Latter-day Saints

== Science ==
- Vincent Allard, entomologist
- Thomas Mayo Brewer, 1838, naturalist, specializing in ornithology and zoology with the Boston Society of Natural History
- Henry Bryant, 1843, naturalist specializing in ornithology
- Samuel Cabot III, 1839, pioneering surgeon, ornathologist, and field explorer
- Nicholas R. Cozzarelli, 1966, biochemist, DNA researcher, and editor-in-chief of the Proceedings of the National Academy of Sciences
- Robert K. Crane, 1950, biochemist best known for his discovery of sodium–glucose cotransport
- James Freeman Dana, 1817, chemist
- Samuel Luther Dana, 1818, chemist with Newton Chemical Company and the Merrimack Manufacturing Company
- William Gilson Farlow, 1870, botanist and professor known as the "father" of cryptogamic botany in the United States"
- Lydia W. S. Finley, scientist known for her contributions to understanding the metabolic underpinnings of stem cell fate
- Mahlon Hoagland, 1948, biochemist who discovered transfer RNA
- Charles Thomas Jackson, 1829, state geologist of Maine and Rhode Island
- John Charles Phillips, 1904, zoologist, ornithologist, environmentalist, and author
- Charles Pickering, 1826, naturalist, curator, author, and physician
- John Witt Randall, 1811, noted art collector ad consulting zoologist to the United States Exploring Expedition
- Edward Lewis Sturtevant, 1866, agronomist and botanist who wrote Sturtevant's Edible Plants of the World
- Yellapragada Subbarow, biochemist who discovered the function of adenosine triphosphate
- Giovanni J. Ughi, engineer and scientist, one of the inventors of multimodality optical coherence tomography

== Sports ==
- R. G. Acton, head football coach at Vanderbilt University
- Doc Adams, Connecticut House of Representatives and professional baseball player with the New York Knickerbockers
- Mark Adickes, professional football player
- Tenley Albright, 1961, figure skater, 1956 Olympic champion, the 1952 Olympic silver medalist, the 1953, and 1955 World Champion
- José Alvalade, non-degreed, founder and first club member of the multisport club Sporting Clube de Portugal
- Omar Amr, water polo player with the United States national team and the 2004 Summer Olympics
- Thomas Aretz, breaststroke and medley swimmer who competed at the 1968 Summer Olympics and the 1972 Summer Olympics
- Robert Beck, modern pentathlete and fencer who won three gold medals at the Pan American Games and a bronze medal at the 1960 Summer Olympics
- David J. Bradley, New Hampshire House of Representatives, author, and member of the 1940 Winter Olympics ski team
- Pepper Constable, college football player
- Renn Crichlow, sprint kayaker who competed in the 1996 Summer Olympics
- Frank Duffy, equestrian who competed in two events at the 1956 Summer Olympics
- Jernej Godec, 2016, freestyle and butterfly swimmer who competed at the 2004 Summer Olympics and the 2008 Summer Olympics in Beijing
- Scott Goodwin, professional soccer player
- David Guthrie Freeman, 1945, badminton player and inductee in the U.S. and World Badminton Halls of Fame
- William Hoyt, track and field athlete who competed at the 1896 Summer Olympics
- Daniel Hurley, 1909, college football player and All-American in 1904 and 1905
- Andy Larkin, rower who competed in the men's eight event at the 1968 Summer Olympics
- George Lee, 1904, college football player and 1901 College Football All-America Team
- William C. Mackie, 1898, college football player and coach
- Thomas H. Maguire, college football coach
- Judy Melick, competition swimmer who participated as part of the U.S. team at the 1972 Summer Olympics
- Ralph Miller, 1961, alpine ski race whocompeted in three events at the 1956 Winter Olympics
- Fred T. Murphy, college football players at Yale University, 1895 College Football All-America Team, and 1896 College Football All-America Team
- Franklin Nelson, 1961, ice dancer who was the 1956 U.S. national bronze medalist
- Mary O'Neill, fencer who competed in the women's individual and team foil events at the 1988 and 1992 Summer Olympics
- Walter Pritchard, track and field Olympian and cardiologist
- Nate Pulsifer, non-degreed, minor league baseball player and collegiate American football and basketball and coach
- Henry B. Richardson, archer and medalist at the 1904 Summer Olympics
- Victoria Rogers, professional tennis player
- Harry Edward Sears, sport shooter who competed in the 1912 Summer Olympics
- James Simrall, college football player
- Pat Tyrance, 1997, professional football player with Los Angeles Rams
- Joan Ullyot, 1966, runner who won ten marathons, including the masters category at the Boston Marathon in 1984
- Arthur White, 1902, college football coach
- Paul Withington, 1914, college football player and coach
