= Yeu-Tsu Margaret Lee =

Chinese-born American surgeon

- Education: University of South Dakota (1957); Harvard School of Medicine (1961)
- Scientific career
- Fields: Surgical oncology, military medicine, global surgery

Yeu-Tsu Margaret Lee is a Chinese-American surgeon known for her career in military medicine and global surgery.

== Early life ==
Lee was born in China, having fled south from Nanking to Chunking with her family during the world war 2 "Rape of Nanking", where she experienced a challenging upbringing plagued by war and famine. The perilousness of her family's health in the setting of these challenges motivated Lee to pursue a career in medicine. She began her university studies at National Taiwan University before emigrating to the United States to continue her education at University of South Dakota. After completing her undergraduate degree, she was admitted to Harvard Medical School in 1957 as one of four women in her class.She was awarded the 2018 Dr. Mary Edwards Walker award from the American College of Surgeons.

== Career ==
Lee graduated with her doctor of medicine from Harvard Medical School in 1961. She entered residency in general surgery at the University of Michigan School of Medicine before completing her surgical training, including a fellowship in surgical oncology, at the University of Missouri School of Medicine.

Lee began her career as an attending surgeon at the University of Missouri before moving to the University of Southern California. She joined the Army Medical Corps and was hired at Tripler Army Medical Center as Chief of Surgical Oncology in 1983.

Lee volunteered for active deployment as part of Operation Desert Storm in 1990.
