= David M. Eisenberg =

American physician

David M. Eisenberg is an American physician, alternative medicine researcher, and the Bernard Osher Distinguished Associate Professor of Medicine at Harvard Medical School. He is also the founder of the Osher Center for Complementary and Integrative Medical Therapies, a healthcare clinic associated with Brigham and Women's Hospital, and served as its director from 2000 to 2010. He is also the founder of the "Healthy Kitchens/Healthy Lives" initiative, which, according to the New York Times, aims "to tear down the firewall between “healthy” and “ crave-able” cuisine."

== Early life and education ==
Eisenberg grew up on Long Island, the son of a baker father and a lawyer mother. He attended Harvard College and Harvard Medical School. In 1979, while a student at Harvard Medical School, he became the first American to travel to China on a medical exchange program.

== Research ==
Eisenberg is known for a study he published in the New England Journal of Medicine, which found that one in three Americans used some kind of alternative medical treatment.

== Personal life ==
Eisenberg enjoys baking, which he first became interested in as a child helping prepare food in his father's bakery. He is married to Rabbi Elaine S. Zecher and has three children, Jacob, Benjamin, and Naomi.
