= Melinda Wharton =

American epidemiologist

Melinda Wharton is an American epidemiologist. She was acting director for the Immunization Division in the Centers for Disease Control.

== Career ==
She graduated from Harvard Medical School and Johns Hopkins School of Hygiene and Public Health.

She is associate director for vaccine policy, at the National Center for Immunization and Respiratory Diseases. She was elected a Fellow of the American Association for the Advancement of Science in 2015.

== Works ==
- Wharton, M.; Spiegel, R. A.; Horan, J. M.; Tauxe, R. V.; Wells, J. G.; Barg, N.; Herndon, J.; Meriwether, R. A.; MacCormack, J. N.; Levine, R. H. (1990-12-01). "A Large Outbreak of Antibiotic-Resistant Shigellosis at a Mass Gathering". Journal of Infectious Diseases. 162 (6). Oxford University Press (OUP): 1324–1328. doi:10.1093/infdis/162.6.1324. ISSN 0022-1899. PMID 2230262.
- Wallender, Erika; Peacock, Georgina; Wharton, Melinda; Walensky, Rochelle P. (2023-07-20). "Uninsured and Not Immune — Closing the Vaccine-Coverage Gap for Adults". New England Journal of Medicine. 389 (3). Massachusetts Medical Society: 193–195. doi:10.1056/nejmp2306200. ISSN 0028-4793. PMID 37342958.
- "Routine Childhood Vaccination in the Time of COVID-19: An Urgent Call to Action" (PDF). 13 November 2020.
