= Yolanda George-David =

Nigerian Medical doctor and on air personality

- Born: Yolanda George; New York City, United States
- Education: Harvard Medical School; University of Pittsburgh
- Occupations: Medical Doctor, Radio Host, Humanitarian and Human Right activist.
- Years active: 2005–present

Yolanda George-David also known as Aunt Landa, is a known Nigerian medical doctor, radio host (OAP) and humanitarian. She specializes in Neurosurgery and was named a Vlisco Ambassador in 2018.

== Early life and education ==
Yolanda started her humanitarian work at the age of sixteen. She graduated from the University of Pittsburgh, before proceeding to the Harvard Medical School where she was trained as a neurosurgeon. She had her primary residency in obstetrics and gynaecology, and clinical and relational psychologist with a concentration in child development.

== Career ==
As a humanitarian, Yolanda has helped counselled and empower over 25,000 sexually abused teenagers and has equipped them with key vocational and life skills through the Aunt Landa’s Bethel Foundation. Her work include rehabilitating prostitutes and sexually abused children as well as fighting for the oppressed. Yolanda is also a host of radio shows such as 'Being Real with Aunt Landa' and 'Sharing Life Issues Weekend Special with Aunt Landa' both on 92.3 Inspiration FM.

== Vlisco Ambassador ==
In 2018, Yolanda was named a Vlisco Nigerian ambassador in recognition of her contributions to improving humanity and livelihood of the underprivileged.

== Personal life ==
Yolanda is a Christian and she is married to David, a cardiologist of the Aunt Landa’s Bethel Foundation.
