= John Reinisch =

American plastic surgeon

John Reinisch is an American physician specializing in plastic surgery. Reinisch helped to develop the Medpor method of ear reconstruction for treatment of microtia. He founded the division of plastic surgery at Children's Hospital Los Angeles in 1983 and was also chairman of the division of plastic surgery at the University of Southern California, where he remains on the faculty. He is currently the director of Craniofacial and Pediatric Plastic Surgery at Cedars-Sinai Medical Center and a plastic surgeon at Cedars-Sinai Medical Group. He is also director of the Center for Ear Reconstruction.
