= Eugene Fuller =

American surgeon

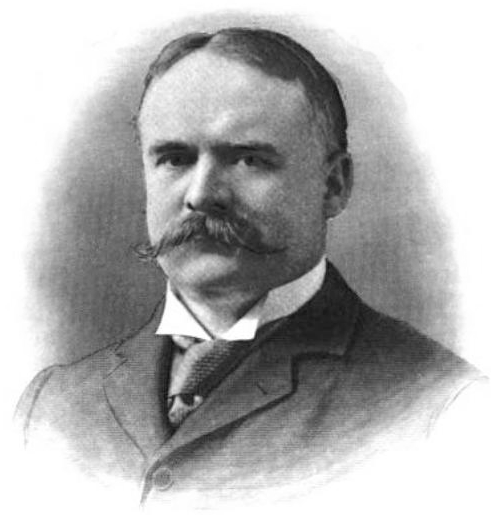
- Born: May 8, 1858; Wayland, Massachusetts
- Died: June 4, 1930 (aged 72); Seattle, Washington
- Education: Harvard Medical School
- Occupation: Surgeon

Signature
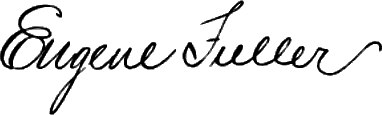

Eugene Fuller (May 8, 1858 – June 4, 1930) was an American surgeon and pioneer of the procedure of suprapubic prostatectomy.

== Biography ==
Eugene Fuller was born in Wayland, Massachusetts on May 8, 1858. He earned an A.B. degree from Harvard College, and graduated from Harvard Medical School.

He died in Seattle on June 4, 1930.
