= Emanuel Rubin =

American pathologist (1928–2021)

- Born: Emanuel Rubin; December 5, 1928; Brooklyn, New York, United States
- Died: February 13, 2021 (aged 92); Gladwyne, Pennsylvania, United States
- Education: Villanova University(B.S., 1950); Harvard Medical School(M.D., 1954)
- Known for: Pathology research and Education; Alcoholic tissue damage; Liver and heart disease
- Scientific career
- Fields: Pathology; Biochemistry; Biophysics
- Workplaces: Villanova University, PA; Harvard University; Medical School, MA; Mt. Sinai School of; Medicine, NY; Drexel University; Medical School, PA; Thomas Jefferson University, PA

Emanuel Rubin (December 5, 1928 – February 13, 2021) was an American pathologist known for his contributions to the study of liver disease, cardiomyopathy and alcoholic tissue injury, and as the editor of Rubin’s Pathology, a medical textbook first published in 1988, now in its eighth edition.

== Early life and education ==
Dr. Rubin obtained a B.S. degree from Villanova University in 1950, and an M.D. degree from Harvard Medical School in 1954. He served as an officer in the U.S. Navy from 1955 to 1957. Subsequently, he trained in pathology at the Mount Sinai Hospital from 1958 to 1962. He was married twice, and had six children.

== Career ==
Rubin joined the attending staff of Mt. Sinai Hospital in 1962. He was appointed Professor of Pathology in 1968, and Chairman of the department in 1972, at Mt. Sinai School of Medicine. In 1977, he moved to Philadelphia, where he was Chairman of Pathology at Drexel University Medical School. In 1986, he transferred to the Jefferson Medical College at Thomas Jefferson University. He was also appointed Adjunct Professor of Biochemistry and Biophysics at the University of Pennsylvania School of Medicine in 1987. In 2004, Rubin was named Distinguished Professor of Pathology, Anatomy and Cell Biology and Chairman Emeritus of the Jefferson Department.

Rubin has authored numerous original contributions in the fields of liver disease, cardiomyopathy and alcoholic tissue injury. His work has been based on clinical studies of patients, volunteers and laboratory investigations of the effects of alcohol on cells and organs. Rubin originally demonstrated that primary biliary cirrhosis is an inflammatory lesion of bile ducts. His early work refuted concept that liver disease in alcoholics is caused by nutritional deficiencies, which led to the erroneous term “nutritional cirrhosis”. In rodents, sub-human primates and human volunteers he showed that excessive alcohol consumption is toxic to the liver independent of nutritional factors, a fact that serves as the basis of alcohol research today. Subsequently, Rubin and colleagues demonstrated the profound effects of alcohol on cell membranes, mitochondria, and other cell constituents. In a series of papers, together with co-workers in Spain, he determined that (1) alcoholic cardiomyopathy correlated with the lifetime dose of alcohol, (2) women were more susceptible to the cardiac effects of alcohol, and (3) alcoholic liver and heart diseases occurred concurrently.

Rubin was the founder and editor of Rubin’s Pathology, a textbook first published in 1988, now in its eighth edition.

== Awards and honors ==
- American Medical Writer's Award for Best Medical Textbook of the Year, 1989
- Doctor Honoris Causa, University of Barcelona, Spain, 1994
- The F.K. Mostofi Distinguished Service Award of U.S.-Canadian Academy of Pathology, 1996
- National Institutes of Health (NIH) MERIT Award, Bethesda, MD, 1996-2006
- Tom Kent Award for Excellence in Pathology Education, Group for Research in Pathology Education (GRIPE), 2001
- Distinguished Service Award, Association of Pathology Chairs, 2006
- Gold Medal Award, International Academy of Pathology, 2006
- Gold-headed Cane Award (research), American Society for Investigative Pathology, 2006
- Lifetime Achievement Award, Research Society on Alcoholism, 2015
- Robbins Distinguished Educator Award, American Society for Investigative Pathology, 2018
- Doctor Honoris Causa, Republic of Italy, 2003
- Lifetime Scientific Achievement Award, Sbarro Health Research Organization, 2004
- Honorary Distinguished Member of Faculty Award, The Hebrew University of Jerusalem, 2020

== Selected publications ==
- Advances in the biology of disease. Rubin, E. and Damjanov. I., eds., Williams & Wilkins, Baltimore, Md., 1984.
- Alcohol and the cell, Rubin, E., Ed., Ann. NY Acad. Sci., New York, Vol. 492, 1987.
- Rubin's pathology, Editions 1–8, Lippincott-Williams and Wilkins, 1988–2015.
- Pathology reviews, 1989, Rubin, E. and Damjanov, I., eds., Humana Press, Clifton, N.J., 1989.
- Pathology: a study guide, Damjanov, I. and Rubin, E.: J.B. Lippincott Co., Philadelphia, Pa., 1990, 1995.
- Essentials of Rubin's pathology, Editions 1–6, Lippincott-Williams and Wilkins, 1990–2014.
- Molecular and cellular mechanisms of alcohol and anesthetics. Rubin, E., Miller, K.W. and Roth, S.H., eds., Ann. New York Academy of Sciences, New York, Vol. 625, 1991.
- Review of pathology. Damjanov, I. and Rubin, E.: J.B. Lippincott Co., Philadelphia, Pa., 1994.
- Pathology study guide: learning objectives with short answers. Damjanov, I., Fenderson B.A., Rubin, E. eds., Thomas Jefferson University, Philadelphia, PA, 1997.
- Illustrated Q & A review of Rubin's pathology. 2nd ed., Fenderson, D.A., Strayer, D.S., Rubin, R. and Rubin, E., Lippincott-Williams and Wilkins, 2011.
- Principles of Rubin's pathology, 7th Ed., Rubin, E. and Reisner, H. Ed., Lippincott-Williams and Wilkins, 2018.
