= Taine Pechet =

American thoracic surgeon

- Citizenship: American
- Education: Harvard University (M.D.)
- Occupations: Thoracic and Cardiac Surgery
- Known for: Thoracic Surgery

Taine Pechet is a thoracic surgeon and Chief of Surgery at the University of Pennsylvania's Presbyterian Medical Center. Pechet has made substantial contributions to the field of thoracic surgery. He resides in Philadelphia, Pennsylvania.

== Education ==
- Harvard Medical School, Class of 1992
- Brigham and Women's Hospital, Residency, General Surgery, 1992–1999
- Washington University School of Medicine, Fellowship, Thoracic Surgery, 1999–2001

== Areas of specialization ==
Pechet specializes in lung cancer, lung surgery, video assisted thoracic surgery (vats), palliative care.

== Board certifications ==
Pechet is board certified in the following areas:

- Surgery, 2000
- Thoracic and Cardiac Surgery, 2002

== Awards ==
Pechet was recognized:

- In Philadelphia Magazine's 2011-2016 Top Docs issues
- By America's Top Doctors (2013, 2014)

== Other appointments ==
Pechet is currently Chief of Surgery at Penn Presbyterian Medical Center. He sees patients there and at Penn Medicine Cherry Hill, in Cherry Hill NJ.
