= William Sharpe (surgeon) =

American brain surgeon

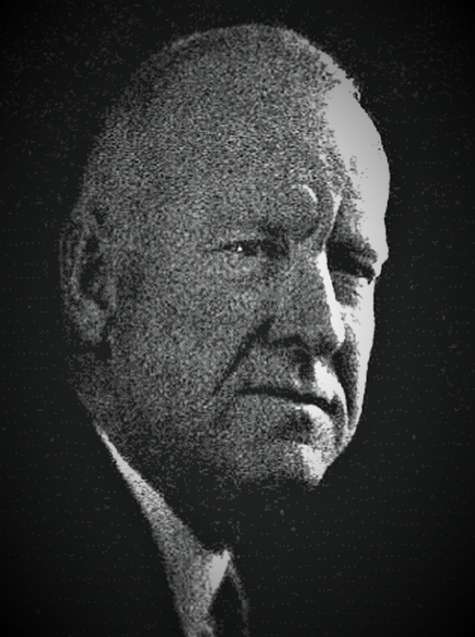
William Sharpe

William Sharpe (c. 1882–1960) was a brain surgeon who developed treatment for retardation and palsy in children.

In 1948 he donated 1,500 acres of land to The Fresh Air Fund. That donation became part of the Sharpe Reservation, a heavily wooded nature reserve in Fishkill, New York, which eventually expanded to 3,000 acres.

Sharpe, who wrote an autobiography at age 70, served as the first president of the Pan-American Medical Association. He died at age 77, having retired and moved to Florida with his wife.

He graduated from Harvard College and Harvard Medical School.

== Education ==
William Sharpe entered Harvard College in 1900. In 1903, he spent a year at the University of Berlin. He graduated from Harvard College in 1904. He was then admitted to Harvard Medical School, where he studied under Professor of Physiology Walter Cannon, Professor of Pathology Reginald Fitz, and Professor of Hematology Richard Cabot. During his second year, he studied under Professor of Anatomy Thomas Dwight. He received his doctorate in 1908.
