= William Bacon Carey =

American pediatrician and child temperament researcher (1926–2020)

- Born: December 6, 1926; Philadelphia, Pennsylvania, U.S.
- Died: July 26, 2020 (aged 93); Philadelphia, Pennsylvania, U.S.
- Citizenship: American
- Education: Yale University, Harvard Medical School
- Organizations: Children's Hospital of Philadelphia, University of Pennsylvania
- Known for: Child temperament research, developmental-behavioral pediatrics
- Awards: Aldrich Award in Child Development (1991), Practitioner Research Award (1992)
- Medical career
- Field: Pediatrics, developmental-behavioral pediatrics

William Bacon Carey (December 6, 1926 – July 26, 2020) was an American pediatrician, researcher, medical educator, author, and editor. He was a clinical professor of pediatrics at the University of Pennsylvania and practiced at the Children's Hospital of Philadelphia (CHOP) for nearly six decades. His research focused on child temperament and its relationship to pediatric behavioral development. He also served as an editor or co-editor for all four editions of the textbook Developmental-Behavioral Pediatrics.

== Early life and education ==
Carey was born in the Germantown neighborhood of Philadelphia, Pennsylvania, to Margaret Howell Bacon and Henry Reginald Carey.

He attended Milton Academy and graduated from Yale University with a bachelor's degree in American studies. He earned his M.D. from Harvard Medical School in 1954.

Following pediatric residency training at the Children's Hospital of Philadelphia, Carey served as a captain in the United States Army Medical Corps in Arizona from 1957 to 1959.

== Career ==
In 1959, Carey joined the faculty as an assistant instructor in pediatrics at the Children's Hospital of Philadelphia (CHOP). He was appointed to the clinical faculty track in 1979 and subsequently became a clinical professor of pediatrics. He also maintained a private pediatric practice in Media, Pennsylvania, and served on the medical staff of Riddle Memorial Hospital.

Carey taught medical students, pediatric residents, and fellows at CHOP and the University of Pennsylvania Perelman School of Medicine for 58 years. At Penn, his work included the mentorship of pediatric fellows pursuing specialized careers in developmental-behavioral pediatrics.

Throughout his career, Carey was involved in the emerging field of developmental-behavioral pediatrics, focusing on the interplay between innate behavioral tendencies and clinical management. He held editorial advisory positions with several journals, including the International Journal of Behavioral Development, the Journal of Applied Developmental Psychology, Clinical Pediatrics, and Pediatrics in Review.

== Research on temperament ==
Beginning in the 1960s, Carey investigated individual differences in infant and child temperament. His work emphasized the assessment of individual differences in behavioral style and the relationship between temperament and a child's immediate environment. His research contributed to the development and refinement of parent-report measures of temperament across infancy and childhood, helping integrate standardized temperament assessment into pediatric practice and clinical research.

Working alongside psychologists and researchers, including Sean C. McDevitt, Carey authored a suite of standardized parent-report instruments:

- Infant Temperament Questionnaire (ITQ): Developed in 1970 for infants aged 4 to 8 months, and revised in 1978 (R-ITQ) with expanded psychometric standardization.
- Behavioral Style Questionnaire (BSQ): Designed for children aged 3 to 7 years.
- Toddler Temperament Scale (TTS): Designed for children aged 1 to 3 years.
- Middle Childhood Temperament Questionnaire (MCTQ): Co-authored for children aged 8 to 12 years.
- Early Infancy Temperament Questionnaire (EITQ): Co-authored for infants aged 1 to 4 months.

Carey argued that normal variations in child temperament should be distinguished from medical or psychological pathology to prevent unnecessary clinical intervention. He also evaluated primary care screening methodologies, contending that developmental and behavioral screening could be efficiently integrated into routine pediatric practice.

=== Attention-deficit/hyperactivity disorder ===
Carey wrote commentaries regarding the diagnostic criteria and treatment paradigms for attention-deficit/hyperactivity disorder (ADHD). In a 1999 article in Pediatrics, he discussed diagnostic complexities surrounding activity and attention variations in primary care settings.

In 2000, he evaluated the outcomes of the Multimodal Treatment Study of Children with ADHD (MTA Study), cautioning against interpretations that positioned stimulant medication as a sole intervention without accounting for individual behavioral and environmental variations.

== Editorial work ==
Carey served as an editor or co-editor for all four editions of the reference textbook Developmental-Behavioral Pediatrics, first published by W. B. Saunders in 1983:

- 1. Levine, Melvin D.; Carey, William B.; Crocker, Allen C.; Gross, Ruth T., eds. (1983). Developmental-Behavioral Pediatrics (1st ed.). Philadelphia: W. B. Saunders.
- 2. Levine, Melvin D.; Carey, William B.; Crocker, Allen C., eds. (1992). Developmental-Behavioral Pediatrics (2nd ed.). Philadelphia: Saunders.
- 3. Levine, Melvin D.; Carey, William B.; Crocker, Allen C., eds. (1999). Developmental-Behavioral Pediatrics (3rd ed.). Philadelphia: Saunders. ISBN 0-7216-7154-3.
- 4. Carey, William B.; Crocker, Allen C.; Coleman, William L.; Elias, Ellen Roy; Feldman, Heidi M., eds. (2009). Developmental-Behavioral Pediatrics (4th ed.). Philadelphia: Saunders/Elsevier.

== Honors and recognition ==
- Elected Member, Institute of Medicine (now the National Academy of Medicine) (1983)
- C. Anderson Aldrich Award in Child Development, American Academy of Pediatrics (1991)
- Practitioner Research Award, American Academy of Pediatrics (1992)

== Personal life and death ==
Carey married Ann Lord McDougal in 1956; the couple had three daughters and resided in Swarthmore, Pennsylvania.

Carey died of congestive heart failure at Cathedral Village in Philadelphia on July 26, 2020, at the age of 93.

== Legacy ==
Carey's contributions helped formalize assessment protocols in developmental-behavioral pediatrics and advanced clinical understanding of child temperament. He authored a historical retrospective on the development of the discipline in 2003.

== Selected works ==
=== Books ===
- Carey, William B.; Jablow, Martha M. (1997). Understanding Your Child's Temperament. New York: Macmillan. ISBN 978-0028616643.
- Carey, William B.; McDevitt, Sean C. (1995). Coping with Children's Temperament: A Guide for Professionals. New York: Basic Books. ISBN 978-0465014323.
- Carey, William B.; McDevitt, Sean C., eds. (1994). Prevention and Early Intervention: Individual Differences as Risk Factors for the Mental Health of Children. New York: Brunner/Mazel. 978-0876307236.

=== Selected journal articles ===
- Carey, William B. (1970). "A simplified method for measuring infant temperament." The Journal of Pediatrics, 77(2): 188–194. doi:10.1016/S0022-3476(70)80322-5
- Carey, William B. (1978). "On doing research in office practice." Pediatrics, 62(3): 424–425. doi:10.1542/peds.62.3.424
- Carey, William B.; McDevitt, Sean C. (1978). "Revision of the Infant Temperament Questionnaire." Pediatrics, 61(5): 735–739. doi:10.1542/peds.61.5.735
- McDevitt, Sean C.; Carey, William B. (1978). "The measurement of temperament in 3–7 year old children." Journal of Child Psychology and Psychiatry, 19(3): 245–253. doi:10.1111/j.1469-7610.1978.tb00467.x
- Fullard, William; McDevitt, Sean C.; Carey, William B. (1984). "Assessing temperament in one- to three-year-old children." Journal of Pediatric Psychology, 9(2): 205–217. doi:10.1093/jpepsy/9.2.205
- Medoff-Cooper, Barbara; Carey, William B.; McDevitt, Sean C. (1993). "The Early Infancy Temperament Questionnaire." Journal of Developmental and Behavioral Pediatrics, 14(4): 230–235. PMID 8408665
- Carey, William B. (1999). "Problems in diagnosing attention and activity." Pediatrics, 103(3): 664–666. doi:10.1542/peds.103.3.664
- Carey, William B. (2000). "What the Multimodal Treatment Study of Children With Attention-Deficit/Hyperactivity Disorder Did and Did Not Say About the Use of Methylphenidate for Attention Deficits." Pediatrics, 105(4): 863–864. doi:10.1542/peds.105.4.863
