= Leonard B. Kaban =

American surgeon and academic

Leonard B. Kaban, D.M.D., M.D., F.A.C.S. is the Walter C. Guralnick Professor and Chair of the Department of Oral and Maxillofacial Surgery at the Massachusetts General Hospital/Harvard University.

== Biography ==
=== Education ===
Kaban received both his doctor of dental medicine (D.M.D.) and doctor of medicine (M.D.) degrees from Harvard University. He completed his residency training in general surgery/oral and maxillofacial surgery at the Massachusetts General Hospital.

=== Career ===
He remained in Boston following the completion of his training and was an integral part of the Craniofacial Centre at Boston Children's Hospital between 1973 and 1984. He subsequently was the Chair of the Department of Oral and Maxillofacial Surgery at the University of California, San Francisco, before returning to Harvard in 1994.

Kaban has received intramural and extramural funding for research projects that have led to publication of approximately 250 articles in peer-reviewed journals, numerous abstract presentations, and three textbooks related to complications in oral and maxillofacial surgery and pediatric oral and maxillofacial surgery.
