= Rainu Kaushal =

American information scientist and health services researcher

- Spouse(s): Her husband's name is Sekhar Upadhyayula. He runs his own practice called PainSolutions, and specializes in Anesthesiology.
- Children: She has twin children named Amartha and Achintha born in 2012

Academic background
- Education: BSc, University of Vermont; MD, Harvard Medical School; M.P.H., Harvard T.H. Chan School of Public Health
- Thesis: Characterization of betacellulin: a novel mitogen from pancreatic beta cell tumors

Academic work
- Institutions: Weill Cornell Medicine

Rainu Kaushal is an American information scientist and health services researcher. She is the Senior Associate Dean of Clinical Research, Chair of the Department of Population Health Sciences, and the Nanette Laitman Distinguished Professor of Population Health Sciences at Weill Cornell Medicine. She is also the Physician-in-Chief of Population Health Sciences at New York-Presbyterian Hospital/Weill Cornell Medical Center.

== Early life and education ==
Kaushal completed her Bachelor of Science degree at the University of Vermont before enrolling at Harvard University for her graduate studies. She completed her medical degree at Harvard Medical School and her Master's of Public Health at Harvard T.H. Chan School of Public Health.

== Career ==
In 2005, Kaushal founded and became the executive director of HITEC (Health Information Technology Evaluation Collaborative) in conjunction with HEAL NY. She subsequently joined the faculty at Weill Cornell Medicine and NewYork-Presbyterian Hospital in 2006. Upon joining the faculty, Kaushal also became the founding chief of a new Division of Quality and Medical Informatics in the Departments of Pediatrics and Public Health at Weill Cornell. While serving as the Frances and John L. Loeb Professor of Medical Informatics and chief of the Division of Quality and Medical Informatics, Kaushal was named the director of the Center for Healthcare Informatics and Policy (CHiP).

In December 2013, Kaushal was named chair of the Department of Healthcare Policy and Research at Weill Cornell Medical College and physician-in-chief of healthcare policy and research at NewYork-Presbyterian/Weill Cornell Medical Center. Following this appointment, she was selected as a Fellow of the Hedwig van Ameringen Executive Leadership in Academic Medicine program at Drexel University College of Medicine. In 2015, Kaushal was appointed to serve on the National Patient-Centered Clinical Research Network Steering Committee. Her efforts were later recognized by Crain Communications as being one of their 2018 Notable Women in Health Care in New York City. As a result of her "achievements and exceptional service in medical sciences, health care, and public health," Kaushal was elected a member of the National Academy of Medicine in 2019.

In 2020, Kaushal was appointed senior associate dean for clinical research at Weill Cornell Medicine. In this role, she was expected to lead Weill Cornell Medicine’s clinical research enterprise, which oversees the experimental application and comparative investigations of new medicines, technologies, interventions and healthcare delivery models to patients. During the COVID-19 pandemic, she used her role as principal investigator of INSIGHT Clinical Research Network to create a city-wide surveillance database for information of suspected and diagnosed COVID-19 patients to be used in analytical inquiries and research.
