= Steve Hoffmann =

American physician and writer

Stephen "Steve" Hoffmann (born February 1, 1955) is an American physician and the author of Under the Etherdome, an autobiography pertaining to his experience at Harvard Medical School. Hoffmann's book was featured on the Today Show in 1989 when Stephen made a guest appearance on the show. Stephen began his medical career at the Massachusetts General Hospital in Boston, MA. As a young resident intern Steve had a frictional relationship with the Chief of Staff. He eventually left the Massachusetts General hospital and began practicing privately, where the majority of his work is done currently.

Hoffmann has spent considerable time reviewing medical lawsuits and working as an expert witness. He specializes in Infectious Disease, and has a record of excellence in helping win cases. He has yet to lose a case that he has reviewed and served on.
