= Lawrence Hartmann =

American psychiatrist and activist

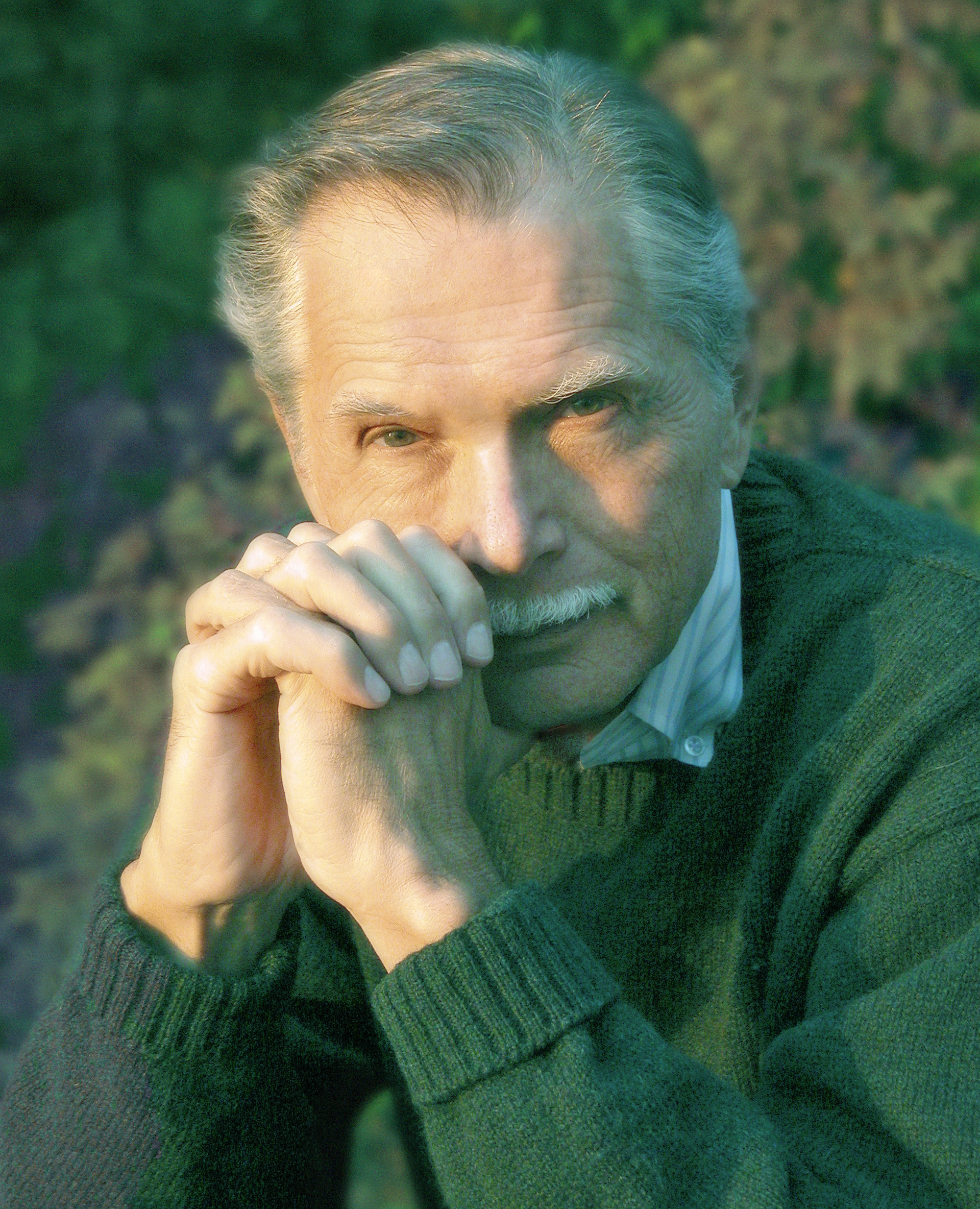
Lawrence Hartmann (2002)

Lawrence Hartmann is an American child and adult psychiatrist, social-psychiatric activist, clinician, professor, and former President of the American Psychiatric Association (APA) Cf 2 below). Hartmann played a central role in the APA's 1973 decision to remove homosexuality as a diagnosis of mental illness from its Diagnostic and Statistical Manual (cf Drescher 2007, below). This change decisively changed the modern era of LGBTQ rights by providing support for the overturning of laws and prejudices against homosexuals and by advancing gay civil rights, including the right to immigrate, to adopt, to buy a home, to teach, to marry, and to be left alone.

== Family and early life ==
Hartmann grew up in New York City. He was born in Vienna, Austria in 1937 into a prominent family of intellectuals, professors, and social reformers. Hartmann's early years were unsettled by the annexation of Austria by Nazi Germany, and his family's consequent emigration from Vienna to Paris in 1938, to Switzerland in 1939, and to New York City in 1941. His father was Heinz Hartmann (1894–1970), an internationally known psychiatrist and psychoanalyst, as well as a student and analysand of Sigmund Freud's.

== Education and academic and clinical career ==
Hartmann was educated at the Fieldston School in New York City and then at Harvard College, where he received a B.A. in History and Literature (magna cum laude, Phi Beta Kappa). As a Rhodes Scholar, Hartmann earned two degrees in English Literature from Oxford University. He received an M.D. from Harvard Medical School and then served as an intern in pediatrics at the University of California in San Francisco. He served his residency in psychiatry (1965–1967) and a fellowship in child psychiatry (1967–1969) at the Massachusetts Mental Health Center (MMHC), a Harvard Teaching Hospital. He was psychoanalyzed from 1966 until 1971. Upon completion of his training, Hartmann began a private practice with adults, adolescents, and children; ran a child and adolescent psychiatry clinic and a school consultation program; and, for about 50 years, taught, and served as a clinical professor of psychiatry, at Harvard Medical School, mostly at MMHC and later mostly at Cambridge Hospital. He has written on such topics as child psychotherapy, dirty words, ethics, play, apartheid, torture, skepticism, and biopsychosocial integration.

== Public career ==
Hartmann's activism and interest in complex psychiatic issues and biopsychosocial integration led him to be elected a member of the APA Assembly and subsequently Speaker of the Assembly before being elected Area Trustee, Vice President (1990) and then President of the APA (1991–1992). (Cf. Sabshin ,2, below)

Alongside his 50-year career spent predominantly treating adult, adolescent, and child patients, and doing clinical medical school teaching at Harvard, and running the child and adolescent clinic at Mass. Mental Health Center, and starting a school mental health consultation service, Hartmann had an unusually active public psychiatric career, over several decades, often in or through the APA or other psychiatric or medical organizations. (Cf. Sabshin 1992 and Drescher 2007).

After the APA was non-responsive to its membership in 1970 about psychiatric issues concerning Cambodia and Kent State, Hartmann joined several other young colleagues to form the Committee for Concerned Psychiatrists, in 1970. The CFCP rapidly, and with wide APA membership support, changed APA leadership and ByLaws; helped find, and get elected, well-known and reform-minded candidates for APA President and Trustees ; and moved the APA in the 1970s to a less guild-oriented and more biopsychosocial mental-health-and-mental-illness-oriented association (Cf. Drescher 2007).

Hartmann helped, nationally and locally, to define and write and get the APA to consider, and then officially to pass, the widely influential 1973 De-Pathologizing of Homosexuality. (Cf. Drescher 2007, Hartmann 2025)

Hartmann served on and chaired many APA ( and APA Assembly) Committees and Councils , and a few Boards, for about 35 years. (Cf. Sabshin 1992 and Cf. APA Directories of Components 1974-2006) . He also served as President of the American Association for Social Psychiatry (AASP) and of the New England Council of Child and Adolescent Psychiatry (NECCAP). He was a founder of the American Psychiatric Press, and of The American Psychiatric Foundation

He went to Saudi Arabia for the APA, in the 1980s, as a visiting professor and consultant in psychiatry. He went to South Africa during the final years of Apartheid on a health and human rights mission (sponsored by APA, IOM, AAAS, and APHA). (Cf. Nightingale 1990). He went to Chile on a health and human rights mission during the Pinochet dictatorship . (Cf. Hartmann 1992a). He worked with the World Psychiatric Association , and went to the Soviet Union to help document and end ,Russia’s abuse of psychiatry and of political dissidents. (Cf. Drescher 2007 and Hartmann 1992a). He helped design, and then went to China as a co-leader of, a pioneering APA-Chinese Medical Association scientific meeting in 1988. (Cf. APA BOT minutes 1988). After the Iron Curtain fell in 1989, when requests came from large organizations and universities in Poland, Czechoslovakia, and Hungary to many in the West for long-neglected connections and help with psychiatric education , Hartmann helped invent, negotiate, fund, and create ---and then lead--- a post-iron-curtain APA travelling department of psychiatry, staffed by leading American psychiatric clinicians, researchers, editors, and teachers. That travelling department went to those three countries for several weeks in 1992. (Cf. APA BOT minutes for 1992).

More locally, he served on the Board, and then for some years, ending in 2020, chaired the Board, of the Community Therapeutic Day School , in Lexington, Massachusetts.

Among his awards, Hartmann received the APA Human Rights Award , and was made honorary member of the French Federation of Psychiatrists, the Czech Psychiatric Association, and the Hungarian Medical Association. In Prague, he was given the Charles University Medallion.

Much more recently, in 2014, following many years of cooperative work, Hartmann was made Honorary Member of the Boston Psychoanalytic Society and Institute, (Cf. BPSI website and BPSI 2014 newsletters). In 2024, he was given the Yale Medical School Award for Advocacy in Mental Health and Mental Illness. (Cf. Yale Medical School website, 2024).

== Personal life ==
Hartmann has lived with Brian Pfeiffer, an architectural historian, in Cambridge, Massachusetts since 1973. They married in 2004 when Massachusetts became the first state in the nation to grant full civil rights for same-sex marriage.

== Selected bibliography ==
- Hartmann, Lawrence (1973). "Some Uses of Dirty Words by Children". Journal of the American Academy of Child Psychiatry. 12 (1): 108–122. doi:10.1097/00004583-197301000-00008. PMID 4683861.
- Hartmann, L. & Hanson, G. (1986), Child psychotherapy. In: Current Psychiatric Therapies, ed. J. Masserman. New York: Grune and Stratton, pp. 29–43.
- Nightingale, E. O.; Hannibal, K.; Geiger, H. J.; Hartmann, L.; Lawrence, R.; Spurlock, J. (1990). "Apartheid medicine. Health and human rights in South Africa". JAMA: The Journal of the American Medical Association. 264 (16): 2097–2102. doi:10.1001/jama.264.16.2097. PMID 2214078.
- Hartmann, L. (1991). "Humane values and biopsychosocial integration". American Journal of Psychiatry. 148 (9): 1130–1134. doi:10.1176/ajp.148.9.1130. PMID 1882988.
- {Hartmann, L. (1992a), Some social psychiatric problems in Chile, South Africa and the Soviet Union. In: Psychiatry and World Accords, ed. J. Masserman. New York, Gardner, pp. 5–15.
- Hartmann, L. (1992). "Reflections on humane values and biopsychosocial integration". American Journal of Psychiatry. 149 (9): 1134–1141. doi:10.1176/ajp.149.9.1134. PMID 1503124.
- Doerr-Zegers, Otto; Hartmann, Lawrence; Lira, Elizabeth; Weinstein, Eugenia. (1992b). "Torture : Psychiatric Sequelae and Phenomenology". Psychiatry 55 (2) : 177-184. doi:10 1080/0032747. 1992, 11024591 PMID 1603893 .
- Hartmann, Lawrence (1994). "Heinz Hartmann". The Psychoanalytic Study of the Child. 49: 3–11. doi:10.1080/00797308.1994.11823047. PMID 7809291.
- Hanson, G. & Hartmann, L. (1996), Latency development in prehomosexual boys. In: Textbook of Homosexuality and Mental Health, ed. R.P. Cabaj & T.S. Stein. Washington, DC: American Psychiatric Press, pp. 253–266.
- Hartmann, L. (1996), Foreword. In: Textbook of Homosexuality and Mental Health, ed. R.P. Cabaj & T.S. Stein. Washington, DC: American Psychiatric Press, pp. xxv–xxxi.
- Hartmann, Lawrence (1998). "Children are left out". Am. J. Forensic Psychiatry. 19 (3): 33–44.
- Hartmann, L. (1998). "Eros in a gay dyad: A discussion". Gender & Psychoanalysis. 3 (3): 361–371.
- Hartmann, Lawrence; Meyerson, Arthur (1998). "A Debate on Physician-Assisted Suicide". Psychiatric Services. 49 (11): 1468–1474. doi:10.1176/ps.49.11.1468. PMID 9826250.
- Hartmann, L. (2001), "Confidentiality". In Ethics Primer of the American Psychiatric Association, ed. D. Langsley. Washington, DC: American Psychiatric Press, pp. 39–45.
- Hartmann, Lawrence (2003). "Too flawed. Don't publish: A commentary on Spitzer and changing sexual orientation". Archives of Sexual Behavior. 32: 436–438.
- Hartmann, Lawrence (2015). "Koryagin, suspicious of glasnost, recounts ongoing Soviet abuses". Psychiatric Times: 52. Hartmann, Lawrence (2025) : De-Pathologizing Homosexuality, 50th Anniversary Notes on December, 1973. Psychoanalytic Inquiry, June 10, 2025, vol 45 #6, pp505–511, DOI: 101080/07351690.2025.2508670
- Nightingale, Elena O. (1990). "Apartheid Medicine". JAMA. 264 (16): 2097. doi:10.1001/jama.1990.03450160067031.

== Additional references ==
- American Psychoanalytic Association. Press Release: APsaA Issues Overdue Apology to LGBTQ Community. June 21, 2019. https://apsa.org/content/news-apsaa-issues-overdue-apology-lgbtq-community
- American Academy of Child and Adolescent Psychiatry, Lawrence Hartmann, M.D., Life Member's Report, June, 2012. https://www.aacap.org/aacap/Life_Members/Reports/2012/Hartmann_201206.aspx
- Bayer, R. Homosexuality and American Psychiatry: The Politics of Diagnosis. New York: Basic Books; New York, NY, USA: 1981.
- Drescher, J. and J. P. Merlino, ed. American psychiatry and Homosexuality: An Oral History. Chapter 3: An Interview with Lawrence Hartmann, MD. Routledge: 2007. (Available free online : Google "Researchgate Lawrence Hartmann interview")
- Drescher J., Merlino J.P., editors. American Psychiatry and Homosexuality: An Oral History. Routledge; New York, NY, USA: 2007.
- Levin, Aaron. Global Initiative on Psychiatry. Psychiatric News, Vol. 48, Issue 3, p 12. https://psychnews.psychiatryonline.org/doi/pdf/10.1176/pn.2013.48.issue-3
- Spiegel, Alix. 81 Words: The Story of how the American Psychiatric Association decided in 1973 that homosexuality was no longer a mental illness. This American Life, 204: January 18, 2002. https://www.thisamericanlife.org/204/81-words
- 5) Nightingale, Elena et al (1990): "Apartheid Medicine", JAMA 264 (16) : 2097-2102
- 6) Hartmann, L. (1992a) "Some Social Psychiatric Problems" in Psychiatry and World Accords, ed J. Masserman, New York, Gardner, 5-15
