= Daniel Feikin =

American epidemiologist

Daniel R. Feikin (born c. 1965) is an American epidemiologist. He specializes in the epidemiology of infectious diseases in developing countries. He currently serves as Director of Epidemiology at the International Vaccine Access Center (IVAC), an organization dedicated to increasing global access to vaccines, at the Johns Hopkins Bloomberg School of Public Health in Baltimore, Maryland. He earlier worked at the National Centers for Infectious Diseases, Centers for Disease Control and Prevention, Atlanta, Georgia. While working for the CDC he lived for a time in Kisumu, Kenya, from which he and his family had to be evacuated in 2008 due to local violence.

== Education ==
Feikin earned his M.D. degree at Harvard Medical School. He also earned a Master of Science in Public Health from the University of Colorado Health Sciences Center and a bachelor's degree from Yale University.
