= Rex Cowdry =

American psychiatrist

Rex William Cowdry (born February 12, 1947, in Des Moines, Iowa) is an American psychiatrist. He graduated from Yale College in 1968, where he was a member of Skull and Bones, and earned an MD and Master of Public Health from Harvard University in 1973. He was acting director of the National Institute of Mental Health from 1994 to 1996. He was the executive director of the Maryland Health Care Commission from 2005 to 2011.
