= F. Curtis Dohan Jr. =

American neuropathologist (1935–2021)

Francis Curtis Dohan Jr. (November 10, 1935 – November 16, 2021) was an American physician and neuropathologist. He was the son of F. Curtis Dohan.

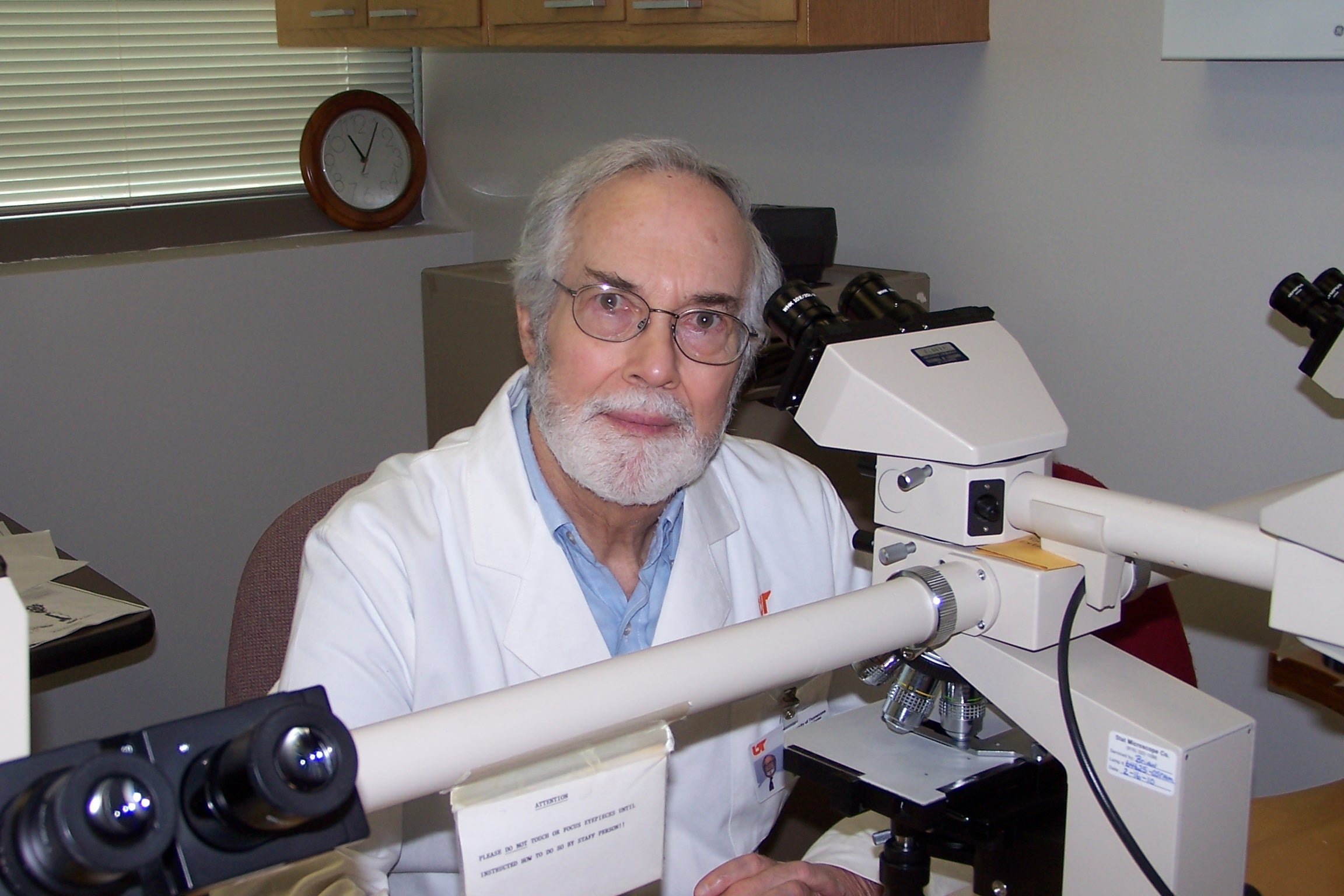
Dohan circa 2010

== Early life ==
Dohan Jr. was born in Philadelphia, Pennsylvania. His father, Francis Curtis Dohan, was a research physician and endocrinologist. His mother, Marie Postenrieder Dohan, was a sociologist (PhD, Bryn Mawr College).

In 1957 he graduated from Princeton University, majoring in physics. He graduated from Harvard Medical School in 1961. He completed an internship and residency in internal medicine at Bellevue Hospital in New York City, before becoming a research associate at the National Institutes of Health in Bethesda, Maryland.

In 1968 he returned to Boston to work in the laboratory of Nobel laureate John F. Enders at Children's Hospital. In 1977 he began residency training in pathology at the Massachusetts General Hospital. He completed neuropathology training at Boston Children's Hospital in 1983.

== Career ==
In 1984, Dohan Jr. became Director of Neuropathology at the University of Tennessee, College of Medicine in Memphis, a position he held for a quarter of a century and through which he helped to train a generation of physicians specializing in neurosurgery, neurology, and pathology.

As a medical researcher Dohan Jr. published many scientific articles, and he inspired his students and colleagues to undertake important research projects. His special interests included brain tumors, paraneoplastic disorders, and epilepsy.

Dohan Jr. died on November 16, 2021, at the age of 86.

== Honors ==
- Princeton University, Physics Achievement Award (1954)
- Harvard Medical School National Scholarship (1957)
- University of Tennessee Neurosurgery Resident Teaching Award (1986)
