= Benjamin Sommers =

American physician and health economist

Benjamin D. Sommers
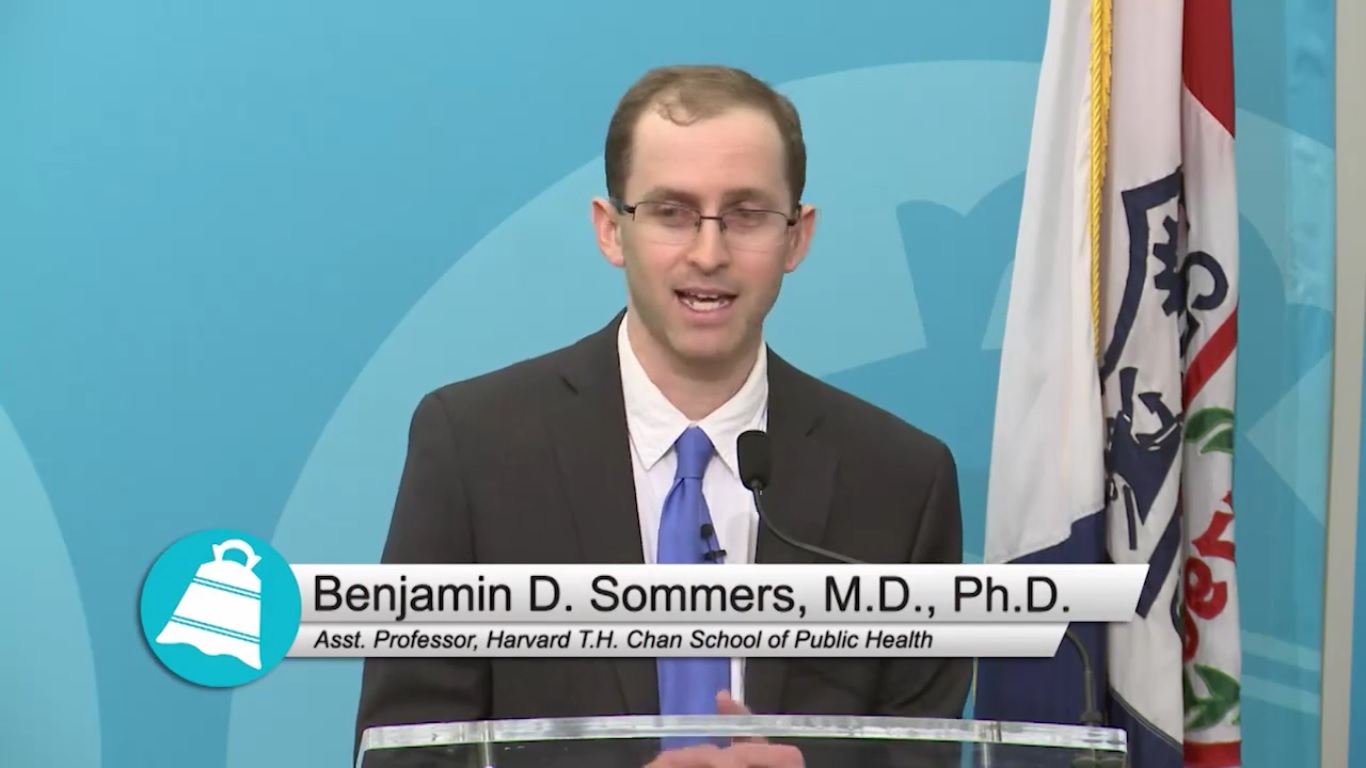
- Born: Benjamin Daniel Sommers
- Education: B.A. in English from Princeton University; Ph.D. from Harvard University in health policy
- Occupations: Physician, Health Economist
- Organization(s): United States Department of Health and Human Services
- Political party: Democratic Party

Benjamin Daniel Sommers is an American physician and health economist. He is a professor of Health Policy and Economics at the Harvard T.H. Chan School of Public Health and a primary care physician (PCP) at Brigham and Women's Hospital in Boston, Massachusetts. He was appointed by President Joe Biden to be a Deputy Assistant Secretary for Planning and Evaluation (DASPE) for Health Policy (HP) at the Department of Health and Human Services (HHS) in 2021. His term expired in January 2023. He is regarded as an national authority on Medicare and Medicaid. He currently lives in Brookline, Massachusetts.

== Education ==
Sommers received his B.A. in English from Princeton University in 2000, his Ph.D. from Harvard University in health policy in 2005, and his M.D. from Harvard Medical School in 2007. He completed his residency in internal medicine and primary care at Brigham & Women’s Hospital in 2010.

== Research ==
Sommers is known for studying the effects of health care laws in the United States, such as the Affordable Care Act and Massachusetts health care reform, on outcomes such as access to and utilization of healthcare, mortality rates, and insurance plan cancellations.
