= Macrene Alexiades =

Greek American dermatologist, geneticist, physician

- Μακρινή Αλεξιάδη
- Education: Harvard University
- Occupations: Dermatologist; Clinical Professor
- Employer(s): Dermatology & Laser Surgery Center of New York (founder)
- Known for: Macrene Actives (founder)

Macrene Alexiades (Greek: Μακρινή Αλεξιάδη) is a Greek American US-EU dual board certified dermatologist, geneticist, and physician. She holds both an MD from Harvard Medical School and a PhD in Molecular Genetics from Harvard University. Alexiades is an Associate Clinical Professor of Dermatology at Yale School of Medicine, and the founder of Macrene Actives skincare. She is also a fellow of both the American Academy of Dermatology and American Society for Laser Medicine and Surgery.

== Early life and education ==
Macrene Alexiades’ interest in botanical ingredients began when she was young, as she spent seven years on insect endocrinology projects at Queens College and St. John's University in New York City as a youth. Through this and other experiences, she developed an interest in non-toxic techniques for pest control. Alexiades received a Fulbright scholarship in between her undergraduate degree and medical school, a period she spent in Crete conducting research focused on the bioengineering of agricultural crops. In all, she received three different degrees from Harvard University – an undergraduate degree in biology, an MD, and a PhD in Molecular Genetics with her doctoral research focused on stem cell biology, cell fate decisions during development, and the molecular mechanisms of cellular aging. In 1989, she received the Fay Prize, which is described by the Harvard Crimson as “the highest honor bestowed on an undergraduate by Radcliffe College”, and graduated Phi Beta Kappa.

== Career ==
Alexiades is dual board certified in dermatology in both the United States and the European Union. According to Forbes, through her work in plant science, “She discovered ways to delay metamorphosis in insects and shifted her focus to medicine and, ultimately, dermatology taking the science with her.” Alexiades founded the Dermatology & Laser Surgery Center of New York, a dermatology practice located in Manhattan, in an office along Park Avenue. Her clients have included business executives as well as pop culture celebrities. She has advocated for more natural ingredients in skin care and cosmetics. In 2022, the American Society for Laser Medicine & Surgery awarded her the ASLMS Leadership, Mentorship & Public Advocacy for Women in Medical Science Award; she is also a recipient of the society's Richard E. Fitzpatrick Award. In addition, Alexiades has appeared on the Today show discussing trends and upcoming stories in skin care and dermatology.

In 2009, Alexiades created the Macrene Actives, which focused on creams that seek to delay the aging process for the skin. The ingredients are each grown in upstate New York. Outside of New York-based ingredients, she released the Macrene Actives Skyros Collection in 2023, formulated solely with ingredients found in the island of Skyros, Greece.

== Academia ==
Alexiades is an Associate Clinical Professor at the Yale School of Medicine as well as a Fellow of both the American Academy of Dermatology and American Society for Laser Medicine and Surgery. She is also the editor of two books: she is the editor of Cosmetic Dermatologic Surgery, a 1,000-page reference volume of which she edited in its entirety and authored or co-authored numerous chapters, and the editor of Photodynamic Therapy, of which she also authored or co-authored several chapters.
