= Philip L. De Jager =

American neurologist

- Born: Philip Laurence De Jager
- Education: Yale University; Rockefeller University; Cornell University Medical College; Harvard Medical School; Massachusetts Institute of Technology
- Known for: Research on genetics and multiple sclerosis
- Awards: Barancik Prize for Innovation in Multiple Sclerosis from the National MS Society (2014)
- Scientific career
- Fields: Neurology
- Institutions: Harvard Medical School; Columbia University
- Thesis: Cloning and characterization of the lurcher allele of glutamate receptor δ2: aberrant activation of a receptor complex results in neuronal death (1998)
- Doctoral advisor: Nathaniel Heintz

Philip Laurence De Jager is the Weil-Granat Professor of Neurology in The Taub Institute for Research on Alzheimer's Disease and the Aging Brain and the Columbia Precision Medicine Initiative, both at Columbia University. He is also the director of the Center for Translational and Computational Neuroimmunology and the Multiple Sclerosis Center, the deputy director of the Taub Institute for Research on Alzheimer's Disease and the Aging Brain, and the chief of the Division of Neuroimmunology at Columbia University Irving Medical Center. He is noted for his research on the genetics of multiple sclerosis, for which he was awarded the Barancik Prize for Innovation in Multiple Sclerosis from the National MS Society in 2014. He was elected to the Association of American Physicians in 2021.

Jager received a degree in molecular biophysics and biochemistry from Yale University, a Ph.D in neurogenetics from Rockefeller University, and an MD from Cornell University Medical College. He received an MMSc in Clinical Investigation at the Harvard Medical School and the Massachusetts Institute of Technology.
