= Frederick Catherwood =

English artist, architect and explorer (1799–1854)

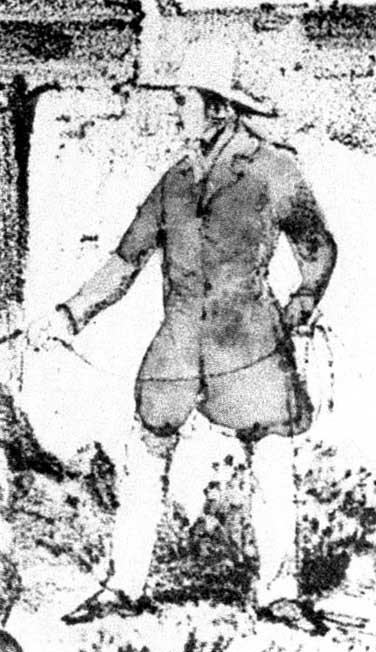
- The figure depicted in this lithograph is presumed to be a representation of Catherwood himself.
- Born: 27 February 1799; Hoxton, England
- Died: 27 September 1854 (aged 55); Atlantic Ocean
- Occupations: Artist and Architect

Frederick Catherwood (27 February 1799 – 27 September 1854) was an English artist, architect and explorer, best remembered for his meticulously detailed drawings of the ruins of the Maya civilization. He explored Mesoamerica in the mid 19th century with writer John Lloyd Stephens. Their books, Incidents of Travel in Central America, Chiapas and Yucatán and Incidents of Travel in Yucatán, were best sellers and introduced to the Western world the civilization of the ancient Maya. In 1837, Catherwood was elected into the National Academy of Design as an Honorary member.

Even though Catherwood was not the first Westerner to explore some of the Maya cities, he was the first to accurately illustrate what he saw, unlike his predecessors, such as the Frenchman Jean-Frédéric Waldeck, whose imagination sometimes ran wild. His drawings hold great archaeological value, since some sites have deteriorated since then, as well as artistic significance.

== Mediterranean travels ==
Catherwood, having made many trips to the Mediterranean between 1824 and 1832 to draw the monuments made by the Egyptians, Carthaginians, and Phoenicians, stated that the monuments in the Americas bear no architectural similarity to those in the Old World. Thus, they must have been made by the native people of the area. Catherwood made visits to Greece, Turkey, Egypt, and Palestine and with Joseph Bonomi the Younger made drawings and watercolors of the ancient remains there. During a six-week period in 1833, Catherwood was probably the first Westerner to make a detailed survey of the Dome of the Rock in Jerusalem.

Catherwood developed a reputation as a topographical artist. He perfected a drawing technique which used the camera lucida and supplied the drawings for the panoramas of Jerusalem and Thebes shown by Robert Burford in Leicester Square.

== Central America ==
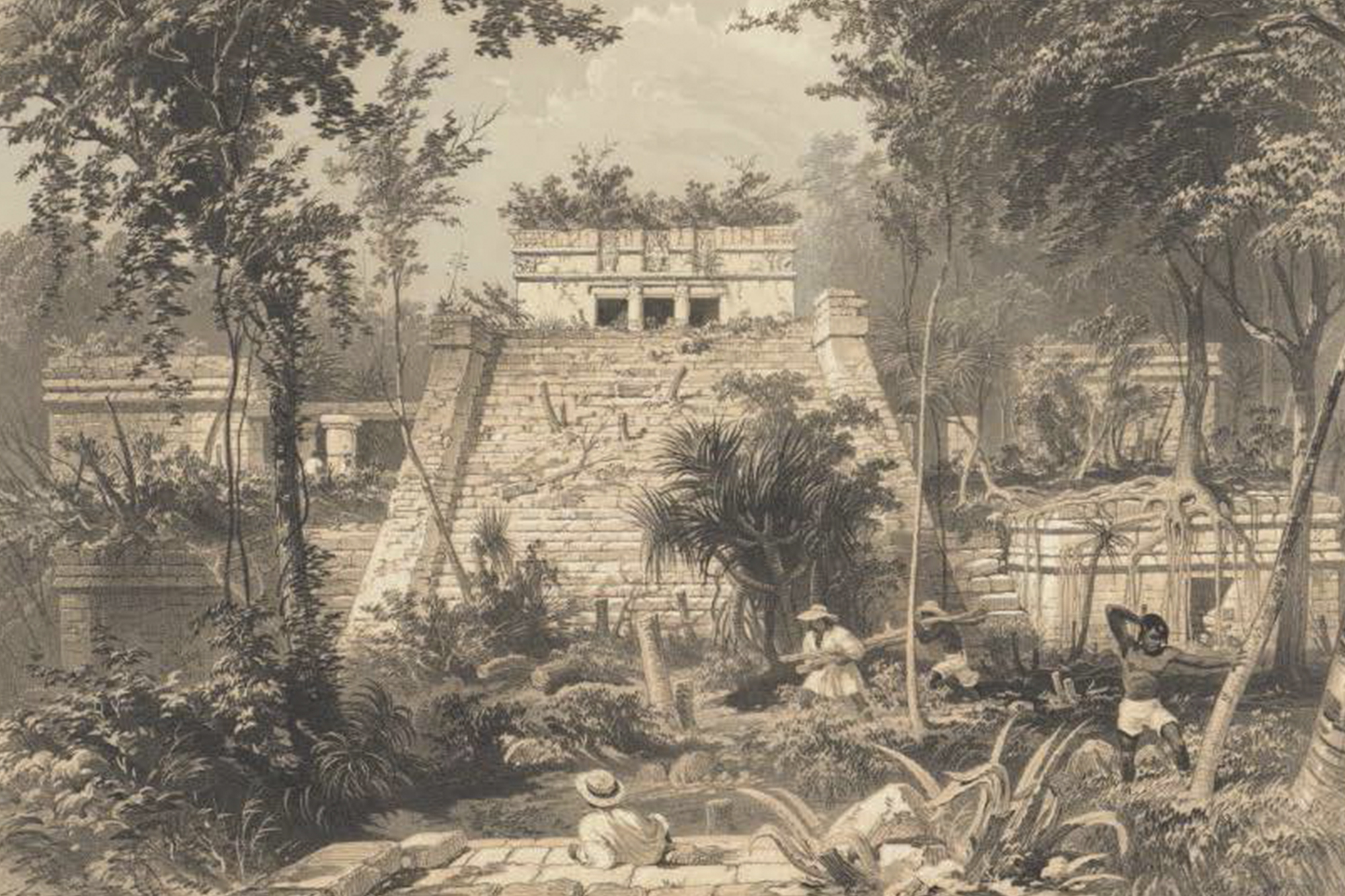
Main temple at Tulum, by Catherwood, from Views of Ancient Monuments

In 1836 he met travel writer John Lloyd Stephens in London. They read the account of the ruins of Copán published by Juan Galindo, and decided to try to visit Central America for themselves and produce a more detailed and better illustrated account. The expedition came together in 1839 and continued through the following year, visiting dozens of ruins and resulting in the detailed description of 44 sites, many for the first time. Stephens and Catherwood are credited for the rediscovery of the Maya civilization, and through their publications brought the Maya back into the minds of the Western World.

The expedition resulted in the book Incidents of Travel in Central America, Chiapas, and Yucatan, published in 1841, with text by Stephens and engravings based on the drawings of Catherwood.

Stephens and Catherwood returned to Yucatan to make further explorations, resulting in Incidents of Travel in Yucatan in 1843.

The following year Catherwood published Views of Ancient Monuments in Central America, Chiapas and Yucatan, with 25 colour lithographs from watercolours he made at various ruins. This folio was published in May 1844 simultaneously in London and New York in an edition of 300. Some 282 copies are known to survive, mostly held in private collections or libraries.

A large number of his original drawings and paintings were destroyed when the building where he was exhibiting them in New York City caught fire, but a number survive in museums and private collections, often showing more detail than the published engravings.

== Last years ==
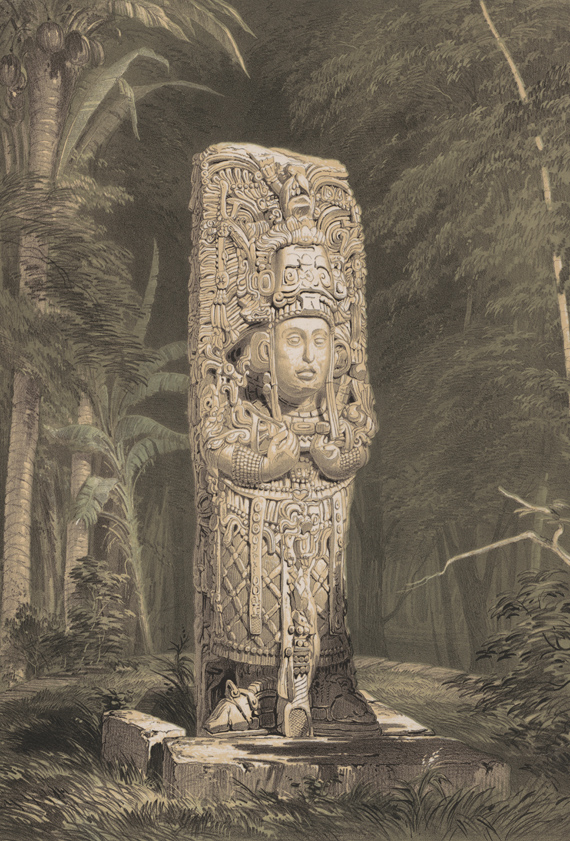
Lithograph of Stela H portraying Uaxaclajuun Ubʼaah Kʼawiil, site of Copan, from Views of Ancient Monuments, 1844.

With the California Gold Rush Catherwood moved to San Francisco, California to open up a store to supply miners and prospectors, which he considered a more likely way to make money than chasing after the gold himself.

In 1854, Frederick Catherwood was a passenger aboard the steamship Arctic, making a crossing of the Atlantic Ocean from Liverpool to New York. On 27 September in conditions of poor visibility, the Arctic collided with the French steamer Vesta, and sank with much loss of life, including Catherwood. Mysteriously Catherwood's name was left off the official casualty lists for weeks until a concerted effort by his friends and colleagues resulted in a belated inclusion of a single line in the New York Herald Tribune, under the listing of "The Saved and the Lost: Mr Catherwood Also is Missing". He was 55 years old.

== The question of his portrait ==
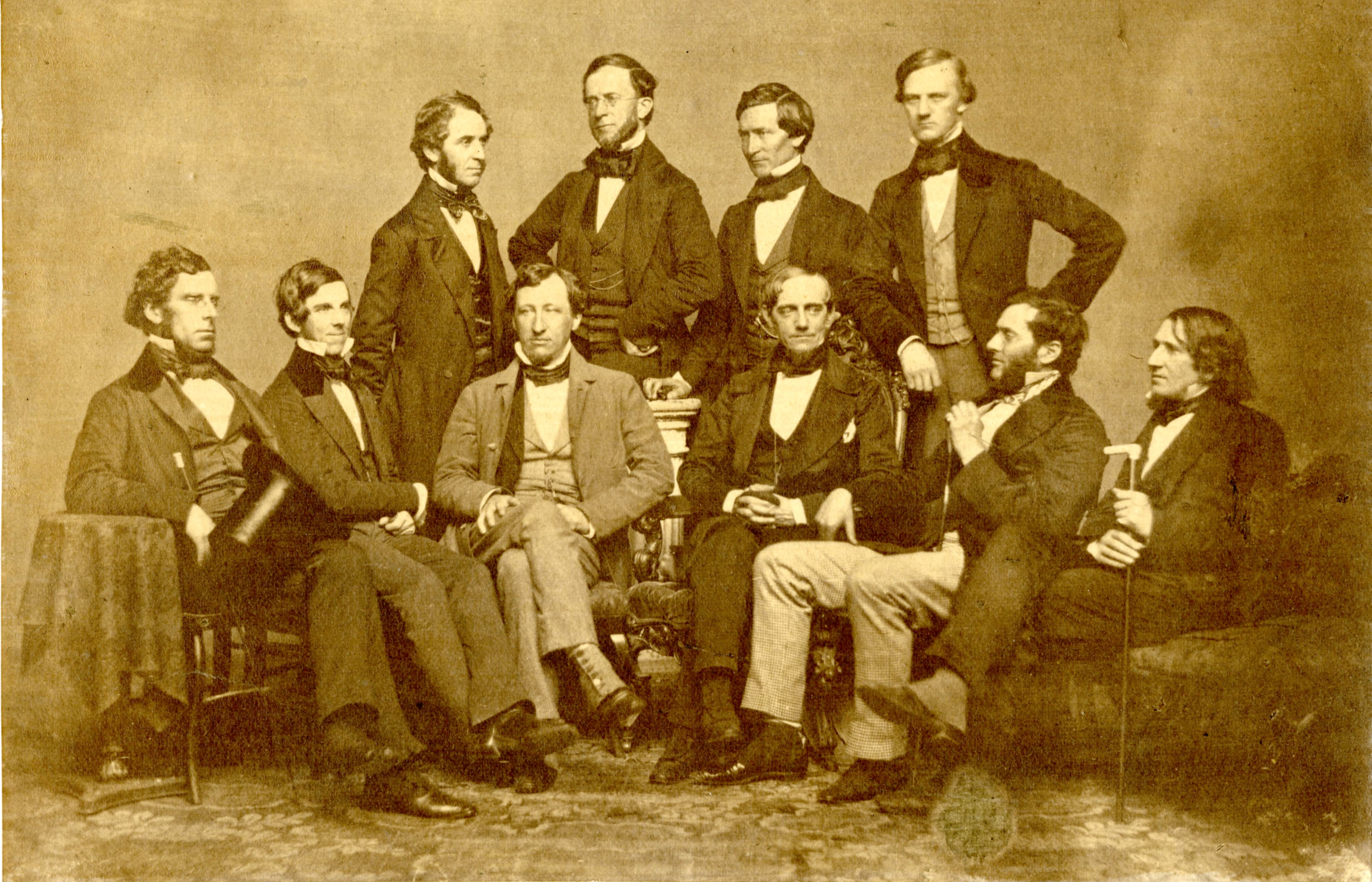
The Society in 1853. Standing: Charles Eliot Ware, Robert William Hooper, Le Baron Russell, and Samuel Parkman. Seated: George Amory Bethune, O. W. Holmes, Samuel Cabot III, Jonathan Mason Warren, William Edward Coale, and James Browne Gregerson.

Traditionally, it is thought that the only portrait of Catherwood is in the famous Table XXIV of Views of Ancient Monuments in Central America, Chiapas and Yucatan, with a view of the temple of Tulum. The scholar Fabio Bourbon, after studies and a long reflection, has formulated a different hypothesis. It is well known that during the second expedition in Central America, Stephens and Catherwood were accompanied by a young surgeon (and ornithologist) from Boston, Samuel Cabot III, born in Boston on 20 September 1815. The Cabot family was part of the upper class in Boston. At the time of the trip, he was almost 27 years old. Years later he would become an eminent surgeon and a well known personality in Boston. Samuel III was described as a person rather slender, tall, with light hair and light eyes. There is an image taken by Oliver Wendell Holmes (1809-1894) with members of the Boston Society for Medical Improvement, around 1853. Samuel is seated, third from left. Eleven years had passed since the adventure in Yucatan, but he could very well be the person depicted by Catherwood in the table, holding a measuring tape. Catherwood, in fact, was a pragmatic man, used to documenting the reality with his pencil. Frederick presumably had no interest in representing himself, indeed he never painted his self-portrait.

== Notes ==
Mentioned in the book comanche moon by Larry Mcmurthy
