= John Collins Warren (surgeon, born 1842) =

American surgeon (1842–1927)

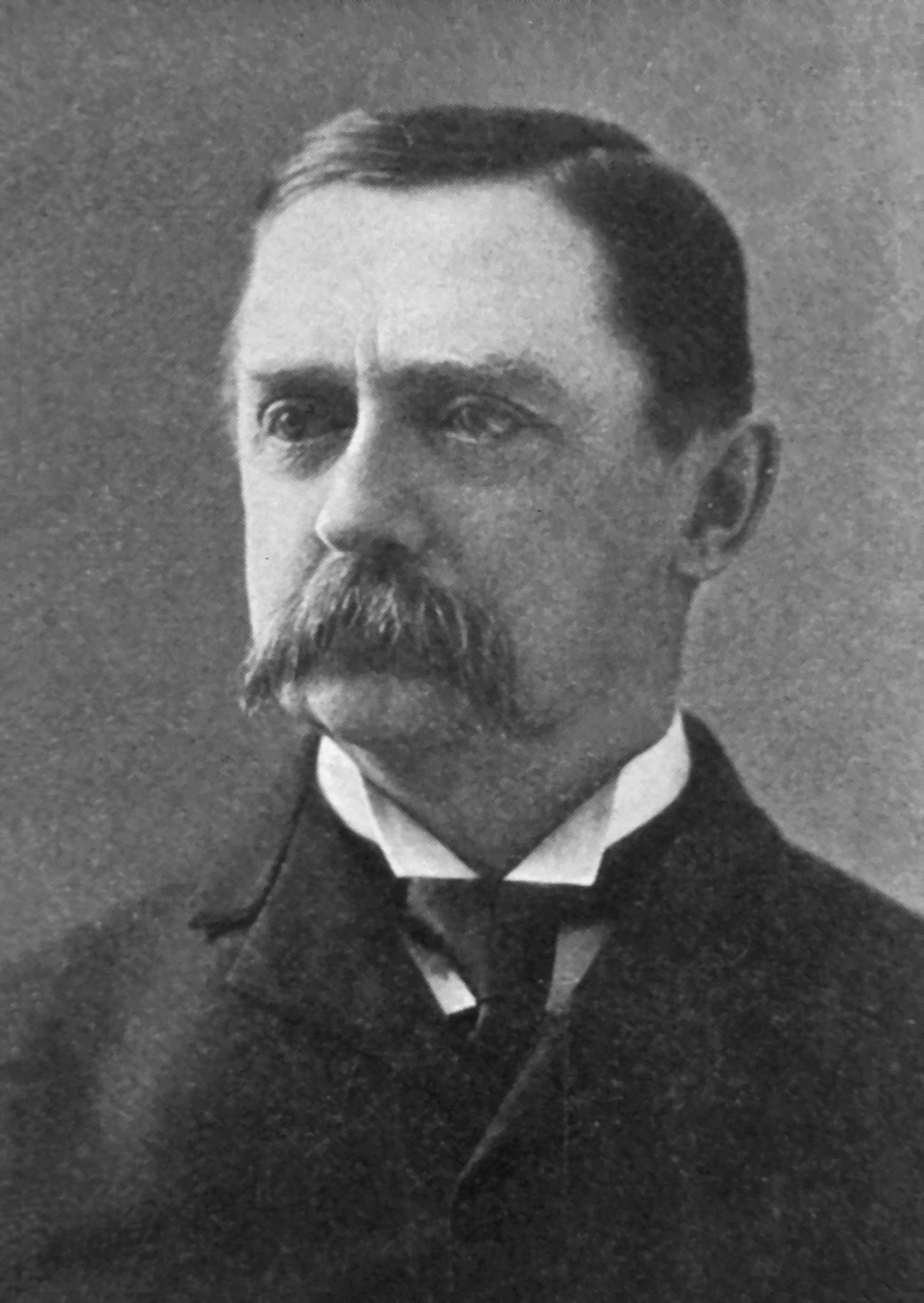
John "Coll" Collins Warren

John Collins Warren (May 4, 1842 – November 3, 1927) was an American surgeon and president of the American Surgical Association.

== Early life and education ==
Warren was born in Boston, Massachusetts, on May 4, 1842 to Dr. Jonathan Mason Warren and Annie Crowninshield. He was the grandson of famed surgeon John Collins Warren, Sr. and the Secretary of the Navy, Benjamin Williams Crowninshield, and also the great-grandson of surgeon John Warren.

He was educated at Boston Latin School and at a private school run by Epes Sargent Dixwell, that was also attended by future Supreme Court Justice Oliver Wendell Holmes Jr. He graduated from Harvard College (1863) and from Harvard Medical School (1866). Warren then continued his medical studies abroad at the Imperial Hospital in Vienna, and at other hospitals in Berlin, Paris and London.

== Medical career ==
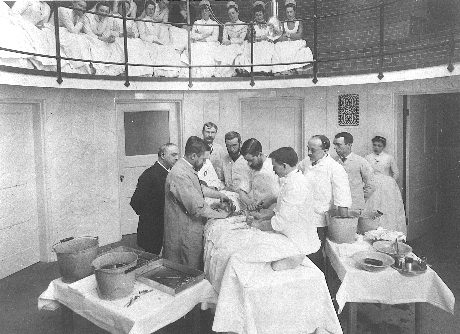
J. Collins Warren performing one of the first abdominal operations in the Bradlee Ward at Massachusetts General Hospital, 1889.

In 1869, Warren returned to Boston and opened a private practice. Warren held several positions at Harvard Medical School. He was instructor in surgery at Harvard, 1871–1882; assistant professor of surgery, 1882–1887; associate professor of surgery, 1887–1893; and professor of surgery from 1893 until his retirement in 1907.

Dr. Warren's principal area of expertise was the surgical treatment of tumors, particularly in the treatment of breast cancer. He developed a special knife for the dissection of breast tumors and had it produced by Codman and Shurtleff, makers of surgical tools.

In addition to his work with Harvard medical school, Warren was employed by Massachusetts General Hospital as a surgeon from 1876. In 1908, after his retirement, he was made an overseer of Harvard University until his death on November 3, 1927.

During his life Warren was honored both at home and abroad for his work. He was a fellow of the American Academy of Arts and Sciences (1900), and an honorary fellow of the Royal College of Surgeons (1900). The honorary degree of LL.D. was conferred on him by Jefferson College (1895). From 1873 to 1881 he was editor of the Boston Medical and Surgical Journal and in 1896 served as president of the American Surgical Association. He published Surgical Pathology and Therapeutics (1895); The Anatomy and Development of Rodent Ulcer; Pathology of Carbuncle and Columnal Adipose; The Healing of Arteries after Ligature in Men and Animals; and edited the International Textbook of Surgery (1900).

== Family ==
Warren was married, May 27, 1873, to fellow Brahmin Amy Shaw of Boston, the daughter of Gardner Howland Shaw and Cora Lyman, and niece of the scientist and congressman Theodore Lyman III. They were the parents of two sons, John Warren (b. 1874) and Joseph Warren (b. 1876).
