= Boston Society for Medical Improvement =

Scientific organization

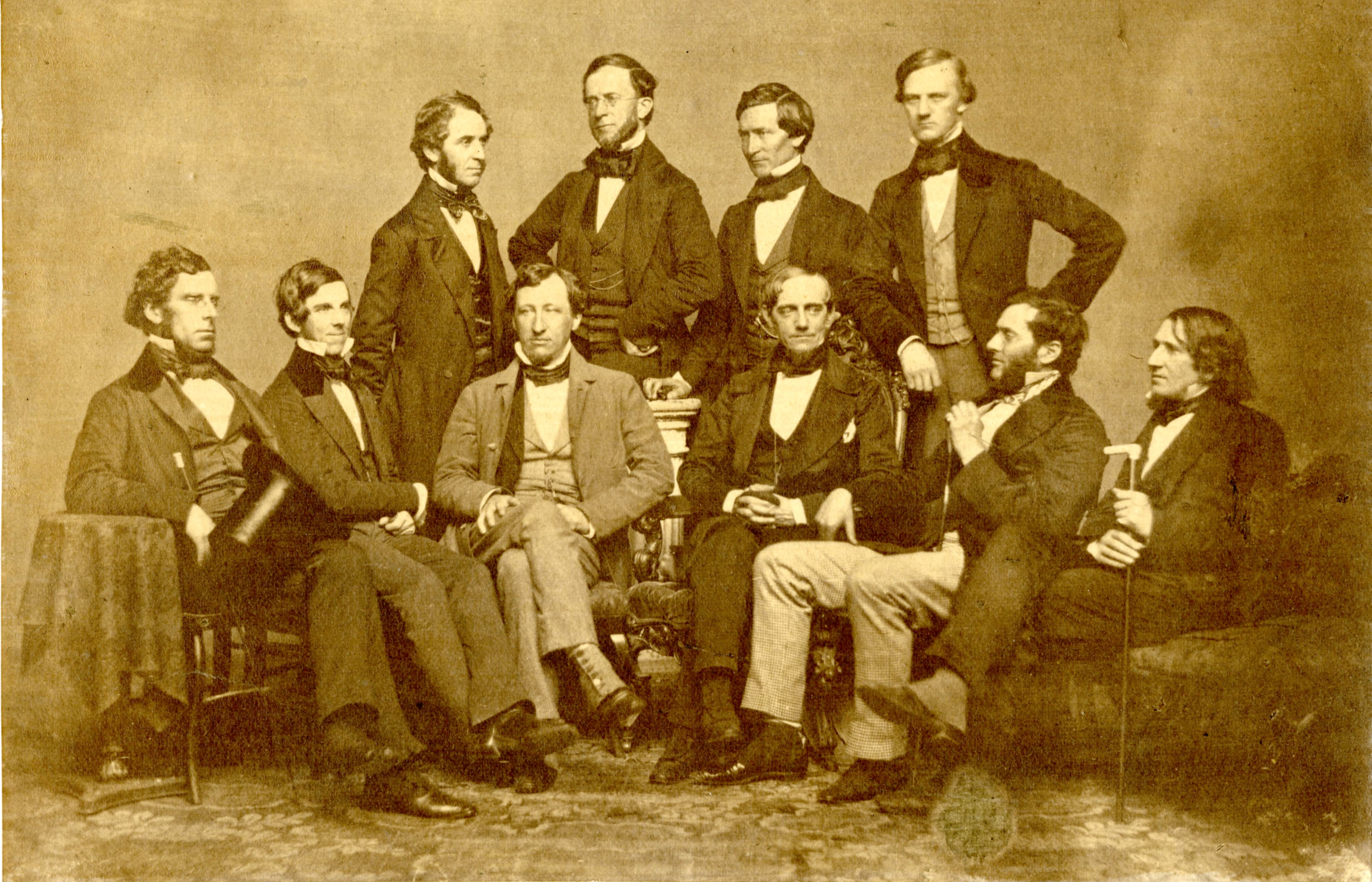
The Society in 1853. Standing: Charles Eliot Ware, Robert William Hooper, Le Baron Russell, and Samuel Parkman. Seated: George Amory Bethune, O. W. Holmes, Samuel Cabot III, Jonathan Mason Warren, William Edward Coale, and James Browne Gregerson.

The Boston Society for Medical Improvement was an elite society of Boston physicians, established in 1828 for "the cultivation of confidence and good feeling between members of the profession; the eliciting and imparting of information upon the different branches of medical science; and the establishment of a Museum and Library of Pathological Anatomy". It held regular meetings until at least 1917.

== Founding and organization ==
The Society was established February 19, 1828 by John P. Spooner. By-laws were established at a founding meeting of eleven members, and the first regular meeting was held on March 10. Within a year the Society had grown to 25 members.

Meetings were held on the second and fourth Mondays of each month, originally in Spooner's home. Usually a member's reading of a paper was followed by discussion of recent cases of either special interest or on which the attending physician wished the opinion of his colleagues. There were frequent presentations of remarkable tissues and organs obtained during post-mortems, or unusual specimens found in nature, those of particular interest being added to the "Cabinet" of the Society.

The Society's original officers were a committee of four and a secretary, who made up the "Prudential Committee", as well as a librarian and a cabinet keeper. These offices were filled once a year by vote at the first meeting in January. Members were admitted twice a year, in April and October, with only practicing physicians from Boston being eligible.

== History ==
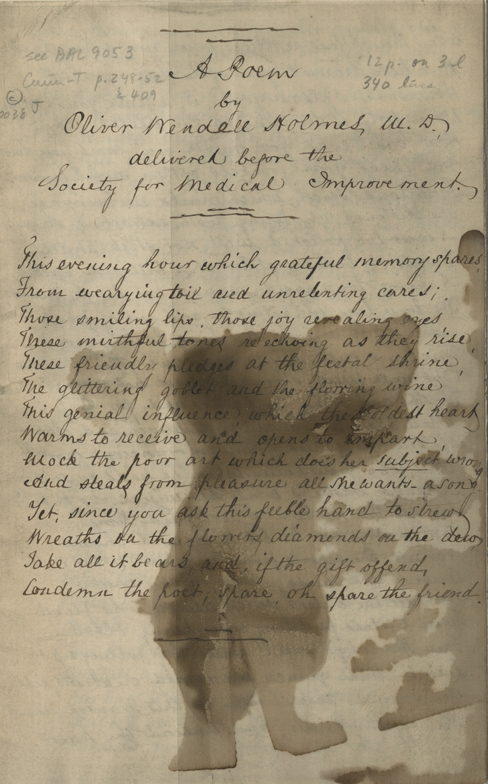
Poem by Oliver Wendell Holmes Sr., read before the Society at its anniversary dinner of 1838 or 1840

During its first year the Society's Anatomical Cabinet was established, and several members collaborated to combine the New England Journal of Medicine and Surgery and the Boston Medical Intelligencer into the Boston Medical and Surgical Journal (now the New England Journal of Medicine). The Society's expenses in the first year were $7.50.

In 1830, after resolving to publish their transactions and to have a standing committee, the Society moved to a room on Washington Street, rented for an annual fee of $25. In 1833 The Medical Magazine published a piece praising the Society and encouraging the formation of similar organizations.

The Society limited its membership to Boston's medical elite. In 1835 a number ineligible physicians (mostly younger, less established members of the profession) formed a competing organization, the Boston Society for Medical Observation. By 1838, when the Society was incorporated, membership had grown to 35, with approximately 25 attending any given meeting. Around 1840 the Society relocated once again, to Tremont Row. Until 1840 the Society often held anniversary celebrations (frequently including the presentation of an original poem by member Oliver Wendell Holmes) but after that date they became increasingly rare.

Sometime during the summer of 1842 J. B. S. Jackson "asked the opinion of the Society as to the contagion of puerperal fever and the probability of physicians communicating it from one patient to another" following the death of a physician who had treated an infected woman, and the subsequent infection of the patients he had treated in the interim. This piqued the interest of Holmes, who, after a period of research, presented his essay, "The Contagiousness of Puerperal Fever", to the Society on February 13, 1843; it was later published at the Society's request in the April issue of the New England Quarterly Journal of Medicine and Surgery.

On November 10, 1849, Henry Jacob Bigelow presented Phineas Gage to the Society, between the cases of a stalagmite "remarkable for its singular resemblance to a petrified penis" and a child cured of a swollen ankle by a Dr. Strong.

By 1853, the number of members had grown to 60. The Society's medical collections were donated to the Warren Anatomical Museum around 1870, while its library was absorbed into the Boston Medical Library in 1875. Membership had grown again by 1876, reaching 79 regular members. In 1878 the Society moved to a building on Boylston Street, the former home of Samuel Gridley Howe, after it was purchased by the Boston Medical Library Association.

By 1880, however, the Society, total membership 99, had begun to go into a period of slight decline. The office of President was instituted as part of an attempt to stem this decline; the first president was James H. White. On November 19, 1890, the Society held a special meeting in honor of Henry J. Bigelow, who had recently died.

The Boston Society for Medical Observation was merged into the Society for Medical Improvement in 1894. In 1901, James Gregory Mumford published The Story of the Boston Society for Medical Improvement in the March issue of the Boston Medical and Surgical Journal.

In 1905 the members of the Society tendered a proposal to the Boston Medical Library to disband: the proposal was rejected, however, both by the library and by vote at the next meeting. By this time the Society had reduced its meetings to an annual occurrence, and it was generally viewed as "undesirable" to have them more often, due to the fact that the Medical Library and the Suffolk District Medical Society had begun to hold joint sessions. The last record of the Society comes from 1917.

== Collection ==
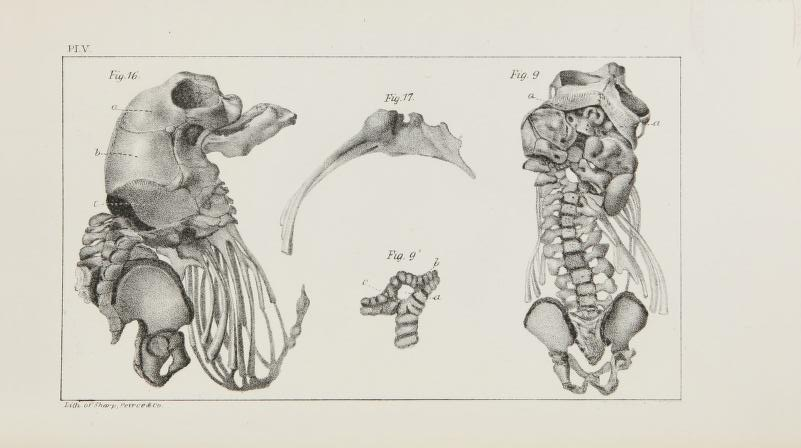
Skeleton of an acephalous (headless) fetus from the Society's collection

The Society had an expansive Anatomical Cabinet, begun in 1828, the year of its founding. It included a number of specimens from the War of 1812, which had been acquired by the Society from Dr. S. D. Townsend and Charles H. Stedman of the Chelsea Naval Hospital. It also included a number of Chinese paintings of medical cases donated by Robert William Hooper. By 1840, the cabinet was estimated to contain around 600 specimens. Beginning in 1831 the Cabinet was curated by J. B. S. Jackson (also curator of the Warren Anatomical Museum from 1847 on). The two were merged around 1870, and Jackson continued his work until his death in 1879.

The curator was tasked with keeping a catalog and a case history of each specimen in the cabinet. Jackson published two descriptions of the collection in 1847: A Descriptive Catalogue of the Anatomical Museum of the Boston Society for Medical Improvement, and later that year A Descriptive Catalogue of the Monstrosities in the Cabinet of the Boston Society of Medical Improvement, which focused solely on the anatomical oddities from the cabinet. Both books were abridged versions of the complete catalog. In the first volume, the specimens of the cabinet were divided into fifteen sections: healthy bones, diseased bones, soft parts about the bones, heart and blood vessels, organs of sense, vocal and respiratory organs, alimentary canal, organs accessory to the alimentary canal, urinary organs, female organs of generation, male organs of generation, utero-gestation, monstrosities, and parasites.

== Locations ==
When it was first formed, the Society held its meetings at the houses of its members. It then set up a regular establishment over a chemist's shop on Washington Street. Some years later, it relocated again to Tremont Row, over another chemist's shop, before moving to Temple Place. When its library was moved to the Boston Medical Library on Boylston Street, the Society relocated there. By 1901 it had moved to Fenway.

== Notable members ==
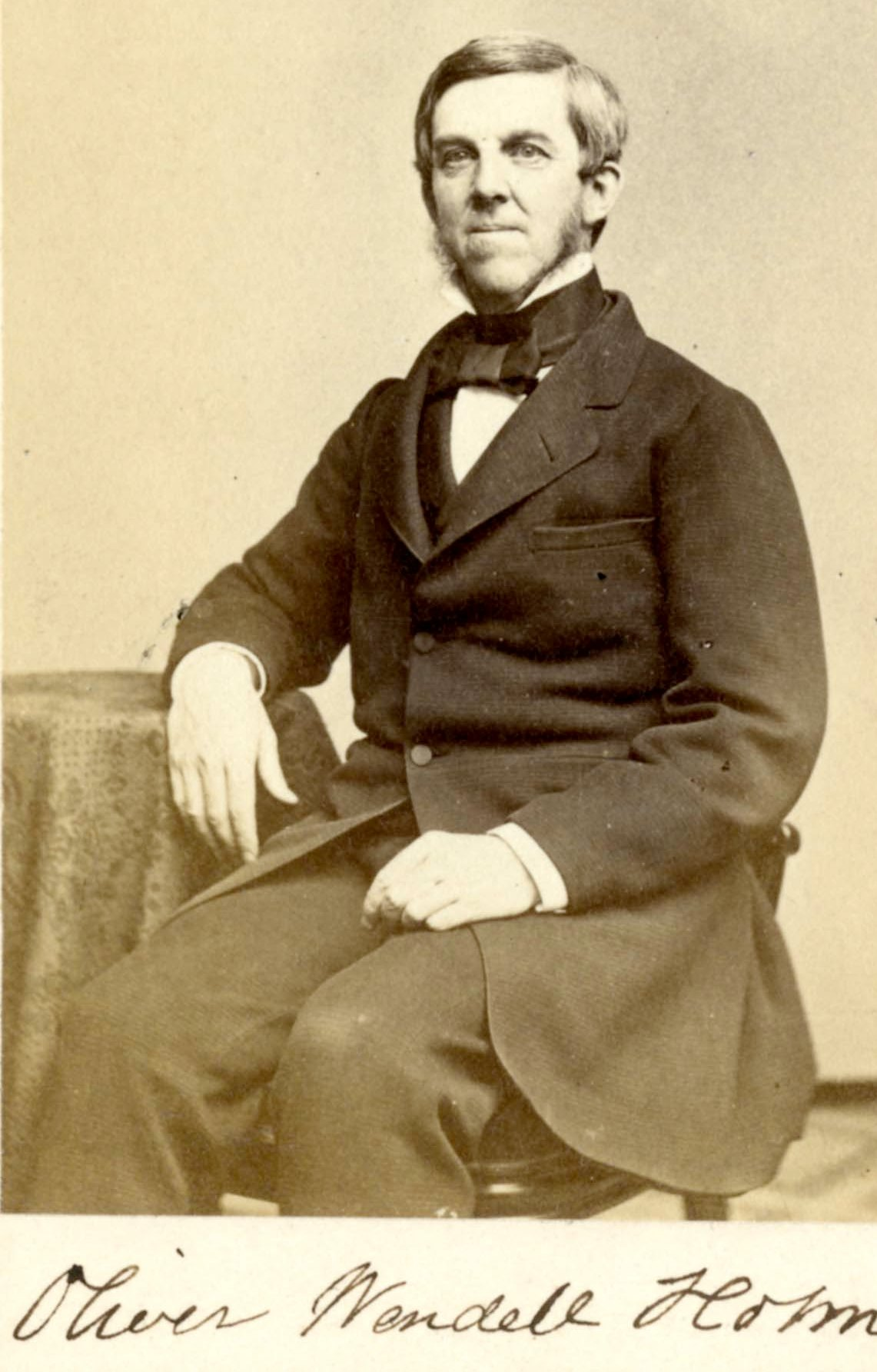
Oliver Wendell Holmes Sr. (from the Society album)

- Henry Jacob Bigelow
- Charles Eliot Ware
- Jacob Bigelow
- Henry Ingersoll Bowditch
- Thomas Dwight
- John Dix Fisher
- Augustus Addison Gould
- Richard Hodges
- Oliver Wendell Holmes Sr.
- Charles Thomas Jackson
- J. B. S. Jackson
- Nathaniel B. Shurtleff
- Nathan Ryno Smith
- David Humphreys Storer
- Jeffries Wyman

== Bibliography ==
- Jackson, J. B. S. (1847). A Descriptive Catalog of the Anatomical Museum of the Boston Society for Medical Improvement. Boston: Ticknor and Fields.
- Mumford, J. G. (January 21, 1901). The Story of the Boston Society for Medical Improvement. Boston: Damrell & Upham.
