= Charles Eliot Ware =

American physician

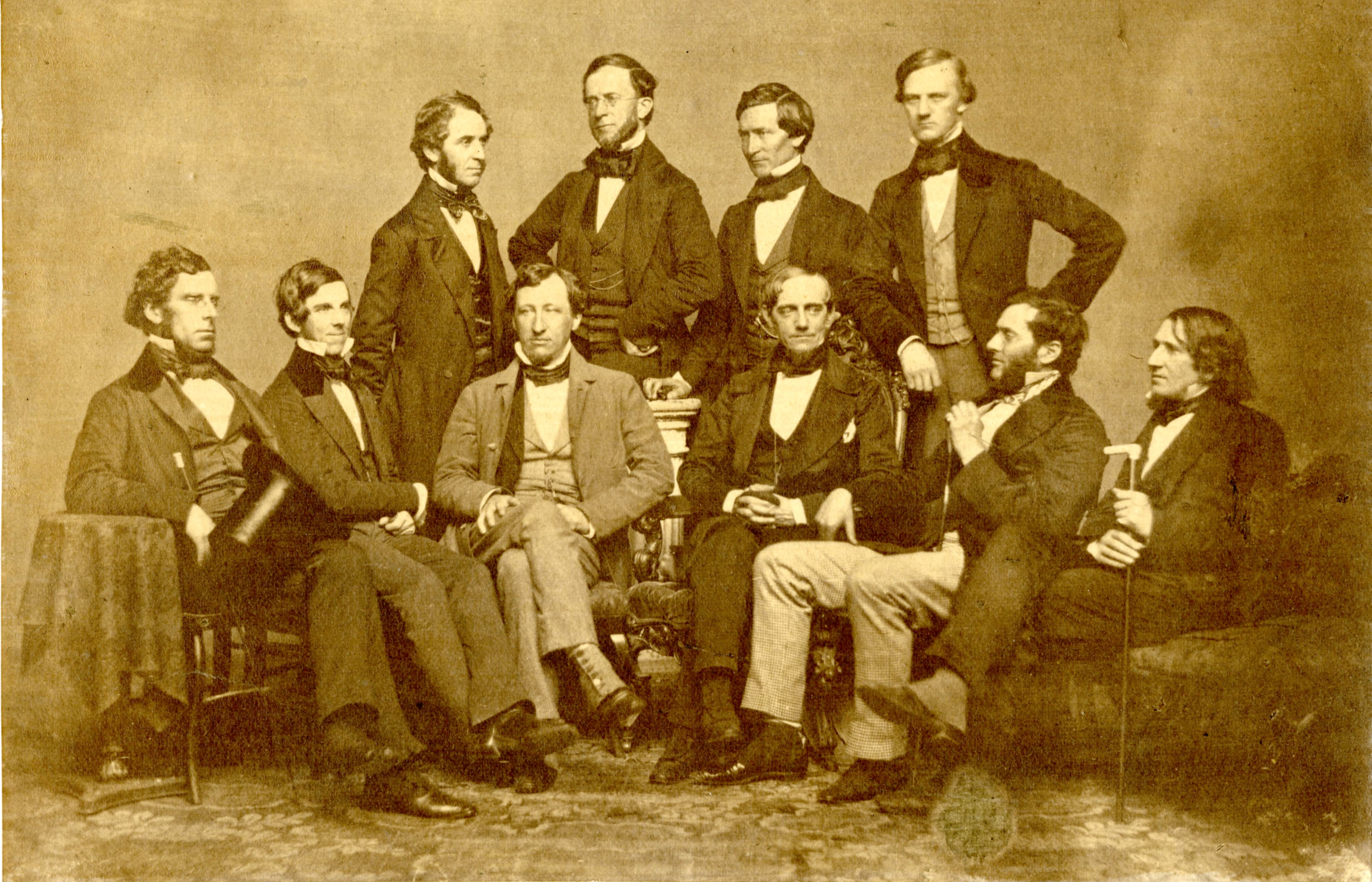
The Boston Society for Medical Improvement in 1853. Standing (from left): Charles Eliot Ware, Robert William Hooper, Le Baron Russell, and Samuel Parkman. Seated: George Amory Bethune, O. W. Holmes, Samuel Cabot III, Jonathan Mason Warren, William Edward Coale, and James Browne Gregerson

Charles Eliot Ware (May 7, 1814 – September 3, 1887) was a Boston medical doctor. He was the husband of Elizabeth Cabot Lee and the father of Mary Lee Ware. These women commissioned the famous Glass Flowers exhibit at the Harvard Museum of Natural History in his memory. Ware was also a close friend of John Holmes, the younger brother of Oliver Wendell Holmes Sr.

== Family life ==
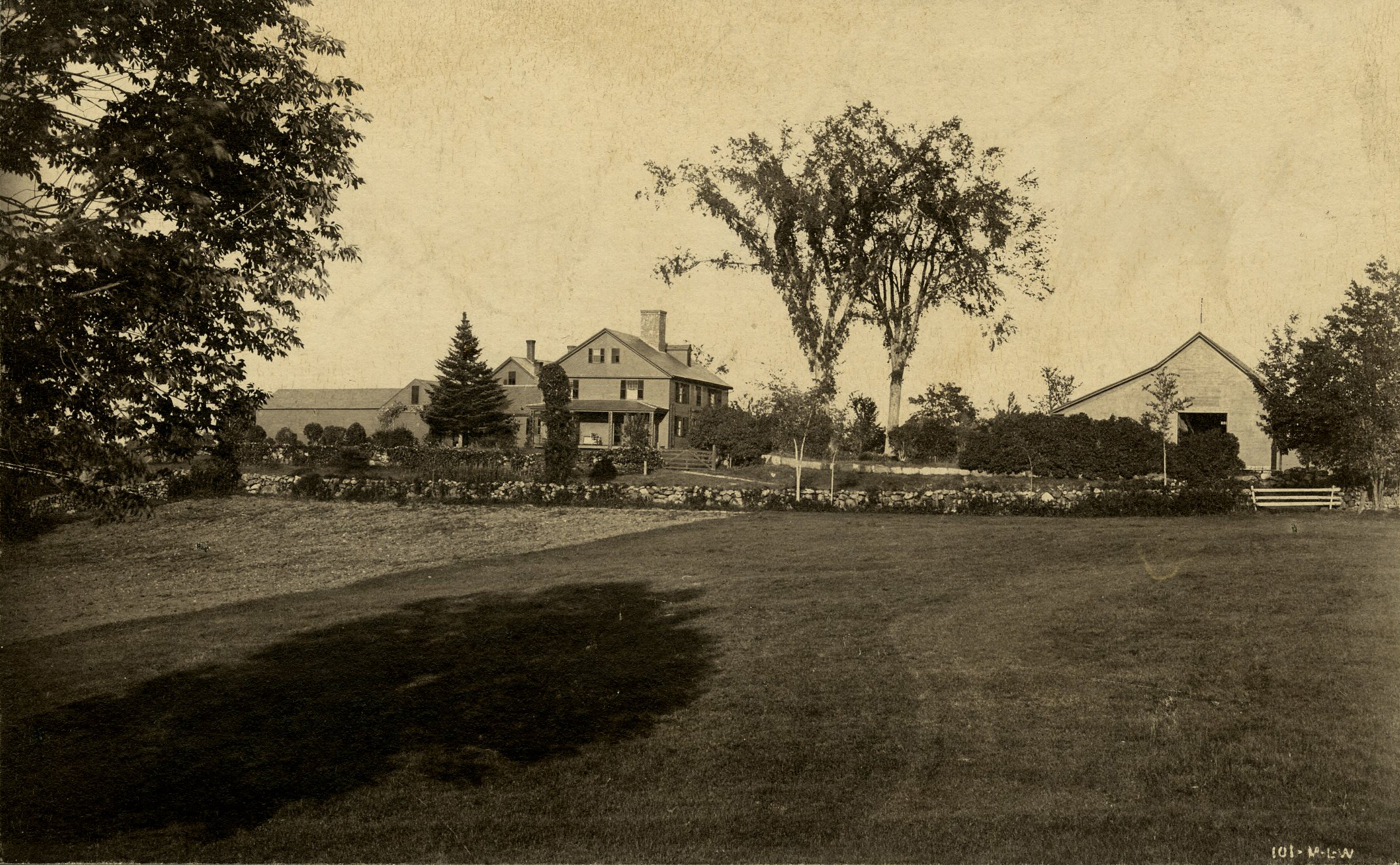
The Ware family farm in Rindge NH

Son of Henry Ware (1764–1845), Dr. Charles Eliot Ware married the wealthy Elizabeth Cabot Lee (from then on Elizabeth C. Ware) on November 20, 1854; and, in 1858, their daughter Mary was born in the town of Rindge, New Hampshire (Dr. Charles Eliot Ware's brother, Thornton, named his eldest son after Charles, with the suffix Jr., causing confusion of lineage.) While not a botanist himself, Dr. Ware and his wife raised Mary to love botany with a passion and live according to the precept "It is more blessed to give than to receive," taking her to Italy as young girl and nurturing her love of beauty both natural and human-made (i.e. picturesque landscape and the arts). Then, in 1868, Charles E. Ware bought what would become the Ware Farm in Ware Farm from a Joseph Davis and Dorestos Armory for $3000 – the place having 450 total acres, 21.5 dedicated to pasture land with another 56.5 for cultivation. This farm would serve as his wife and daughter's later home and would always stand out happily among Mary's childhood memories.

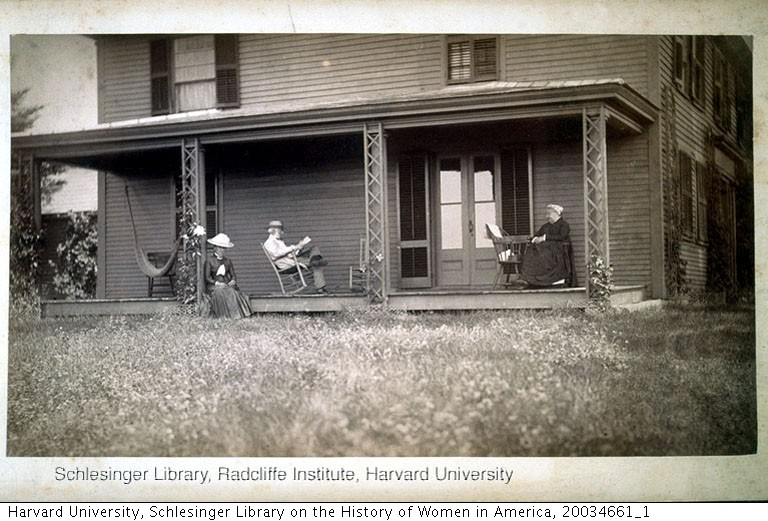
From left to right: Mary, Charles, and Elizabeth seated on the porch of a house

Seasonal residents (and farmers) of Rindge, Charles Eliot Ware and his family also kept a home at Boston, 41 Brimmer Street (Back Bay) and, eventually, they would send their daughter to Radcliffe College where she learned under Professor George Lincoln Goodale - who would become the first director of the Harvard Botanical Museum. In fact, "Mary Ware, an especially fascinating character, became in many respects a professional naturalist," a role which she was later able to utilize by being the patron sponsor of the Glass Flowers, her purpose being to advance the education of women.

== Medical career ==
Harvard class of 1834, Charles Eliot Ware received a Doctor of Medicine degree three years later in 1837 and founded a large private practice which he actively maintained for years until his health began to fail him. For the next decade Dr. Ware served as "one of the visiting physicians to the Massachusetts General Hospital, and on his resignation, in 1867, was appointed on the Consulting Staff." In 1842, Ware, along with Dr. Samuel Parkman, founded the New England Quarterly Journal of Medicine, but the journal was canceled due to lack of support after a single year.

Occupying such other leading roles as a member of the Board of Trustees - and Vice-President - of the Boston Lying-in Hospital and Secretary of the Massachusetts Medical Society, Charles E. Ware was described as "well fitted for his calling by the clearness of his perceptions, by the soundness of his judgment, and by his industrious habits. He was well read in medical literature, and, while not departing from a wise conservatism, his mind was open to receive the new truths which are constantly presented by the rapid advance of medical science." As such, Dr. Charles Ware was also a member of the Boston Society for Medical Improvement, an elite medical society based in Boston, Massachusetts established for the purposes of "the cultivation of confidence and good feeling between members of the profession; the eliciting and imparting of information upon the different branches of medical science; and the establishment of a Museum and Library of Pathological Anatomy" At some point he was also a professor at Harvard Medical School.

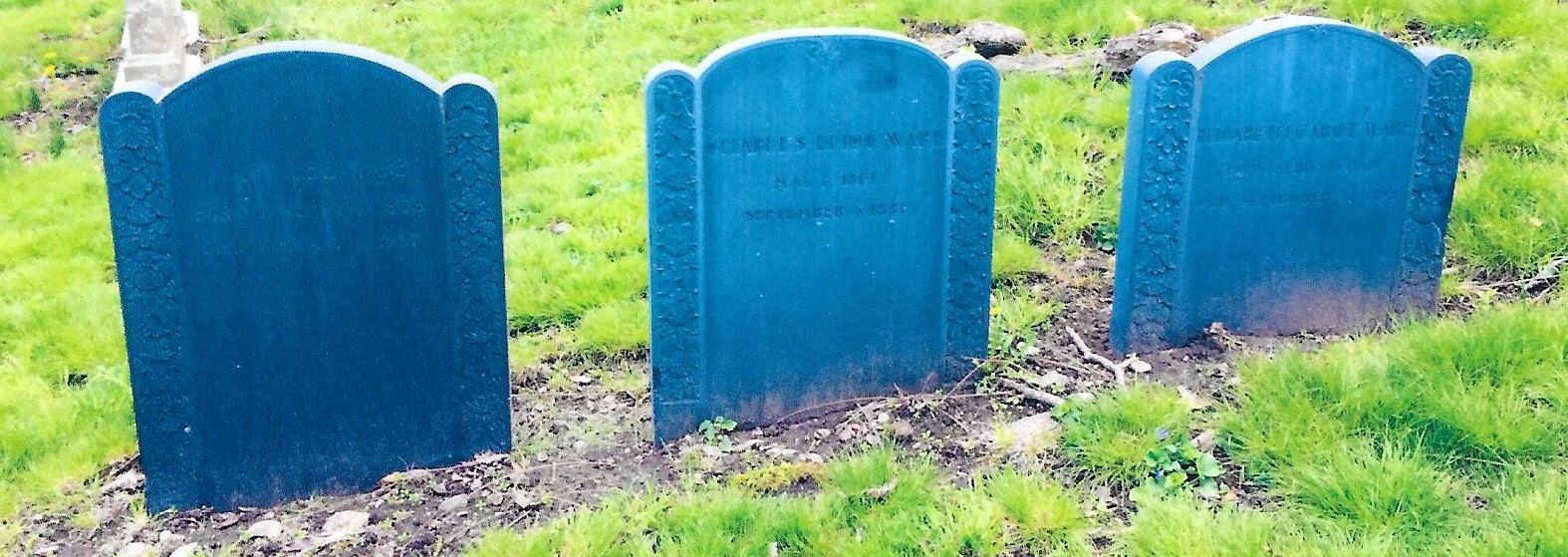
Graves of Mary L., Charles E., and Elizabeth C. Ware at Mount Auburn Cemetery

Upon his retirement, Dr. Ware continued his and his family's seasonal residency and cultivation of the Ware Farm and, on September 3, 1887, Charles Eliot Ware died in said farm - leaving it to his wife and daughter. He was buried at Mount Auburn Cemetery where, eventually, he would be joined by his wife and daughter.

== The Glass Flowers ==
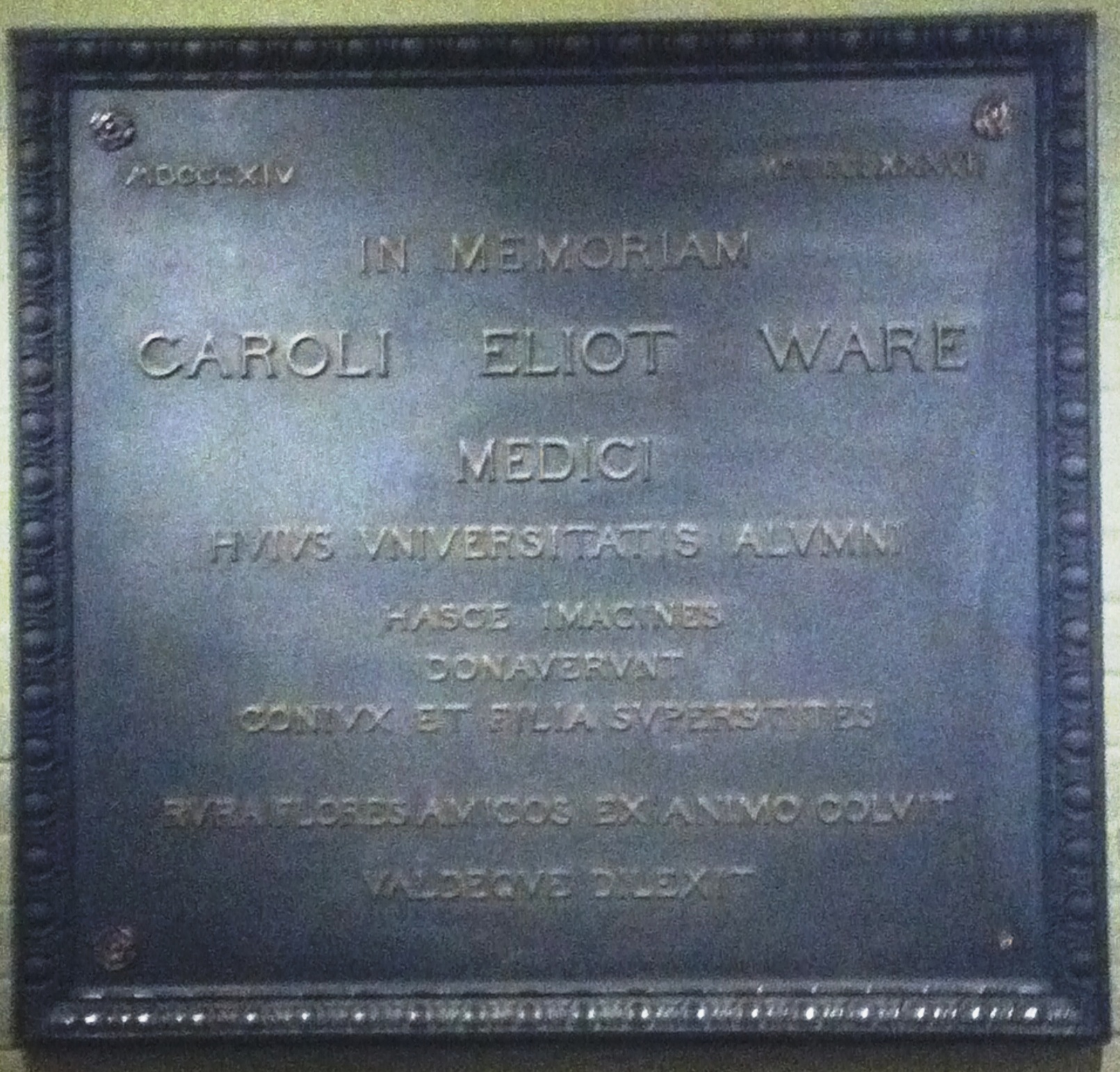
"In memory of physician Charles Eliot Ware (1814–1887), a graduate of this university. These models were presented by his wife and daughter who survived him. He sincerely cherished and deeply loved native plants as friends."

Ironically, the good Doctor's legacy and reputation as a nature-lover was established after his death by his grieving family. The "ever-loyal and ever-generous" Mary Lee Ware and her Elizabeth C. Ware, Dr. Ware's widow, were drawn into the Glass Flowers enterprise in 1886 when her former teacher, Professor George Goodale, approached them with his idea to populate the new Botanical Museum (of which he was the first director) with uncannily lifelike glass botanical specimens made by a German father and son team of lampworkers - Leopold and Rudolf Blaschka.

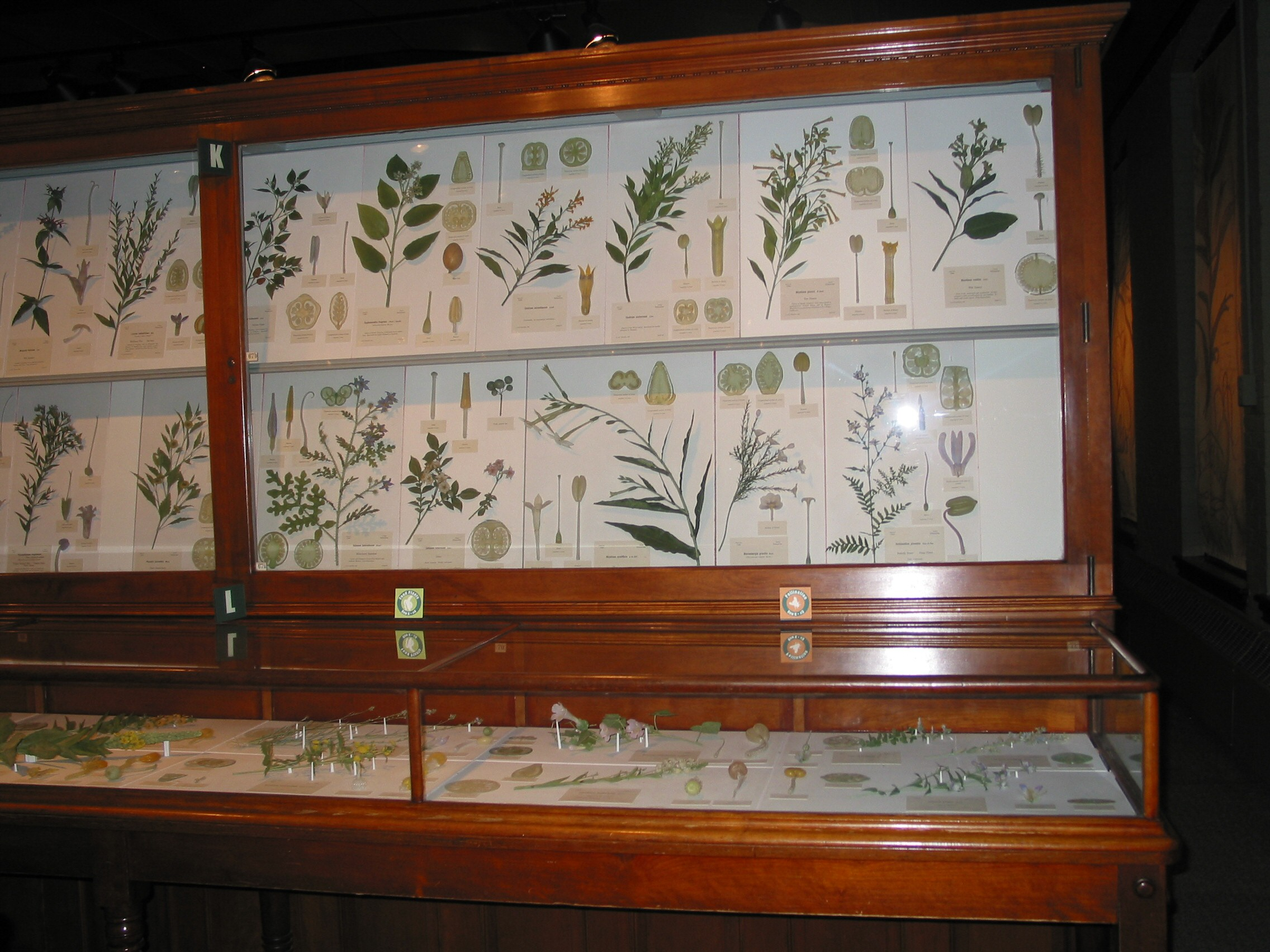
A sample of the Glass Flowers

Being independently wealthy and (already) liberal benefactors of Harvard's botany department, Mary convinced Mrs. Elizabeth C. Ware to agree to underwrite the consignment, but this was done anonymously at first (and remained so until 1888). A year later, 1887, Charles E. Ware died, thus when the official contract was signed between Mary and her mother, Leopold and Rudolf, and Harvard, the agreement was that the collection would be a memorial to the now-deceased Doctor: "The first Blaschka glass flowers are formally presented to the Botanical Museum as a memorial to Dr. Charles Eliot Ware, Class of 1834, by his widow Elizabeth C. Ware and daughter Mary L. Ware." Today, there is a large bronze plaque in the exhibit's center formally dedicating it to the nature-loving Doctor, father, and husband.

== Other indirect legacies ==
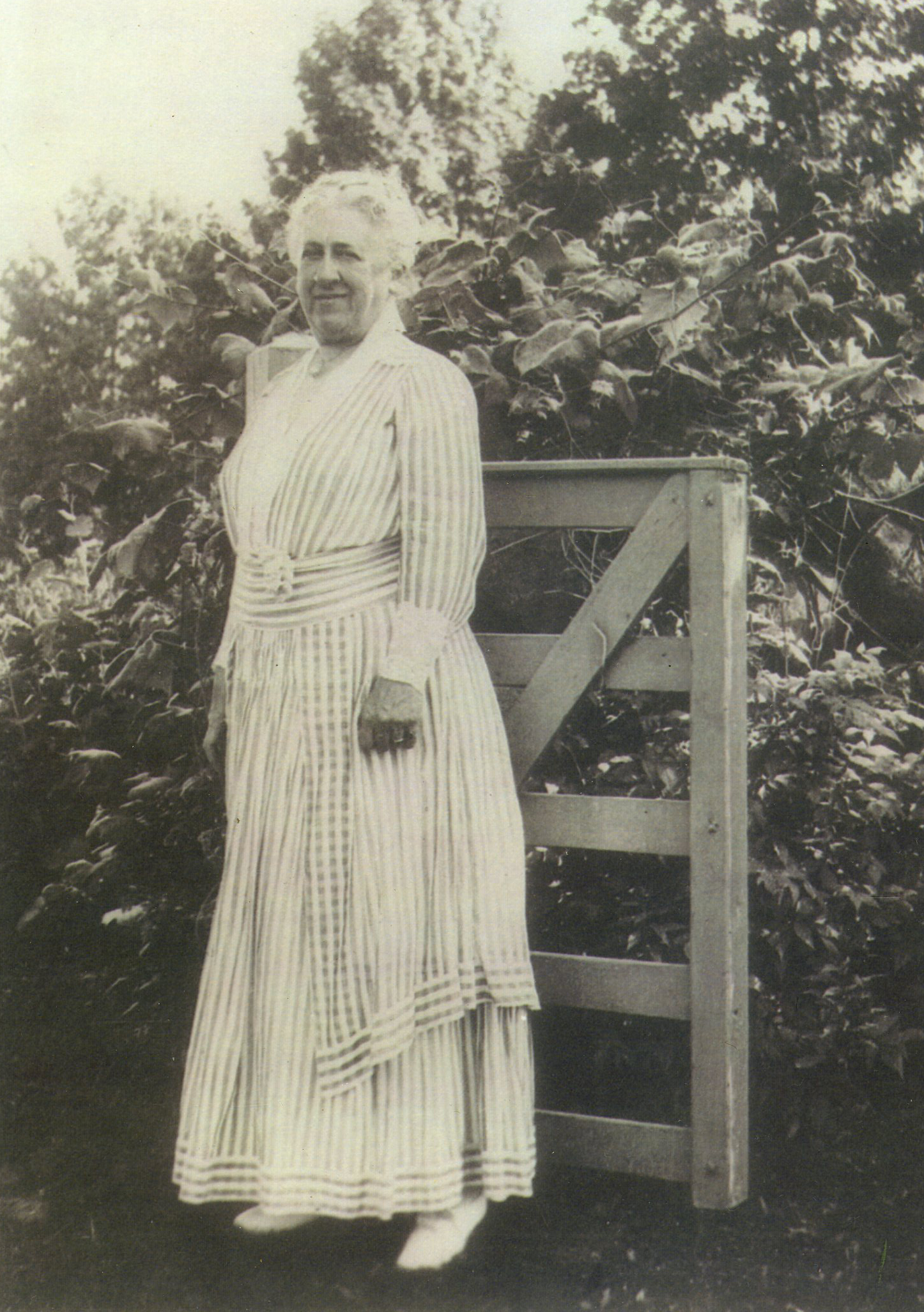
Mary Lee Ware by farm gate

In addition, the Ware Farm remains in active use today. "In 2002 Steve and Beverly Lindell purchased the property, resurrected the Ware Farm name, and have since tended and cherished the property in a manner complementary to its heritage: original buildings are lovingly preserved; the flower gardens are spellbinding and constantly abuzz with pollinators; horses roam and graze the pastures; its forest is managed in conservation through the Monadnock Conservancy. The farm presently consists of 230 acres, the majority on the east side of Woodbound Road, matching closely the original Ware Farm footprint." Today the farm is the home-base of HOOF&CLAW - a training and consultation center for dog handling and horsemanship - as well as the home of Blaine Capone, HOOF&CLAW's founder. Mr. Capone, in turn, continues to honor the legacy and philanthropic spirit of the Wares (specifically mentioning Mary), insofar as their deep love of nature went, working with HOOF&CLAW to preserve the environment and inspire solutions to environmental issues.

At some point Ware acquired Robert Salmon's The British Fleet Forming a Line off Algiers, which he later left to Mary who, in turn, bequeathed the painting to the Museum of Fine Arts (MFA) in Boston, Massachusetts. How Dr. Ware originally obtained the piece remains unknown.

Ware's only confirmed child, Miss Mary Lee Ware, become a leading philanthropist and farmer of West Rindge, New Hampshire - her contributions reflecting the nature-loving and moral lessons impressed upon her by her parents.
