= The Contagiousness of Puerperal Fever =

Essay by Oliver Wendell Holmes

"The Contagiousness of Puerperal Fever" is an essay written by Oliver Wendell Holmes which first appeared in The New England Quarterly Journal of Medicine in 1843. It was later reprinted in the Medical Essays in 1855. It is included as Volume 38, Part 5 of the Harvard Classics series.

== Synopsis ==
In just under 12,000 words, Holmes argues that the rampant infection killing women within a few days of childbirth was caused mainly through infection spread by their birth attendants. He also laid down well-thought out and easy to execute behaviors through which the spread of infection could be contained.

== History ==
Holmes developed an interest in puerperal fever by accident. In 1836 Holmes graduated from Harvard Medical School. He was Professor of Anatomy and Physiology at Dartmouth College from 1838 to 1840. In 1840 Holmes went back to Boston, took up general practice, and joined the Boston Society for Medical Improvement. At one of the meetings of the Society a report was presented about a physician who had performed a post mortem examination of a woman who had died from puerperal fever. Within a week that doctor himself died of infection, seemingly contracted when he was wounded during the autopsy he had conducted on the dead woman. The report stated that during the time interval between when the physician received the wound and then subsequently died from it, all the women whom he had attended during childbirth contracted puerperal fever. This report seems to have convinced Holmes that, as he wrote, "The disease, known as Puerperal Fever, is so far contagious as to be frequently carried from patient to patient by physicians and nurses."

The end of the essay included eight steps which birth attendants needed to adhere to in order to prevent the spread of infection from patient to patient, especially infected patients to susceptible women after childbirth. Until this time in history these eight rules were the most definitive standard so far published on the control of this terrifying illness. Adhering to these protocols likely saved innumerable lives around the world.

The essay did not have wide distribution. The essay first came to light as a paper read before the Boston Society for Medical Improvement. The Society asked that the essay be published as a paper in The New England Quarterly Journal of Medicine and Surgery in April 1843. Due to low circulation of this specialized journal and the fact that the journal was discontinued after just one year, the paper was not properly brought to the attention of either physicians or the public at large.

In 1852, Dr. James Copeland mentioned the Holmes essay positively in his Dictionary of Practical Medicine. Dr. Copeland, who was the Consulting Physician to Queen Charlotte's Lying-in Hospital in London, affirmed the contagiousness of puerperal fever by pointing out that "Dr. Holmes has forcibly and eloquently brought this much neglected subject before the profession." Dr. Copeland unfortunately also added that there was no consensus on the infectiousness of puerperal fever with such eminent experts as Hulme, Leake, Hull, Beaudeloque, Tonnellé, Dugé, Dewees and others still denying this fact.

Twelve years after the original publication in 1843 Holmes reprinted his essay in 1855 as a private publication. He entitled it "Puerperal Fever as a Private Pestilence". He had two main reasons for the reprint: first, because of the poor distribution of the essay at first; and second, to warn his fellow doctors and convince them of the contagiousness of puerperal fever. Holmes added a preface to the original essay, stating all the issues, deflating the pretensions of the professors who were still denying the cause of the fever, and warning medical students of the illogical nature of their arguments. Holmes theories were confirmed by the work of Semmelweis.
