= Richard Hodges (surgeon) =

American surgeon (1827–1896)

Richard Manning Hodges (November 6, 1827 – February 9, 1896) was an American surgeon. He is known for publishing a work on surgical joint excisions, an account of the first use of ether for surgical anesthesia, and for naming the pilonidal sinus. Hodges graduated from Harvard College in 1847, and from Harvard Medical School in 1850. He first served as a demonstrator in anatomy at the medical school and then as a visiting surgeon and adjunct professor of surgery at Massachusetts General Hospital. He was a friend and student of Henry Jacob Bigelow and was a member of the Harvard Board of Overseers, and of the Boston Society for Medical Improvement.
