= J. B. S. Jackson =

American surgeon and pathologist

John Barnard Swett Jackson
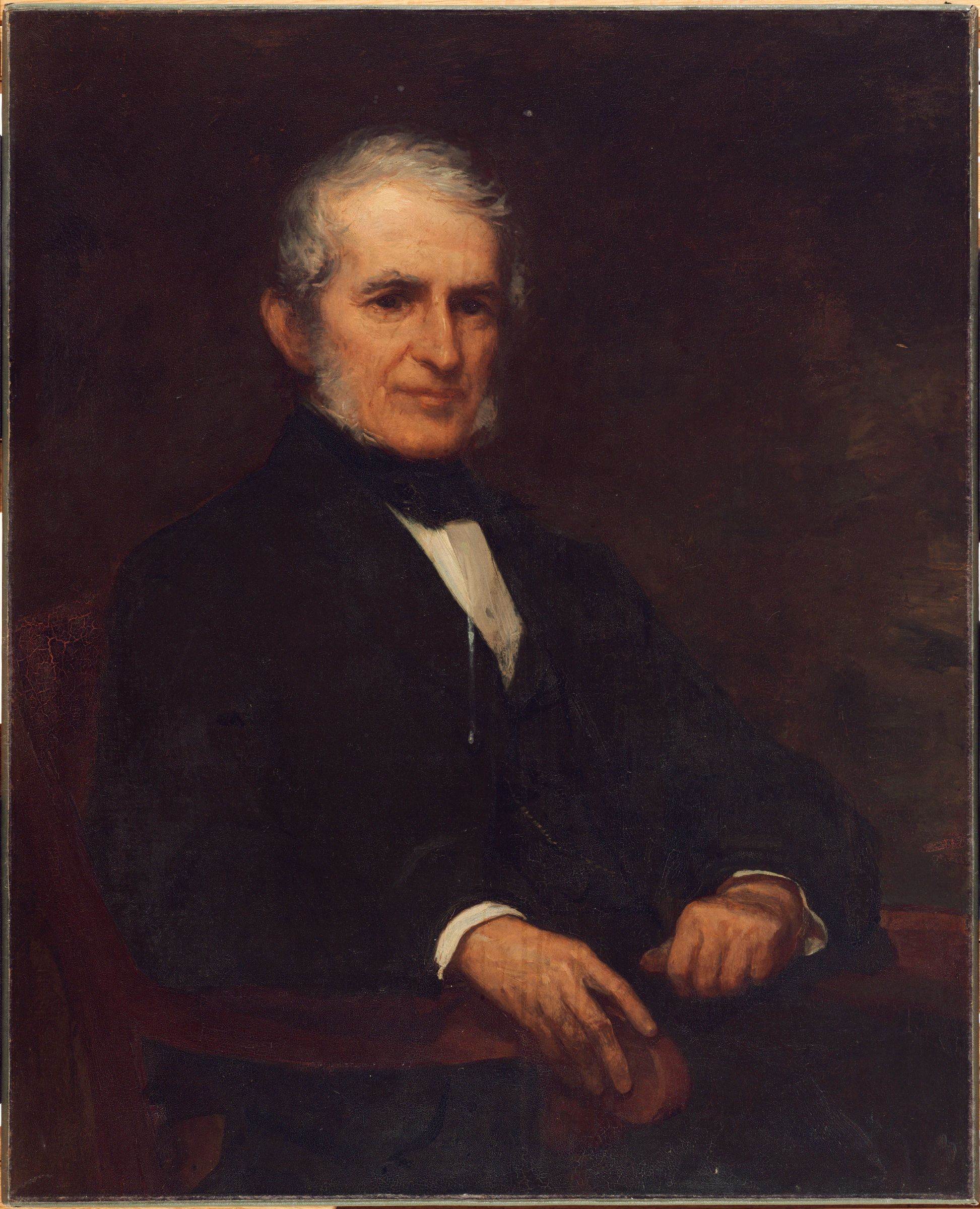
- J. B. S. Jackson, portrait by William Morris Hunt
- Born: June 5, 1806; Boston, Massachusetts, U.S.
- Died: January 6, 1879 (aged 72); Boston, Massachusetts, U.S.
- Education: Harvard University (BA, MD)

9th Dean of the Harvard Medical School
- In office 1853–1855
- Preceded by: Oliver Wendell Holmes Sr.
- Succeeded by: David Humphreys Storer

John Barnard Swett Jackson (June 5, 1806 – January 6, 1879) was an American surgeon and pathologist. He was the first curator of the Warren Anatomical Museum and was dean of Harvard Medical School from 1853 to 1855. In 1854, the Shattuck Professorship of Morbid Anatomy at Harvard Medical School was created for him. He held the post from then until his death in 1879, when the position was renamed the Shattuck Professorship of Pathological Anatomy. He was a member of the Boston Society for Medical Improvement.

Jackson was born June 5, 1806, in Boston, Massachusetts. Jackson graduated from Harvard College in 1825 and Harvard Medical School in 1829. Jackson married Emily Jane Andrews in 1853 and they had two sons together, Henry and Robert Tracy. He died of pneumonia on January 6, 1879, in Boston.
