= William Fiske Whitney =

American anatomist and medical curator

- Born: March 26, 1850; Boston, Massachusetts
- Died: March 4, 1921 (aged 70); Boston, Massachusetts
- Education: Harvard University (1871); Harvard Medical School (1875)
- Known for: Pathologist; Medical Museum Curator
- Scientific career
- Fields: Anatomy Pathology
- Workplaces: Massachusetts General Hospital and Warren Museum

William Fiske Whitney (March 26, 1850 – March 4, 1921) was an American anatomist, curator, and pathologist. Whitney was a pioneer in the field of the medical museum and originator of the method of quick diagnosis. An obituary describes him as "another of those early pioneers in pathology and the use of the microscope on this continent of whom his contemporaries, the late Sir William Osler and Prof. William H. Welch are notable examples." He specialized in anatomy, becoming one of the top experts in the country. Later, he was much sought after by the courts for his exceptional anatomical knowledge, especially in determining if poison had any bearing on a case.

== Personal life ==
=== Early years and education ===
Whitney was born in Boston, Massachusetts, on March 26, 1850. He was the son of William Fiske Whitney and Frances Anne (Rice) Whitney.

Whitney graduated from Harvard University in 1871 and Harvard Medical School in 1875. While studying medicine he served as a house physician at Massachusetts General Hospital from 1874 to 1875, following the tradition of most eminent American physicians and surgeons of the last century. After receiving his M.D., Whitney spent three years studying anatomy abroad in Berlin, Munich, and Strasburg.

=== Family ===
Whitney was married to Louisa Elliot of Stockton, California, on April 26, 1888. The family resided at 228 Marlboro Street, Boston. They had two sons, named Lyman Fiske Whitney and William Elliott Whitney. Both sons were educated at Harvard and served in the (First) World War.

=== Hobbies and associations ===
He was an active member of a number of clubs and associations. His gentlemen's clubs included the Union Club, the St. Botolph Club, and the Harvard Club.

An avid sailor, Whitney was a member of the Corinthian Yacht Club, the Eastern Yacht Club in Marblehead, and the Boston Yacht Club. He also belonged to the Boston Athletic Association and The Country Club in Brookline.

Whitney was also known as a linguist, having 'familiarity with more than half a dozen different languages.'

=== Death ===
Whitney died from a cerebral hemorrhage at his Boston home on March 4, 1921. He was 70 years old.

== Professional life ==
=== Clinical pathologist ===
Whitney was pathologist to the Massachusetts General Hospital from 1878 to his retirement in 1916; from 1901 to 1916, he was the MGH's first Surgical Pathologist. Whitney entered his profession at the time when the microscope was just beginning to feature prominently in medical teaching and practice and when scientific medicine was beginning to receive signature in the medical curriculum. MGH created a new pathology department in 1896, reflecting the growing importance of this new field. "During his tenure, Whitney saw the movement of diagnostic pathology from the realm of the surgeon to the hand of the specialist pathologist."

As an active operating surgeon he perfected a method for rapid diagnosis. His rapid histological method for immediate pathological diagnosis was applied in the operating room, at the bedside, and at court. His contributions made him "a major transitional figure in the practice of pathology at the hospital."

He was also known for his ability to use fresh specimens in diagnosis.

=== Other medical appointments ===
In 1879 Whitney was appointed curator of the Warren Anatomical Museum at the Harvard Medical School, a capacity he filled for 42 years until his death. Under his curatorship, the Warren Museum passed from its original home in the old Harvard School building on North Grove Street in Boston to more adequate quarters on Boylston Street, and then to its present location in the front block of the Longwood Avenue building.

From 1883 to 1890 he was secretary of the medical faculty at Harvard Medical School. Part of that time he also served as Acting Dean.

Around the same time he was sent to Europe by the government to investigate tuberculosis.

From 1891 to 1901 he served as a professor of parasites and parasitic diseases with the Veterinary School of Harvard.

He was professor of "Diagnosis of New Growths" from 1904 to 1905 in the Graduate Department.

He also served on numerous committees at the Harvard's medical school. He contributed to a "notable" report of findings by a committee on comparative medicine. Later he was part of a committee representing the principle departments of instructions and research work at the Medical School. He also served on the 1880 committee that supervised the planning and building of the old Harvard Medical School on Boylston Street, and again on the 1900 committee that considered the plans for a new group of buildings for the Medical School on Longwood Avenue.

=== Expert witness ===
Whitney's knowledge of anatomy made him a popular expert witness in court. His opinions were especially sought in cases of poison and murder.

=== Publications ===
Whitney published a number of articles, chiefly about diagnostic techniques. His principal contributions to medical literature were his "Statistics Lecture before the Massachusetts Medical Society, in 1901" and the "Thirty-Second Report of the Massachusetts State Board of Health for 1901."

He delivered the 1901 Shattuck Lecture at the annual meeting of the Massachusetts Medical Society, entitled "The Alleged Increase of Cancer in Massachusetts." His lecture was based on his studies of world-wide statistics from which he made his "Comparative Study of Death Rates from Cancer for the Years 1850, 1875, and 1900."

He authored a number of other articles on carcinoma, which was one of his lifelong studies.

=== Professional memberships and honors ===
- Member from 1870, committee member, counselor, and Vice President of the Boston Society of Natural History
- Member of the Massachusetts Medical Society
- Member of the American Medical Association
- President of the Massachusetts Obstetrical Society
- Active and interested member of the International Association of Medical Museums from its first organization in 1907, and he was one of its warmest supporters
- President of the Massachusetts General Hospital Alumni Association

== See also ==
- Warren Anatomical Museum
