= Thomas Dwight =

American physician, anatomist and teacher

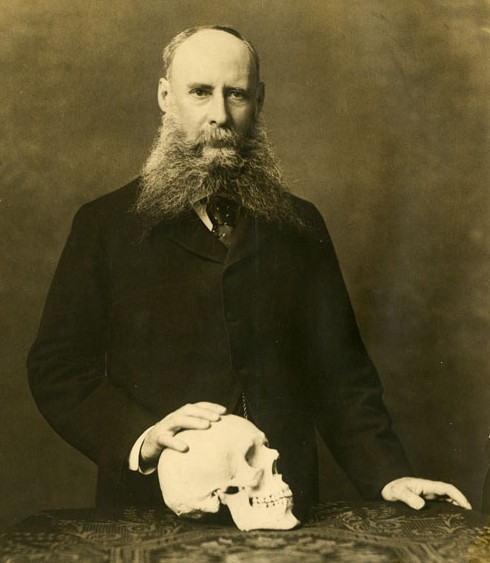
- Thomas Dwight with skull, 1896.
- Born: October 13, 1843; Boston, Massachusetts
- Died: September 8, 1911 (aged 67); Nahant, Massachusetts
- Occupations: physician, anatomist and professor.
- Spouse: Sarah C. Iasigi

Thomas Dwight (1843–1911) was an American physician, anatomist and teacher.

== Early life ==
Thomas Dwight was born on October 13, 1843, in Boston, Massachusetts. His father was also named Thomas Dwight (born September 27, 1807 – 1876), part of the New England Dwight family. His mother was Mary Collins Warren (b. Jan 19, 1816-Oct 22. 1900), whose father John Collins Warren (1778 –1856), and grandfather John Warren (1753–1815) were both surgeons.

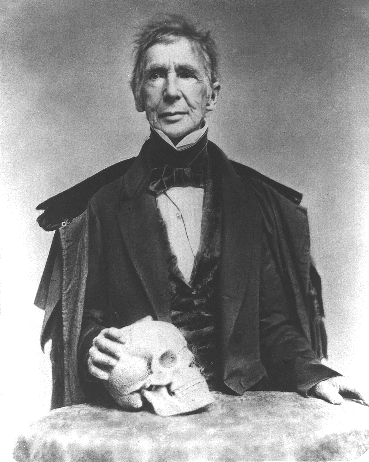
Dr John Collins Warren with skull 1850

Dwight joined the Catholic Church in 1856, and graduated from the Harvard Medical School in 1867. He then studied abroad.

== Career ==
Dwight was instructor in comparative anatomy at Harvard College, from 1872 to 1873. Hee also lectured at Bowdoin College. He succeeded Oliver Wendell Holmes Sr. as Parkman professor of anatomy at Harvard Medical School in 1883.

In the Warren Museum of Anatomy at Harvard, Dwight arranged a section of osteology, considered one of the best in existence, and he had an international reputation as an anatomist.

He served as the third president of the Association of American Anatomists from 1894-1895.

Among his writings are: "Frozen Sections of a Child" (1872); "Clinical Atlas of Variations of the Bones of the Hands and Feet" (1907); "Thoughts of a Catholic Anatomist" (1911), a valuable work of Christian apologetics.

== Personal life ==
Dwight died September 8, 1911, in Nahant, Massachusetts, at age 68.

== Selected works ==
- The Anatomy of the Head. Boston: H.O. Houghton & Company, 1876.
- Frozen Sections of a Child. New York: William Wood & Company, 1881.
- Commonplaces of History. Boston: Review Pub. Co., 1900.
- A Clinical Atlas, Variations of the Bones of the Hands and Feet. Philadelphia: J.B. Lippincott Company, 1907.
- The Church and Science. Boston: Review Pub. Co., 1908.
- Thoughts of a Catholic Anatomist. London: Longmans, Green and Co., 1911.
- Human Anatomy. Philadelphia: J.B. Lippincott Company, 1923.

=== Articles ===
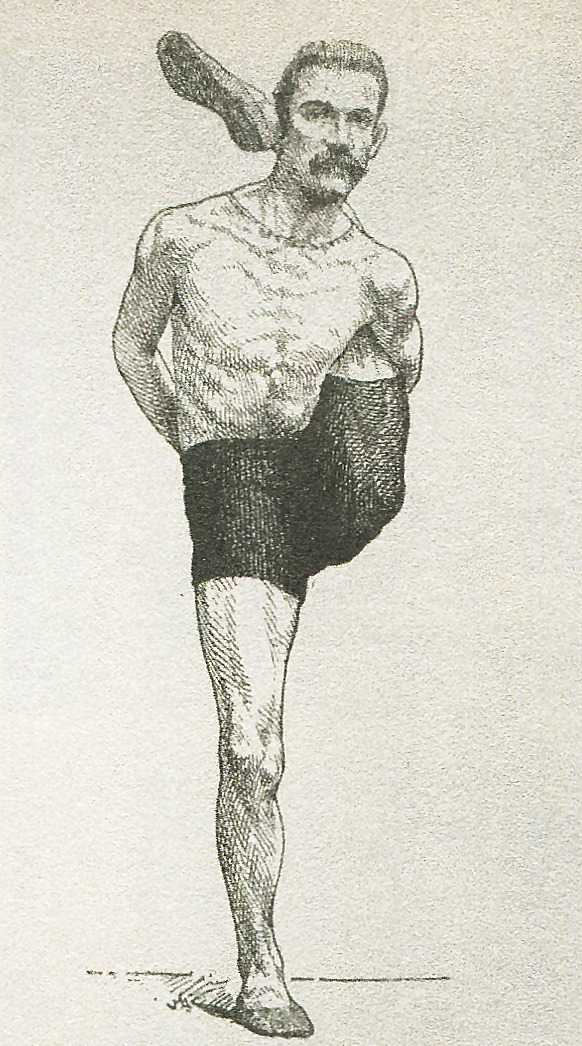
Man standing in a pose close to Durvasasana, an asana in hatha yoga. Figure 12 in Dwight's "The Anatomy of a Contortionist", 1889

- "Remarks on the Brain, Illustrated by the Description of the Brain of a Distinguished Man," Proceedings of the American Academy of Arts and Sciences, Vol. 13, 1877–1878.
- "The Significance of Anatomical Anomalies," The American Catholic Quarterly Review, Vol. XI, 1886.
- "Science or Bumblepuppy," The American Catholic Quarterly Review, Vol. XII, 1887.
- "The Range of Variation of the Human Shoulder-Blade," The American Naturalist, Vol. 21, No. 7, Jul., 1887.
- "Anatomy of the Contortionist," Scribner's, April 1889.
- "What Is Right-Handedness?," Scribner's, April 1891.
- "Observations on the Psoas Parvus and Pyramidalis. A Study of Variation," Proceedings of the American Philosophical Society, Vol. 31, No. 140, 1893.
- "Sir Richard Owen," Proceedings of the American Academy of Arts and Sciences, Vol. 28, 1892–1893.
- "Reminiscences of Dr. Holmes, as Professor of Anatomy," Scribner's, January 1895.
- "The Significance of Anomalies," The American Naturalist, Vol. 29, No. 338, 1895.
- "The Teaching of Anatomy," Science, New Series, Vol. 4, No. 83, 1896.
- "Anatomy Laws versus Body Snatching," The Forum, December 1896.
- "Mutations," Science, New Series, Vol. 21, No. 536, 1905.

== Gallery ==
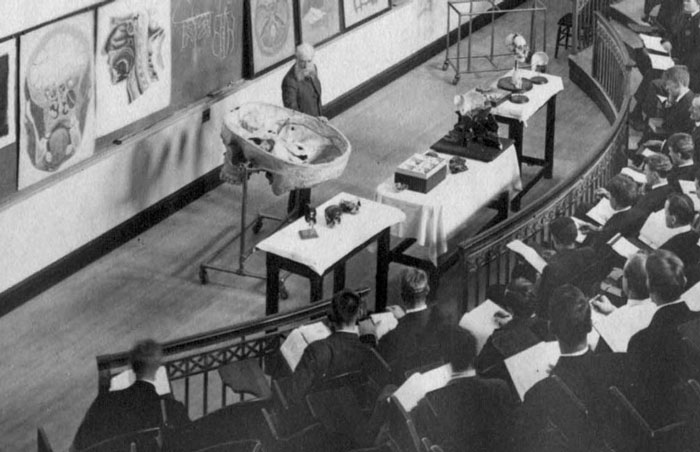
Dr. Thomas Dwight, lecturing students, 1906.

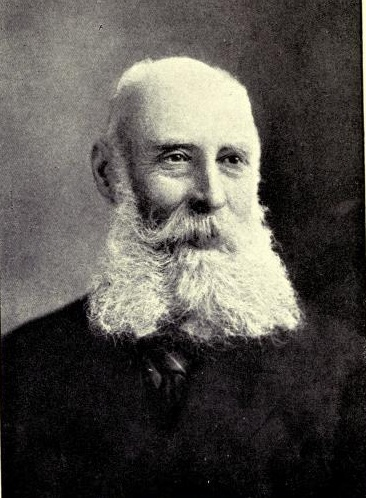
Dr. Thomas Dwight, 1843–1911.
