= Warren Anatomical Museum =

Museum at Harvard Medical School

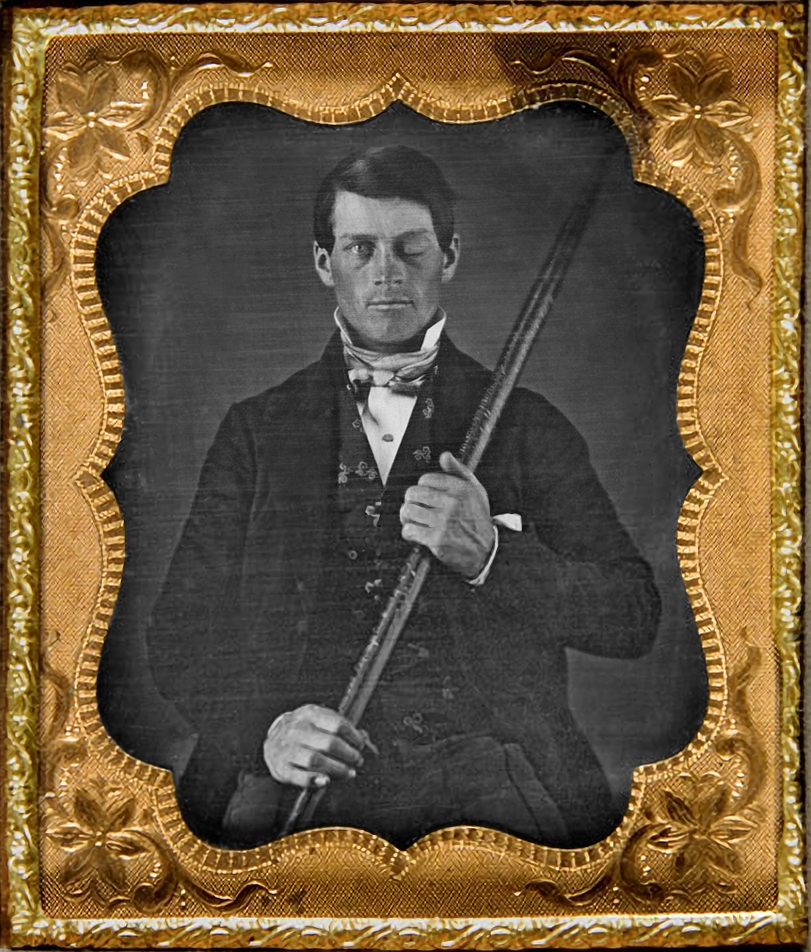
Phineas Gage

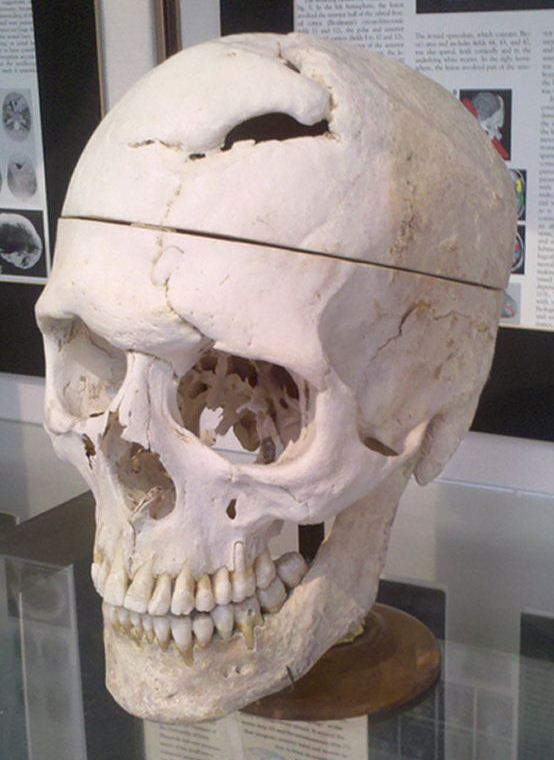
Skull of Phineas Gage

The Warren Anatomical Museum, part of Harvard Medical School's Countway Library of Medicine, was founded in 1847 by Harvard professor John Collins Warren, whose personal collection of 160 unusual and instructive anatomical and pathological specimens form the nucleus of the museum's 15,000-item collection.

The museum's first curator was J.B.S. Jackson. The museum became a part of Countway Library's Center for the History of Medicine in 2000.

Warren also has objects significant to medical history, such as the inhaler used during the first public demonstration of ether-assisted surgery in 1846 (on loan to the Massachusetts General Hospital since 1948), and the skull of Phineas Gage, who survived a large iron bar being driven through his brain.

== Renovations ==
The medical library began a multi-floor renovation in August 2019 requiring the temporary deinstallation of the museum gallery. The renovation completed in spring 2021. Another renovation was performed from February to September 2023 which added seating areas and classroom space to the library.

== See also ==
- William Fiske Whitney
- Harvard Dental Museum
