= John Collins Warren (surgeon, born 1778) =

American surgeon (1778–1856)

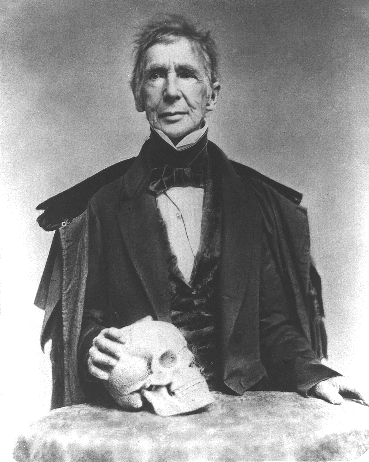
- Dr. John Collins Warren c. 1850
- Born: August 1, 1778; Boston, Massachusetts, United States
- Died: May 4, 1856 (aged 77); Boston, Massachusetts, United States
- Education: Harvard Medical School
- Known for: Involvement in development of early modern anesthesia
- Scientific career
- Fields: Surgery, anatomy

John Collins Warren (August 1, 1778 – May 4, 1856) was an American surgeon. He was a founder of The New England Journal of Medicine and was the third president of the American Medical Association. He was the first dean of Harvard Medical School and a founding member of the Massachusetts General Hospital. In 1846 he gave permission to William T.G. Morton to provide ether anesthesia while Warren performed a minor surgical procedure. News of this first public demonstration of surgical anesthesia quickly circulated around the world.

== Biography ==
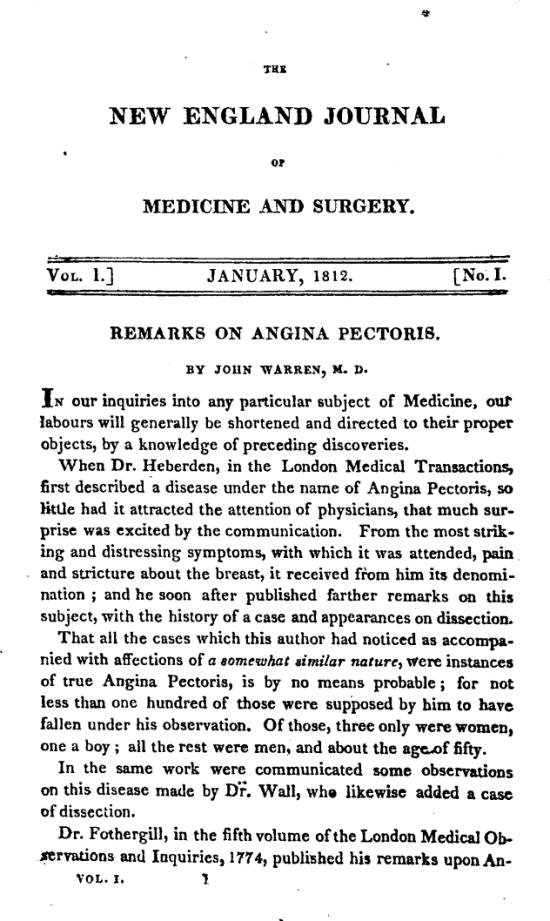
Dr. Warren's article "Remarks on Angina Pectoris" in the first volume of The New England Journal of Medicine and Surgery in January 1812

Born in Boston, he was the son of John Warren, well-known doctor, Harvard professor, and a founder of the Harvard Medical School and the nephew of Dr. Joseph Warren. While attending Harvard College, he co-founded the Hasty Pudding Club in 1795. He graduated in 1797, then began the study of medicine with his father. In 1799, he continued his medical studies in London and Paris and Edinburgh, including work with the pioneer anatomist Sir Astley Cooper (1768–1841). He graduated with an M.D. from the University of Edinburgh Medical School in 1801. Upon his return to America in 1802, Warren entered into partnership with his father and also assisted him with anatomical lectures, dissections, and demonstrations at Harvard Medical School.

By 1806, Warren had begun performing cataract extractions for a condition which was most likely angle-closure glaucoma.

He was named adjunct professor of Anatomy and Surgery in 1806, then, at his father's death in 1815, assumed the Hersey Professorship of Anatomy and Surgery, which post he held until retirement in 1847. During this time, Warren played a leading role in establishing New England's first medical journal, The New England Journal of Medicine and Surgery (first issue January 1812), which subsequently evolved into today's New England Journal of Medicine. He was also active in the Anthology Club.

Warren was the first dean of Harvard Medical School (1816–1819) and promoted its move from Cambridge to Boston. Harvard presented him with an honorary medical degree in 1819. He was a founding member of Massachusetts General Hospital and served as the facility's first surgeon. He held an appointment on the hospital staff until 1853 and was then on its Board of Consultation until his death. He was also a member of the Boston Society of Natural History. He became a member in 1834, and became the president on May 5, 1847. He held this position until his death. Over the course of his long career, Warren assembled an extraordinary teaching collection of anatomical and pathological specimens, which he presented to Harvard in 1847 along with $5000. This was the beginning of the Warren Anatomical Museum.

=== Warren and anesthesia ===
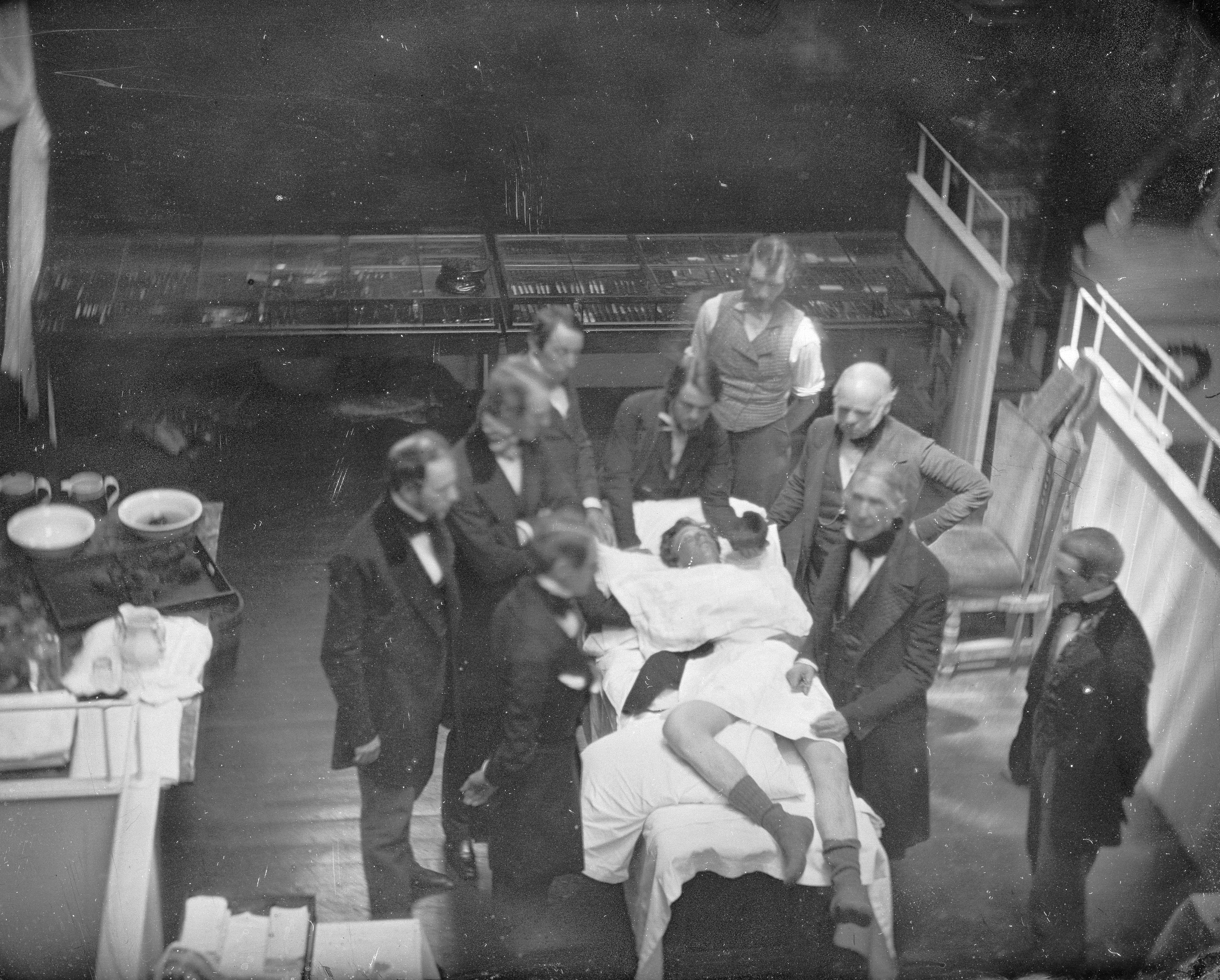
Historic image of an early ether operation, 3 July 1847; daguerreotype by Southworth & Hawes.

Warren was involved not once but twice in the earliest history of anesthesia. The first incident was a failed demonstration of nitrous-oxide by dentist Horace Wells on January 20, 1845. Although Warren did not believe that the anesthesia would work, he arranged for a demonstration at Massachusetts General Hospital. Warren presented Wells to his students but the patient who had been scheduled that morning, for an amputation, refused to be operated on. Warren then asked his students if anybody needed a tooth extracted and one student agreed. Unfortunately the gas was not properly administered. The student suffered normal levels of pain, thus discrediting Wells and nitrous-oxide as an anesthetic. In fact, Warren wrote that he forgot that this operation even happened, as he was "very much occupied at the time" and didn't recall it until Wells himself mentioned it in 1847.

On October 16, 1846, Warren again agreed to perform a public demonstration of a surgical operation, with anesthesia, on a patient, this time under ether anesthesia administered by Wells' colleague and competitor, William T.G. Morton. Warren was, at this time, 68 years of age. The operation lasted about ten minutes and the patient was seemingly unconscious for its duration. After Warren had finished, and the patient had regained consciousness, Warren asked the patient how he felt. Reportedly, the patient answered: "Feels as if my neck's been scratched". Warren then stated to his audience "Gentlemen, this is no Humbug," although this proclamation is disputed. His personal journal for this day records, "Did an interesting operation at the Hospital this morning, while the patient was under the influence of Dr. Morton's preparation to prevent pain. The substance employed was sulphuric ether." Warren was quick to see the remarkable advantages offered by ether in surgical procedures, and he then championed the cause of etherization through his work and publications.

Mindful of the potential importance of the demonstration, Warren invited noted photographers Southworth & Hawes to document the surgery via a re-enactment. In subsequent months, they made a series of daguerreotypes of actual operations.

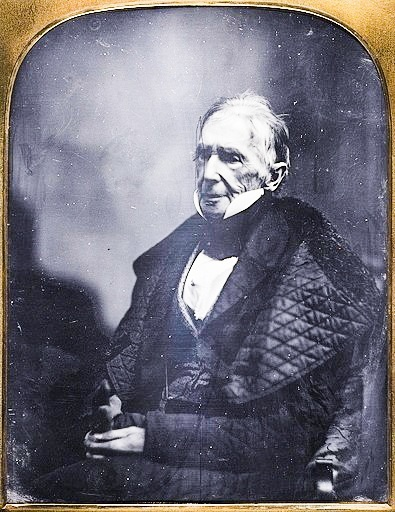
Daguerreotype of John Collins Warren, c. 1855, attributed to Josiah Johnson Hawes

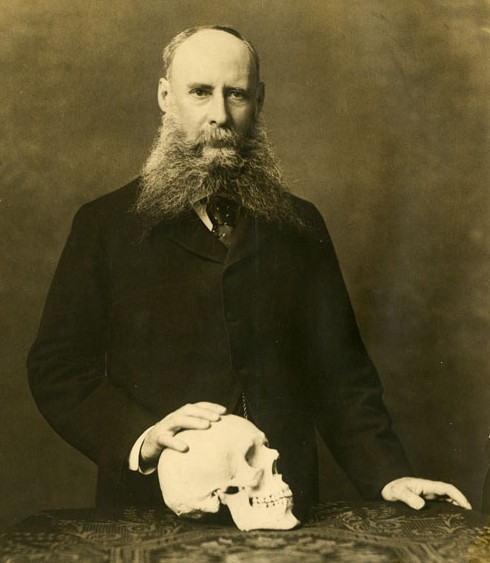
Dr Warren's grandson Dr. Thomas Dwight with a skull 1896

== Personal life ==
Warren was twice married, and twice widowed. His first wife was Susan Powell Mason (1780–1840) whom he married 17 Nov 1803 at Boston and had six children: John Warren (b.1803-died young), Susan Powell Warren Lyman (1806–1856), Jonathan Mason Warren (1811–1867), James Sullivan Warren (1812–1867), Mary Collins Warren Dwight (1816-1900), and Emily Appleton (1818–1905). He married his second wife, Anna Winthrop (1803–1850), on October 17, 1843.

Warren died from pericarditis on May 4, 1856, at his home at 2 Park Street in Boston. It was believed for over 100 years that his remains laid in his memorial tomb at Forest Hills Cemetery in Jamaica Plain, MA but in fact his remains are divided; his skeleton is in a coffin-like box at Harvard's Warren Museum, since he donated his body to Harvard Medical School for research, and his so-called "morbid parts" [i.e. flesh] only were interred in the tomb.

== Honors ==
Warren was elected a Fellow of the American Academy of Arts and Sciences in 1808. In 1818, Warren was elected as a member to the American Philosophical Society. He was elected as an honorary member of the Massachusetts Society of the Cincinnati in 1845. He was elected a member of the American Antiquarian Society on April 30, 1856, but died soon after on the 4th of May. No known correspondence exists regarding this matter, so Warren's wishes regarding membership are unknown.

== Selected works ==
- Description of an Egyptian mummy, presented to the Massachusetts General Hospital: with an account of the operation of embalming in ancient and modern times. Boston, 1824?
- A comparative view of the sensorial and nervous systems in men and animals. Boston, J. W. Ingraham, 1822.
- Etherization: with Surgical Remarks. Boston, Ticknor, 1848.
- Effects of chloroform and of strong chloric ether, as narcotic agents. Boston, Ticknor, 1849.
- The preservation of health. With remarks on constipation, old age, use of alcohol in the preparation of medicines. Boston, Ticknor, Reed and Fields, 1854.
- Remarks on some fossil impressions in the sandstone rocks of Connecticut River. Boston, Ticknor and Fields, 1854.
- The Mastodon giganteus of North America. 2d ed., with additions. Boston, Wilson, 1855.

== See also ==
- Boston Medical Library (1805–26), co-founded by Warren
