= Jonathan Mason Warren =

American surgeon

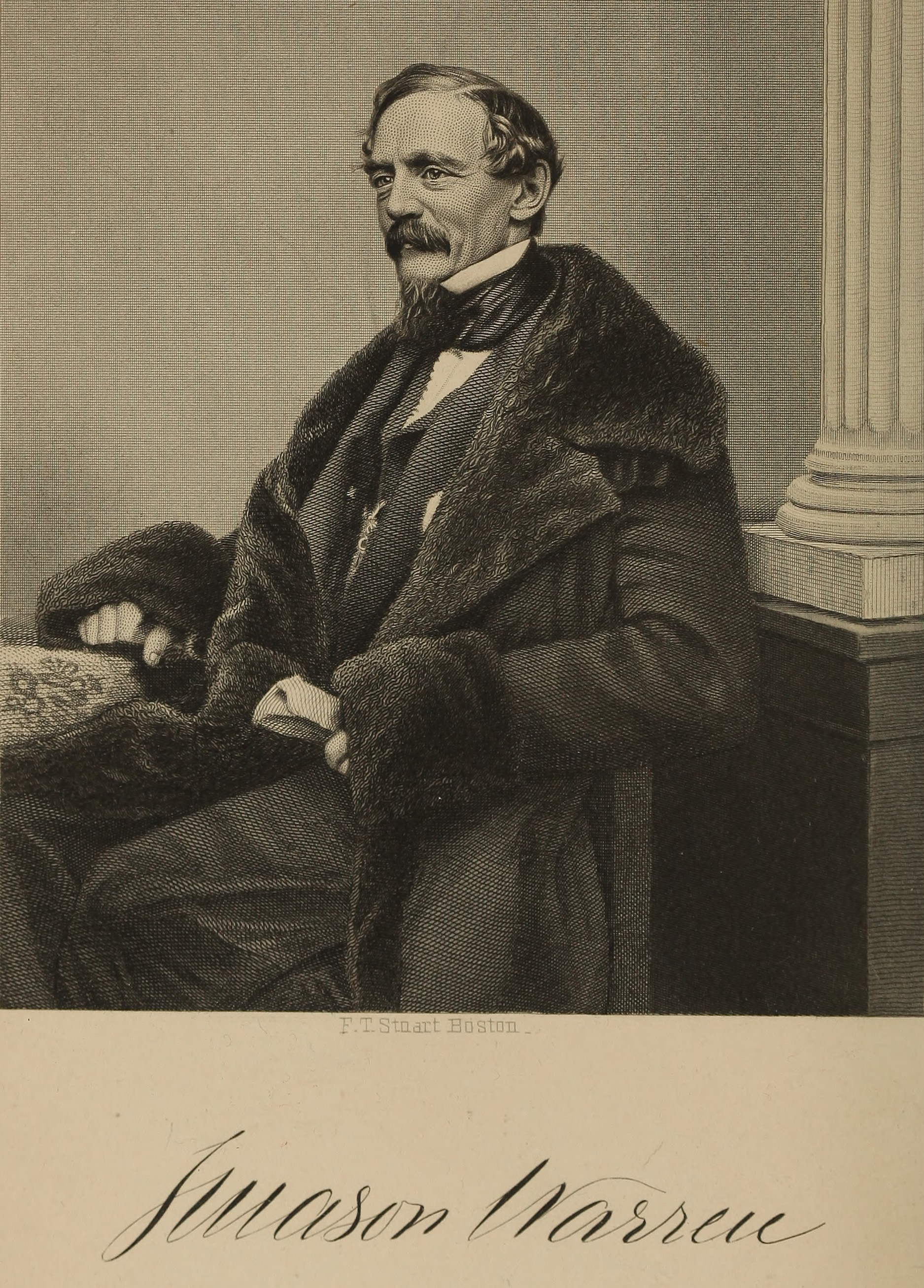
- Born: February 5, 1811; Boston, Massachusetts
- Died: August 9, 1867 (aged 56); Boston, Massachusetts
- Spouse: Anna Casper Crowninshield

Jonathan Mason Warren (February 5, 1811 – August 19, 1867) was an American surgeon. He specialized in plastic and reconstructive surgery. He is known to be the first person to perform rhinoplasty in the United States.

== Biography ==
He was born to Susan Powell Mason and John Collins Warren on February 5, 1811, in the house located at No. 2 Park Street, Boston.

He entered the Boston Latin School in 1820 and graduated in 1825. After studying under a private tutor for two years, he entered Harvard College in 1827. But due to his health, he left Harvard after three months. In the spring of 1828, he began his medical studies under the direction of his father. In the fall of 1830 he entered the Harvard Medical School, and received an MD degree in 1832 at the age of 21.

In March 1832, he left Boston to study in Europe, mostly in Paris. He studied alongside other American students such as Henry Ingersoll Bowditch, Oliver Wendel Holmes and Robert William Hooper, who were also seeking medical education in the region. He visited many notable doctors at the time, including: Astley Cooper, Charles Bell, James Syme and Robert Liston in the United Kingdom, Guillaume Dupuytren, Philibert Joseph Roux, Jacques Lisfranc and Pierre Charles Alexandre Louis in France. Most notably, he witnessed Johann Friedrich Dieffenbach who was on a visit from Vienna, perform his rhinoplastic operations in 1834.

After three years of study, he returned to Boston in June 1835 where he worked in general practice. He specialized in reconstructive surgery; he was one of the first surgeons to perform rhinoplasty operations in the United States, and developed ways to close cleft palate through surgery.

He married Anna "Annie" Caspar Warren (née Crowninshield) on April 30, 1839. One of their children was John Collins Warren Jr.

He received an honorary MA degree from Harvard College in 1844.

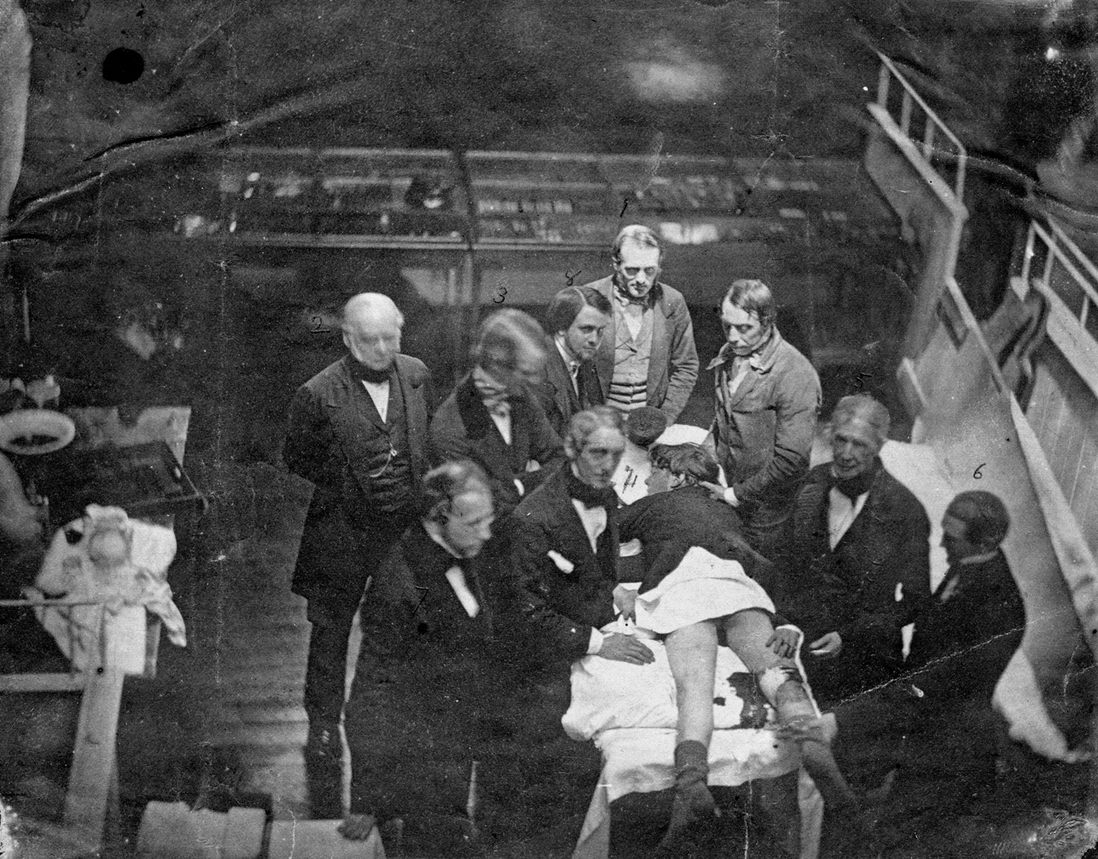
Daguerreotype of an early ether operation, taken by Southworth & Hawes on July 3, 1847. J. Mason (second from bottom left) and his father (second from bottom right) are among the principals portrayed.

In February 1846, he was elected one of the visiting surgeons of the Massachusetts General Hospital. After the first public demonstration of ether anesthesia by W. T. G. Morton, he substituted for Morton's apparatus for cone-shaped sponge which was adapted quickly for the purpose of administering ether, especially to children.

On May 6, 1853, while returning from a meeting of the American Medical Association in New York, he was a passenger on the train which met with the Norwalk rail accident. He survived as well as his family survived, thanks to his being in the middle section of the car at the request of his wife. However, several other members of the association, including William Cecil Dwight and Abel Lawrence Peirson, who were in the same car as the one Warren was in, were killed.

He was a senior surgeon at the hospital for several years until his death. He died on August 9, 1867 in the same house where he was born.

== Gallery ==
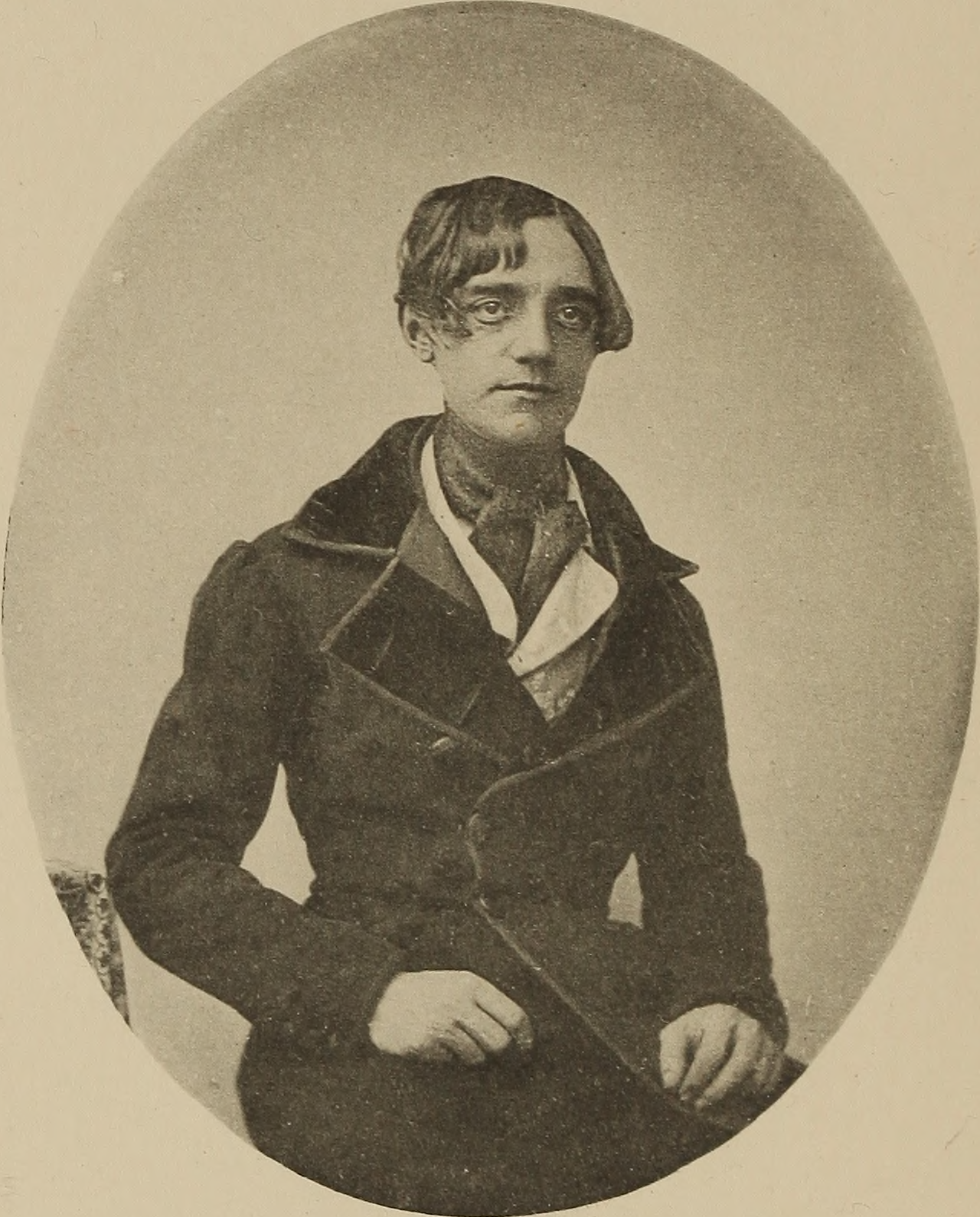
Mason in Paris, 1844.

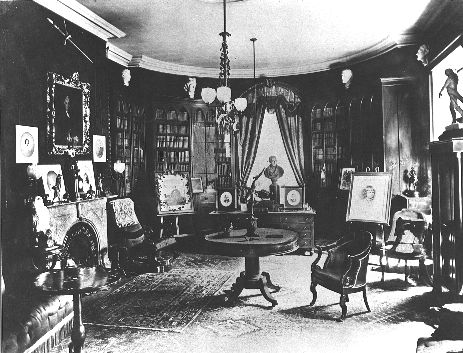
The interior of the house located at 2 Park Street in Boston, the place where he was born and died. Circa 1860.

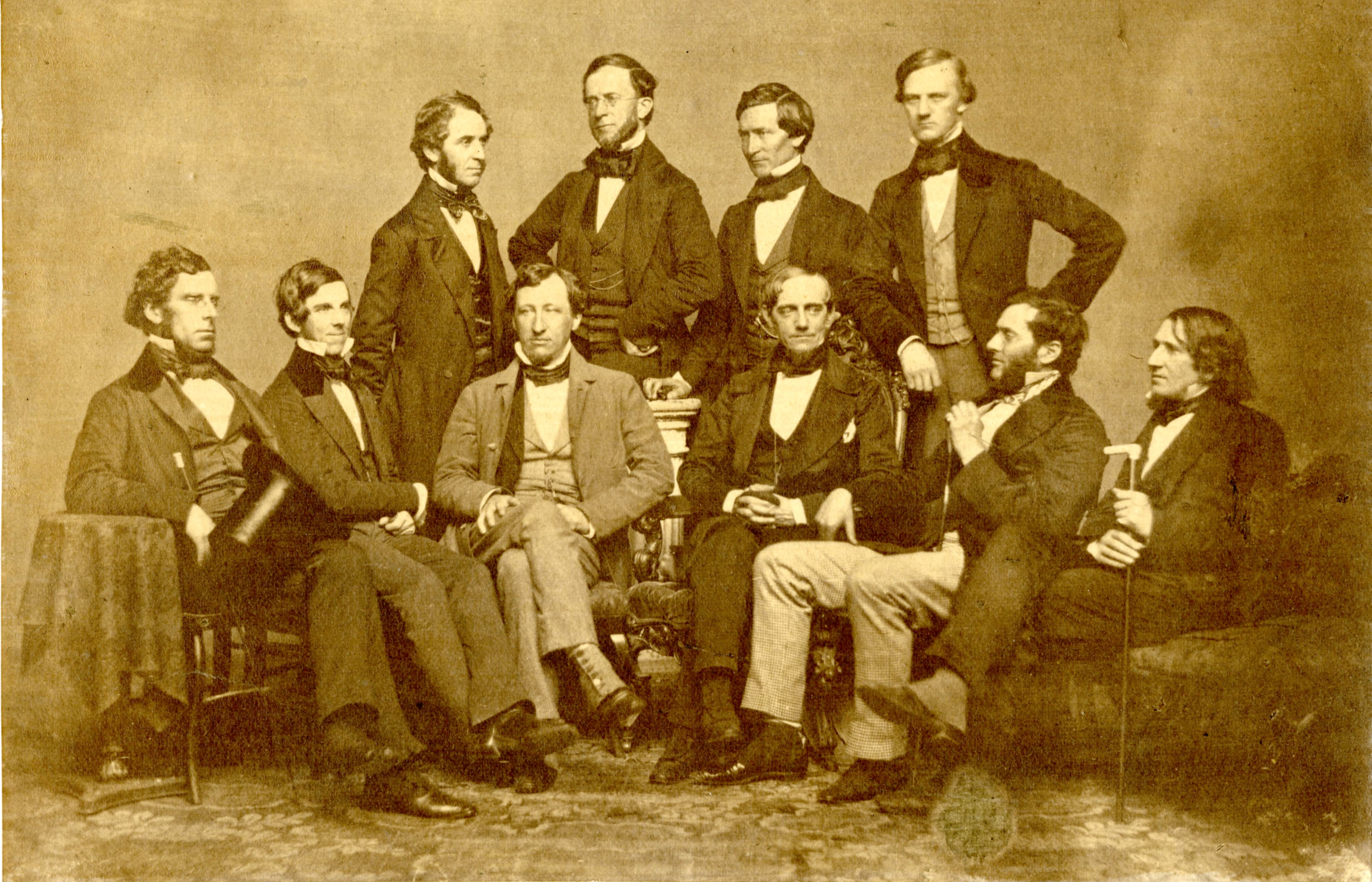
Mason (sitting, third from right) with other members of the Boston Society for Medical Improvement. Shot between 1843 – 1854.

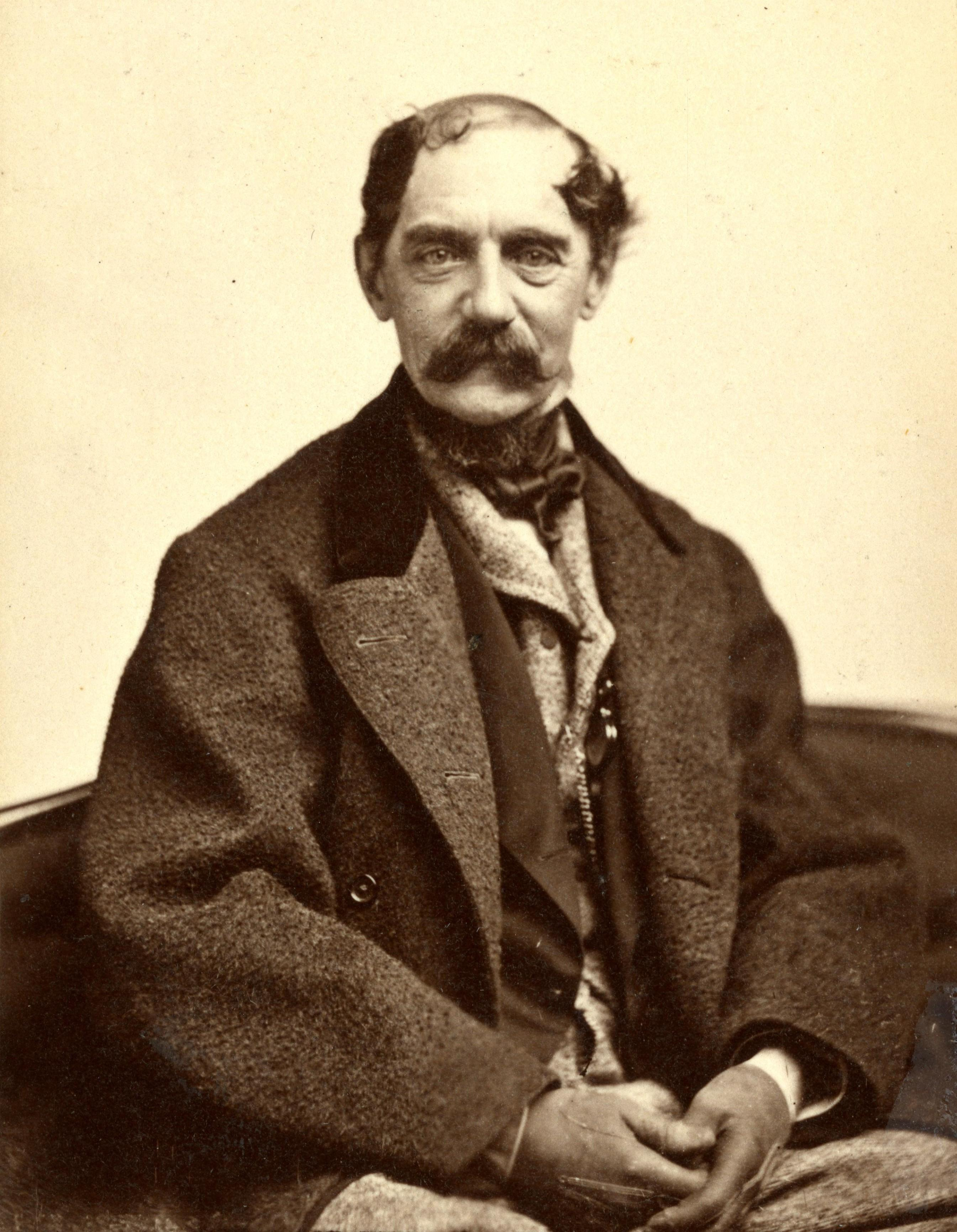
Mason in later years. Circa 1860.

== Selected writings ==
- Warren, Jonathan Mason (March 8, 1837). "Rhinoplastic Operation". The Boston Medical and Surgical Journal. 16 (5): 69–79. doi:10.1056/NEJM183703080160501.
- Warren, Jonathan Mason (April 1843). "Operations for Fissure of the Soft and Hard Palate". The New England Quarterly Journal of Medicine and Surgery. 1 (4): 538–547.
- Warren, Jonathan Mason (May 25, 1864). Recent progress in surgery : the annual address delivered before the Massachusetts Medical Society. U.S. National Library of Medicine. Boston: Printed by David Clapp.

== Sources ==
- Goldwyn, Robert M. (January 1968). "JONATHAN MASON WARREN AND HIS CONTRIBUTIONS TO PLASTIC SURGERY:". Plastic and Reconstructive Surgery. 41 (1): 1–7. doi:10.1097/00006534-196801000-00001. ISSN 0032-1052.
