= John Warren (surgeon, born 1753) =

American surgeon (1753–1815)

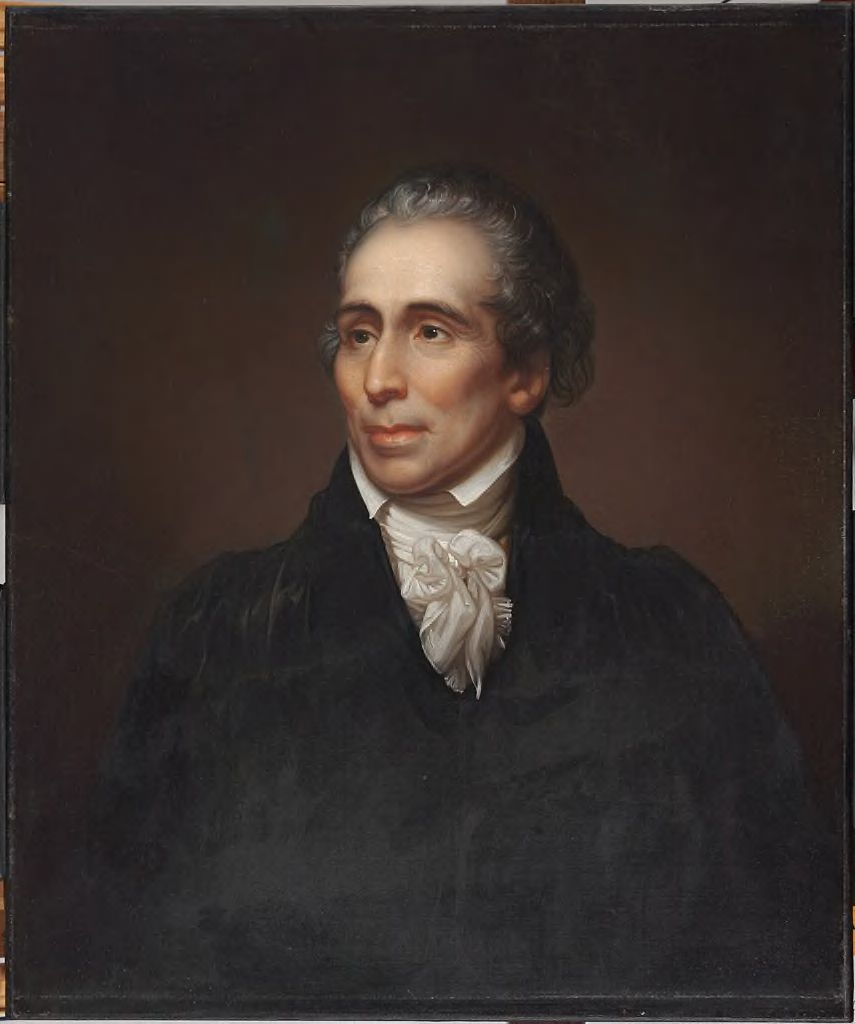
- Portrait of John Warren by Rembrandt Peale
- Born: July 27, 1753; Roxbury, Province of Massachusetts Bay, British America
- Died: April 4, 1815 (aged 61); Boston, Massachusetts, United States
- Resting place: St. Paul's Church, Boston
- Education: Roxbury Latin School
- Alma mater: Harvard University
- Occupation: Physician
- Relatives: Dr. Joseph Warren

John Warren (July 27, 1753 – April 4, 1815) was a Continental Army surgeon during the American Revolutionary War, founder of the Harvard Medical School and the younger brother of Dr. Joseph Warren.

== Early life ==
Warren was born in Roxbury, Massachusetts, and studied at The Roxbury Latin School after which he proceeded to Harvard College where he graduated in 1771. He studied medicine under his elder brother Joseph, later becoming a renowned doctor in Boston.

== Military activities ==
Warren joined Colonel Pickering's Regiment in 1773 as an army surgeon. On June 17, 1775, he was in Cambridge tending to the wounded coming in from the Battle of Bunker Hill on Breed's Hill over four miles away. Worried about his brother Joseph, who had joined the fighting and died, Warren went to search for him after the battle was over. A British sentry told John he could not pass and then bayoneted him as a warning, forcing the depressed Warren to go back to Cambridge.

After his brother's death, Warren volunteered for service and was made a senior surgeon at the hospital in Cambridge. He became surgeon of the general hospital on Long Island in 1776 during General Washington's defense there. He also served at the Battle of Trenton and the Battle of Princeton.

Warren returned to Boston in 1777 to continue his medical practice while still serving as a military surgeon in the army hospital there.

== Civilian practice ==
Warren became very successful in the years after the war, performing one of the first abdominal operations in America. In 1780 he began teaching a course on dissections and founded Harvard Medical School in 1782. He was also one of the founders of the Massachusetts Medical Society in 1781 and the Boston Medical Society in 1780. He was known as an excellent teacher, giving "eloquent" lectures. He was elected a Fellow of the American Academy of Arts and Sciences in 1781.

== Later life ==
While Warren had suffered from heart disease for many years, he died on April 4, 1815, from inflammation of the lungs at age 61. He was buried in the former crypt of the St. Paul's Church in Boston. When church and family crypts were cleared by order of the town for public health reasons, later in the 1800s, his buried remains were removed to Forest Hills Cemetery. Plaques in the church still commemorate him, and other members of his family.

== Personal ==
Coat of Arms of John Warren

Dr. Warren was raised in a Congregational home; some members of his family, including his son John Collins Warren, later became associated with the Anglican church. He was given to bouts of depression, perhaps as a result of his heart disease, to the extent that he lost the will to live to an old age. He was said to be generous and charitable. Warren was of middle height, and carried himself with a military bearing of a gentleman, but with an agreeable nature.

Warren was married to Abigail Collins, the daughter of Rhode Island Governor John Collins. His son, Dr. John Collins Warren succeeded him as professor of surgery and anatomy.

His brother, Joseph, was a character in Esther Forbes' 1943 novel Johnny Tremain although it is possible that the character could easily have been based on John himself. Both he and his brother were army surgeons in the early revolutionary war. His brother was joined in the fighting at the Battle at Bunker Hill while he mended the wounded from the battle in Cambridge.

Both Joseph and John Warren were active Freemasons. John served as Grand Master of the Massachusetts Grand Lodge (Antients) for two non-consecutive terms, 1783–84 and 1787-88. He was reelected in 1788, but declined the honor. John was present in 1792 when the Massachusetts Grand Lodge and St. John's Grand Lodge (Moderns) united to form the Grand Lodge of Masons in Massachusetts, and installed John Cutler as the first Grand Master of the united Grand Lodge. John Warren Lodge in Hopkinton is named after him.

== Sources ==
- John Warren Biography (1753–1815)
