= Robert William Hooper =

American physician (1810–1885)

- Born: October 24, 1810; Marblehead, Massachusetts, U.S.
- Died: April 13, 1885 (aged 74); Cambridge, Massachusetts, U.S.
- Education: Harvard College, Harvard Medical School, Queen's University of Ireland
- Occupations: Physician, surgeon
- Spouse: Ellen Sturgis (m. 1837; died 1848)
- Children: 3

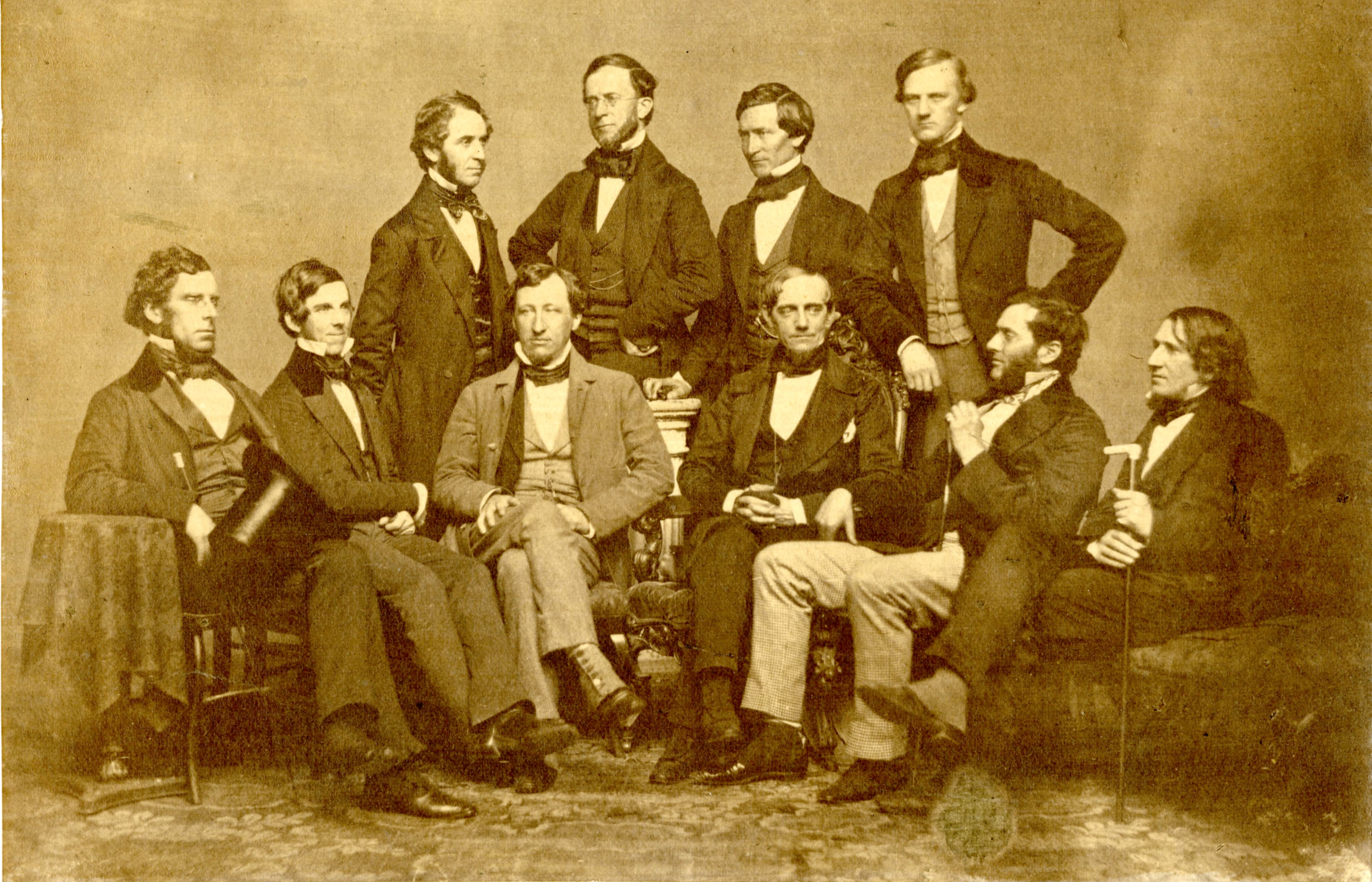
Robert William Hooper (standing, second from left) with the members of the Boston Society for Medical Improvement.

Robert William Hooper (October 24, 1810 – April 13, 1885) was an American medical doctor.

Hooper was born in Marblehead, Massachusetts. He entered the Phillips Academy at the age of 12, and graduated in 1826. He graduated from Harvard College in 1830 and later studied throughout Europe starting in 1833. He returned to the United States in 1835 and obtained an MD degree from Harvard Medical School in 1836. He also received an MD degree from Queen's University of Ireland in 1861. In Ireland, it is often given to those who already hold a doctorate.

Hooper married Ellen Sturgis on September 25, 1837. The couple had three children, all of whom outlived him. After Ellen Hooper's death on November 3, 1848, he stopped working as a full-time doctor and took care of children himself. His practice after this point was focused on charitable causes. Henry Adams, who stayed with Hooper before the wedding with his daughter Marian Hooper Adams, commented that he was "a good deal of a slave to his two daughters".

Hooper worked as a surgeon at the Charitable Eye and Ear Infirmary and was a trustee of the Boston Athenaeum for thirty years. He was a member of the Massachusetts Medical Society and American Medical Association. He was elected as a member of the American Academy of Arts and Sciences in 1871.

Hooper died on April 13, 1885, in Cambridge, Massachusetts at the age of 74.
