= Senator Harvey (disambiguation) =

James M. Harvey (1833–1894) was a U.S. Senator from Kansas from 1874 to 1877. Senator Harvey may also refer to:

- Billy Harvey (politician) (1932–2006), Mississippi State Senate
- Derek J. Harvey (fl. 2010s–2020), Montana State Senate
- Edwin B. Harvey (1834–1913), Massachusetts State Senate
- Jonathan Harvey (politician) (1780–1859), New Hampshire State Senate
- Laning Harvey (1882–1942), Pennsylvania Senate
- Louis P. Harvey (1820–1862), Wisconsin State Senate
- Matthew Harvey (1781–1866), New Hampshire State Senate
- Ted Harvey (fl. 1980s–2010s), Colorado State Senate
- W. Brantley Harvey Sr. (1893–1981), South Carolina State Senate
