= Komaroff =

Komaroff is a Russian language surname derived from the word "komar" (Russian: комар) meaning "mosquito". Notable people with the name include:

- Anthony L. Komaroff (born 1941), American physician
- Myra Wolfgang (née Komaroff; 1914–1976), American women's rights activist
- Vasili Komaroff (1871–1923), Russian serial killer

== See also ==
- Trávnik
