= Massachusetts Medical Society =

Medical association in the United States

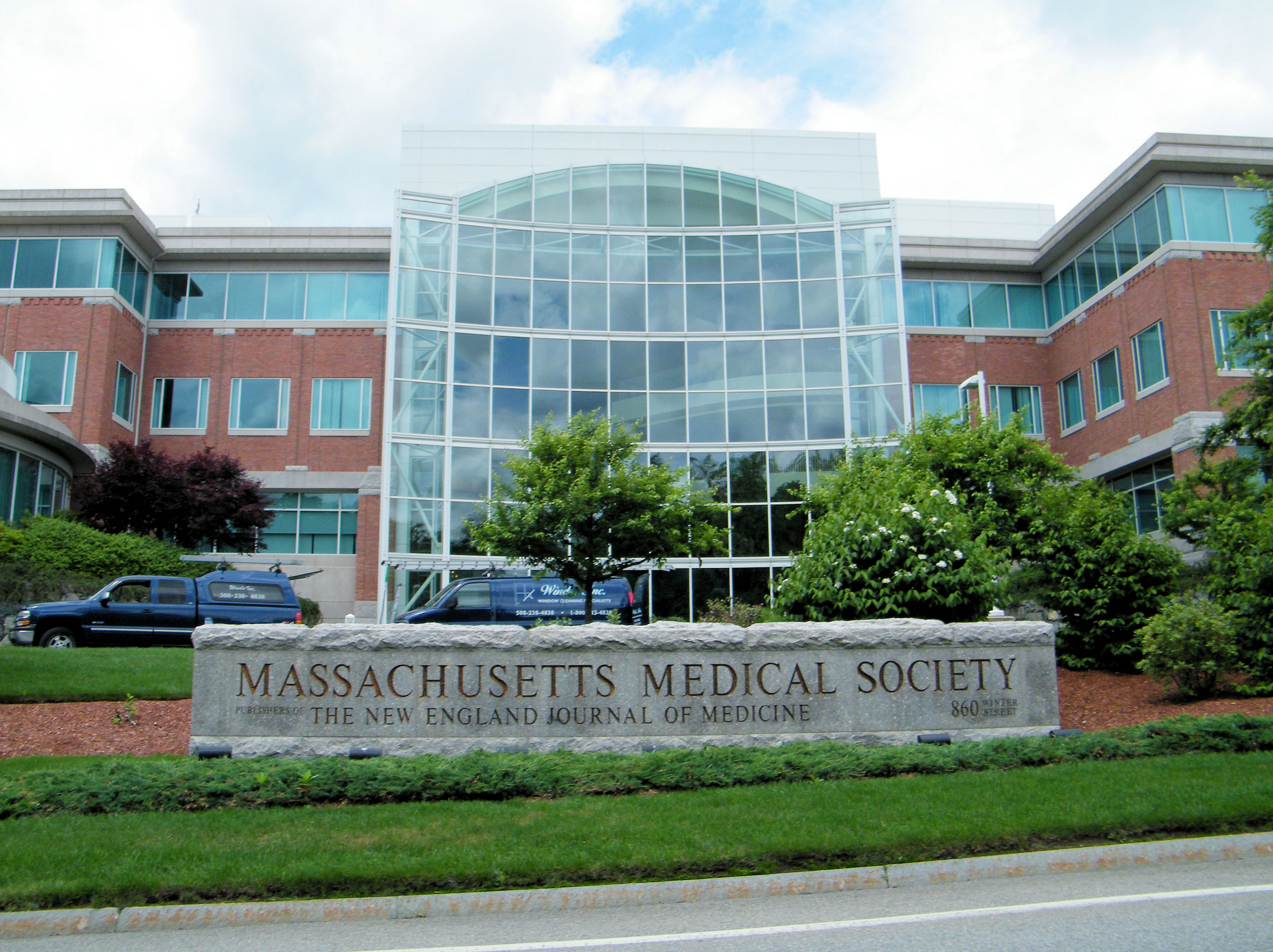
- MMS headquarters in Waltham
- Industry: Industry association
- Founded: 1781; 245 years ago
- Founder: John Warren
- Headquarters: Waltham, Massachusetts, U.S.
- Website: www.massmed.org

The Massachusetts Medical Society (MMS) is the oldest continuously operating state medical association in the United States. Incorporated on November 1, 1781, by an act of the Massachusetts General Court, the MMS is a non-profit organization that consists of more than 25,000 physicians, medical students and residents. It is currently based in Waltham, Massachusetts. The majority of the members live or practice in Massachusetts and the immediate vicinity.

== Publication ==
The Massachusetts Medical Society owns and publishes The New England Journal of Medicine, the most widely read and cited medical journal in the world. The New England Journal of Medicine is also the oldest continuously published and circulating medical journal in the world and has an impact factor of 91.2, the highest among all the medical journals in the world. It also publishes Journal Watch, a group of professional newsletters. NEJM Journal Watch publishes the following topics:

- Cardiology
- Emergency Medicine
- Gastroenterology
- General Medicine
- HIV/AIDS
- Hospital Medicine
- Infectious Diseases
- Neurology
- Oncology and Hematology
- Pediatrics and Adolescent Medicine
- Psychiatry
- Women's Health

In addition to its publishing activities, the key activities of the MMS include medical education for physicians, public health education for physicians and the public, legislative, and regulatory advocacy for physicians, and patients, and health policy research.

== History ==
The charter of the MMS is signed by Samuel Adams as president of the Massachusetts Senate, and John Hancock as Governor of Massachusetts.

John Sprague was a charter member. Edward Augustus Holyoke was the society's first president.

== Presidents ==
- Edward Augustus Holyoke (1782–1784)
- William Kneeland (1784–1786)
- Edward Augustus Holyoke (1782–1784)
- Cotton Tufts (1787–1795)
- Samuel Danforth (1795–1798)
- Isaac Rand (1798–1804)
- John Warren (1804–1815)
- Joshua Fisher (1815–1823)
- John Brooks (1823–1825)
- James Jackson (1825–1832)
- John Collins Warren (1832–1836)
- George Cheyne Shattuck Sr. (1836–1840)
- Rufus Wyman (1840–1842)
- Jacob Bigelow (1842–1847)
- Zadok Howe (1847–1848)
- John Ware (1848–1852)
- George Hayward (1852–1855)
- Elisha Huntington (1855–1857)
- Luther Vose Bell (1857–1859)
- John Homans (1859–1862)
- Josiah Bartlett (1862–1864)
- Augustus Addison Gould (1864–1866)
- Henry Coit Perkins (1866–1868)
- Charles Gideon Putnam (1868–1870)
- Samuel Augustus Fisk (1870–1872)
- George Cheyne Shattuck Jr. (1872–1874)
- Benjamin Eddy Cotting (1874–1876)
- William Cogswell (1876–1878)
- George Hinckley Lyman (1878–1880)
- Henry Willard Williams (1880–1882)
- Alfred Hosmer (1882–1884)
- Charles Dudley Homans (1884–1886)
- Thomas Hovey Gage (1886–1888)
- David Williams Cheever (1888–1890)
- Amos Howe Johnson (1890–1892)
- James Clarke White (1892–1894)
- Franklin Kittredge Paddock (1894–1896)
- Henry Pickering Walcott (1896–1898)
- Edwin Bayard Harvey (1898–1900)
- Frank Winthrop Draper (1900–1902)
- George Ebenezer Francis (1902–1904)
- Arthur Tracy Cabot (1904–1906)
- George Washington Gay (1906–1908)
- Silas Dean Presbrey (1908–1910)
- George Brune Shattuck (1910–1912)
- Walter Prentice Bowers (1912–1914)
- Charles Francis Withington (1914–1916)
- Samuel Bayard Woodward (1916–1919)
- Alfred Worcester (1919–1921)
- John Washburn Bartol (1921–1923)
- Enos H. Bigelow (1924–1925)
- James S. Stone (1925–1927)
- John H. Birnie (1927–1929)
- Robert B. Greenough (1929–1931)
- Halbert G. Stetson (1931–1933)
- William Henry Robey (1933–1935)
- Charles Edward Mongan (1935–1937)
- Channing Frothingham (1937–1939)
- Walter Gray Phippen (1939–1941)
- Frank Roberts Ober (1941–1942)
- George Leonard Schadt (1942–1943)
- Roger Irving Lee (1943–1944)
- Elmer Stanley Bagnall (1944–1945)
- Reginald Fitz (1945–1946)
- Dwight O'Hara (1946–1947)
- Edward Parsons Bagg (1947–1948)
- Daniel Bartholomew Reardon (1948–1949)
- Arthur Wilburn Allen (1949–1950)
- Leland Sterling McKittrick (1950–1951)
- W. Richard Ohler (1951–1952)
- Thomas H. Lanman (1952–1953)
- Frederic Hagler (1953–1954)
- Curtis C. Tripp (1954–1955)
- Conrad Wesselhoeft (1955–1956)
- Howard F. Root (1956–1957)
- Patrick J. Sullivan (1957–1958)
- Charles C. Lund (1958–1959)
- Lawrence R. Dame (1959–1960)
- Carl Bearse (1960–1961)
- David W. Wallwork (1961–1962)
- Urban H. Eversole (1962–1963)
- Allan S. Johnson (1963–1964)
- James Marvin Baty (1964–1965)
- Claude E. Welch (1965–1966)
- William Warren Babson (1966–1967)
- Donald A. Nickerson (1967–1968)
- John W. Norcross (1968–1969)
- Jacob H. Fine (1969–1970)
- Lamar Soutter (1970–1971)
- H. Thomas Ballantine Jr. (1971–1972)
- James F. McDonough (1972–1973)
- Bentley P. Colcock (1973–1974)
- John C. Ayres (1974–1975)
- Louis F. Alfano (1975–1976)
- C. Nason Burden (1976–1977)
- John J. Byrne (1977–1978)
- Russell J. Rowell (1978–1979)
- Grant V. Rodkey (1979–1980)
- Frank E. Bixby Jr. (1980–1981)
- Stanley M. Wyman (1981–1982)
- Percy W. Wadman (1982–1983)
- Goodwill M. Stewart (1983–1984)
- Frederick J. Duncan (1984–1985)
- Barbara A. P. Rockett (1985–1987)
- James J. Siragusa (1987–1988)
- Joseph J. O'Connor (1988–1989)
- William G. Lavelle (1989–1990)
- Barry M. Manuel (1990–1991)
- Philip E. McCarthy (1991–1992)
- William E. Callahan (1992–1993)
- Leonard Morse (1993–1994)
- Francis X. Van Houten (1994–1995)
- Guenter L. Spanknebel (1995–1996)
- Joseph M. Heyman (1996–1997)
- Allan H. Goroll (1997–1998)
- Marylou Buyse (1998–1999)
- Jack T. Evjy (1999–2000)
- Virginia T. Latham (2000–2001)
- Francis X. Rockett (2001–2002)
- Charles A. Welch (2002–2003)
- Thomas E. Sullivan (2003–2004)
- Alan C. Woodward (2004–2005)
- Alan M. Harvey (2005–2006)
- Kenneth R. Peelle (2006–2007)
- B. Dale Magee (2007–2008)
- Bruce S. Auerbach (2008–2009)
- Mario E. Motta (2009–2010)
- Alice A. Tolbert Coombs (2010–2011)
- Lynda M. Young (2011–2012)
- Richard V. Aghababian (2012–2013)
- Ronald W. Dunlap (2013–2014)
- Richard S. Pieters (2014–2015)
- Dennis M. Dimitri (2015–2016)
- James S. Gessner (2016–2017)
- Henry L. Dorkin (2017–2018)
- Alain A. Chaoui (2018–2019)
- Maryanne C. Bombaugh (2019–2020)
- David A. Rosman (2020–2021)
- Carole E. Allen (2021–2022)
- Theodore A. Calianos II (2022–2023)
- Barbara S. Spivak (2023–2024)
- Hugh M. Taylor (2024–2025)
- Olivia C. Liao (2025–present)
