= Allan S. Brett =

American physician

- Education: University of Pennsylvania MD, 1976
- Scientific career
- Fields: Internal medicine
- Workplaces: Harvard University, Georgetown University, Washington University in St. Louis

Allen S. Brett is the editor in chief of NEJM Journal Watch, a series of topic-specific newsletters written for physicians and other health professionals. He has been the editor in chief since 1994.

== Early life and education ==
Brett studied at the University of Pennsylvania School of Medicine in Philadelphia, where he was awarded his M.D. in 1976.

== Career ==
Brett is also a professor of medicine, director of the division of general internal medicine and the vice chair of the department of medicine, and a physician at the University of South Carolina.

His academic interests include medical ethics, clinical decision-making, preventive medicine, critical review of the medical literature, and health care reform.

He has served on the faculties at Washington University School of Medicine, Georgetown University School of Medicine, and Harvard Medical School.
