= Ammi B. Young =

American architect (1791–1874)

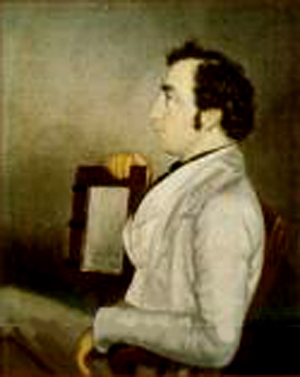
- Born: June 19, 1798; Lebanon, New Hampshire, U.S.
- Died: March 14, 1874 (aged 75); Washington, D.C., U.S.
- Resting place: Oak Hill Cemetery; Washington, D.C., U.S.
- Occupation: Architect
- Buildings: Vermont State House; Shattuck Observatory
- Projects: Oversaw design and construction of all federal buildings as the first Supervising Architect

Ammi Burnham Young (June 19, 1798 – March 14, 1874) (Note: According to his cemetery information his birth date is June 19, 1799, and his death date is March 13, 1874.) was a 19th-century American architect whose commissions transitioned from the Greek Revival to the Neo-Renaissance styles. His design of the second Vermont State House brought him fame and success, which eventually led him to become the first Supervising Architect of the U.S. Treasury Department. As federal architect, he was responsible for creating across the United States numerous custom houses, post offices, courthouses and hospitals, many of which are today on the National Register. His traditional architectural forms lent a sense of grandeur and permanence to the new country's institutions and communities. Young pioneered the use of iron in construction.

== Early life and works ==
Born in Lebanon, New Hampshire, Ammi B. Young was the son of Rebecca Burnham and Samuel Young, a builder-designer of churches, courthouses and academy buildings in the Lebanon area. He showed a talent for mathematics and drawing, and at the age of 14, began work in his father's trade. In 1823, Young married his first wife, Mary Hough of Lebanon. Like many aspiring builder-designers of the day, he learned the classical orders from pattern books by New England architect Asher Benjamin. Indeed, his design for the Federal style First Congregational Church, built in Lebanon in 1828, borrows significantly from Plate K of The American Builder's Companion. Early commissions included dormitories at nearby Dartmouth College, where his brother, Ira Young, was Professor of Natural Philosophy. But the novice architect also learned from working in the Boston office of Alexander Parris, whose characteristic work in granite influenced Young's subsequent governmental commissions.

In 1830, Young opened his own office in Burlington, Vermont, a trade center growing fast since the 1823 opening of the Champlain Canal which connected Lake Champlain with the Hudson River and New York City. Here he designed the 1832 St. Paul's Church in the Gothic Revival style. His first monumental work was the Second Vermont State House, a cruciform Greek Revival structure built between 1833 and 1838, which combined a Doric portico modeled on the Temple of Theseus in Athens, with a low saucer dome inspired by the Pantheon in Rome. The building's granite blocks were hauled to Montpelier on the frozen Winooski River from quarries at Barre. But a fire in 1857 destroyed much of the building, except for the portico and some of the walls. With considerable respect for Young's original design, the Vermont State House was rebuilt, although now with wings extended by a bay, and a cupola crowning the roof – the plan of Thomas Silloway, trained in Young's office from 1847 until 1851. The result was considered by architect Stanford White the finest example of the Greek Revival style in the country.

Entering the 1837 competition to design the Boston Custom House, Young submitted another cruciform scheme combining a Greek Doric portico with a Roman dome. Planned on a large scale at what was then the waterfront, the building reflected the strength and confidence of the young, growing nation. It won, defeating several other entries, including one by Asher Benjamin. Young was appointed supervisor of construction, which took from 1837 until 1847. In 1838, he established a Boston drafting room. The building's 32 columns were each carved from a single piece from Quincy granite. They measured 5 foot 4 inches in diameter, stood 32 feet high, and weighed 42 tons. Purists decried the Roman dome on a Greek form. Far less sympathetic to the building's Greek form, however, would be the soaring Custom House Tower which replaced the dome from 1913 to 1915. Boston's first skyscraper, it was designed by Peabody & Stearns to add both office space and presence to a building obscured by later others.

== Supervising Architect of the Treasury ==
Young entered the 1850 competition to design enlargements to the U.S. Capitol in Washington. Although considered a leading competitor, he lost to Thomas U. Walter. As a sort of compensation, he was appointed in 1852 as the first Supervising Architect of the U.S. Treasury Department, a position created by Thomas Corwin, Secretary of the Treasury during the Fillmore administration. From a studio in the Treasury, Young produced designs and specifications for federal buildings ordered by the government to facilitate its various functions throughout the nation. Mandated to be fire-proof, the custom houses, post offices, courthouses and hospitals he built featured masonry foundations, walls and vaulting, with cast iron interior structural and decorative elements, including columns, stairways and railings. Heavy iron shutters were mounted on the inside of windows. Floors and treads were marble, and roofs were galvanized metal. Column capitols, fascia and pediments on the exterior, when not stone, were cast iron painted to look like stone—which drew criticism of parsimony by the federal architect. Cast iron components were manufactured to Young's specifications in New York state, then shipped to building sites.

At the same time, ongoing modifications to the Treasury Building concerned Young, expected to create working drawings based on plans by Walter. For the South Wing, he invented a column capital which symbolized the department, substituting acanthus leaves of the Corinthian order with eagles and a fist holding a key. Young held the role until he retired on July 24, 1862, dismissed by Salmon P. Chase of the Lincoln administration. Chase's friend from Cincinnati, Isaiah Rogers, succeeded him as Supervising Architect, although the Civil War curtailed the department's activities. Several of Young's buildings would play a part in the rebellion, particularly his custom house in Richmond, Virginia, which served as the Confederate Treasury. When Richmond in April 1865 was evacuated by the Army of Northern Virginia, with orders to burn warehouses and factories, the Richmond Custom House survived the conflagration—a testament to its fire-proofing. Indeed, from its courtroom Jefferson Davis was indicted for treason in May 1866.

Young was awarded honorary degrees (M.A.) from the University of Vermont (1839) and Dartmouth College (1841). He died in Washington, D.C., and is buried in Oak Hill Cemetery in Washington, D.C.

== Buildings ==
- 1828 – First Congregational Church, Lebanon, New Hampshire
  - Thornton Hall, Dartmouth College, Hanover, New Hampshire
  - Wentworth Hall, Dartmouth College, Hanover, New Hampshire
- 1832 – St. Paul's Church, Burlington, Vermont (burned 1971)
- 1833–1838 – Second Vermont State House, Montpelier, Vermont
- 1836–1842 – Treasury Building, Washington, D.C.
- 1837 – Moor's Charity School Dartmouth College, Hanover, New Hampshire (Remodeled 1871 as Chandler Hall, razed 1936)
- 1837–1841 – The Great Stone Dwelling, Enfield Shaker Village, New Hampshire
- 1837–1847 – Boston Custom House, Massachusetts
- 1839–1840 – Reed Hall, Dartmouth College, Hanover, New Hampshire
- 1841 – Timothy Follett House, Burlington, Vermont
- 1842 – John Wheeler House, Burlington, Vermont
- 1843 – Worcester County Courthouse, Worcester, Massachusetts
- 1845 – Campbell-Carter House, Lebanon, New Hampshire
- 1848 – Middlesex County Courthouse, Cambridge, Massachusetts
- 1849 – City Hall, Lawrence, Massachusetts
- 1850 – Courthouse, Lowell, Massachusetts
- 1852 – Loring Hall, Hingham, Massachusetts
- 1853–1889 – Territorial Capital Building, Santa Fe, New Mexico
- 1854 – Shattuck Observatory, Dartmouth College, Hanover, New Hampshire

Buildings while Supervising Architect of the U.S. Treasury Department:

- 1855 – Custom House, Wilmington, Delaware
- 1856 – Appraisers' Store, San Francisco, California
  - Custom House & Post Office, Mobile, Alabama
  - Custom House & Post Office, Barnstable, Massachusetts
  - Federal Courthouse, Buffalo, New York
- 1857 – Cape Flattery Lighthouse, Tatoosh Island, Washington
  - Custom House & Post Office, Belfast, Maine
  - Custom House & Post Office, Bristol, Rhode Island
  - Custom House & Post Office, Burlington, Vermont
  - Custom House & Post Office, Providence, Rhode Island
  - Custom House & Post Office, Sandusky, Ohio
  - Custom House & Post Office, Waldoboro, Maine
  - Custom House & Post Office, Windsor, Vermont
  - New Dungeness Lighthouse, Sequim, Washington
- 1858 – Custom House, Charleston, South Carolina
  - Custom House & Post Office, Alexandria, Virginia
  - Custom House & Post Office, Bath, Maine
  - Custom House & Post Office, Ellsworth, Maine
  - Custom House & Post Office, Galena, Illinois
  - Custom House & Post Office, Georgetown, Washington, D.C.
  - Custom House & Post Office, Gloucester, Massachusetts
  - Custom House & Post Office, Norfolk, Virginia
  - Custom House & Post Office, Oswego, New York
  - Custom House & Post Office, Richmond, Virginia
  - Marine Hospital, Chelsea, Massachusetts
- 1859 – Courthouse & Post Office, Rutland, Vermont (Now Rutland Free Library)
  - Custom House & Post Office, Cleveland, Ohio
  - Custom House & Post Office, Petersburg, Virginia (Now Petersburg City Hall)
  - Custom House & Post Office, Wheeling, West Virginia
  - Marine Hospital, Portland, Maine
- 1860 – Courthouse & Post Office, Indianapolis, Indiana
  - Custom House, Detroit, Michigan
  - Custom House & Post Office, Chicago (Destroyed in Great Fire of 1871)
  - Custom House & Post Office, New Haven, Connecticut
  - Custom House & Post Office, Portsmouth, New Hampshire
- 1861 – Custom House, Galveston, Texas

== Gallery ==
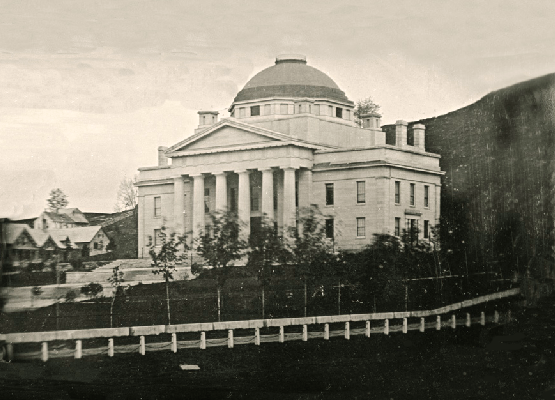
Second Vermont State House as it appeared before the 1857 fire

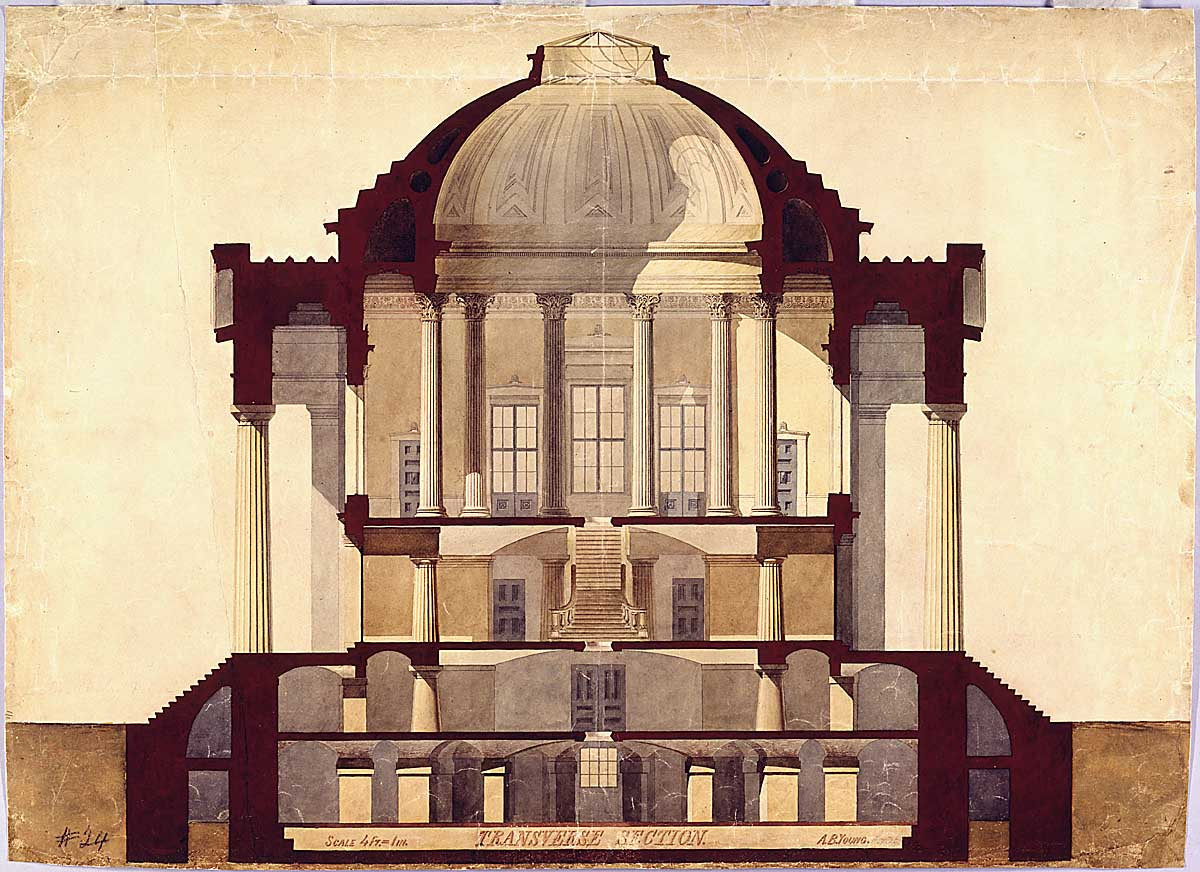
Boston Custom House showing transverse section plan

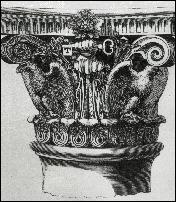
Corinthian-based carved capital by Young for the U.S. Treasury

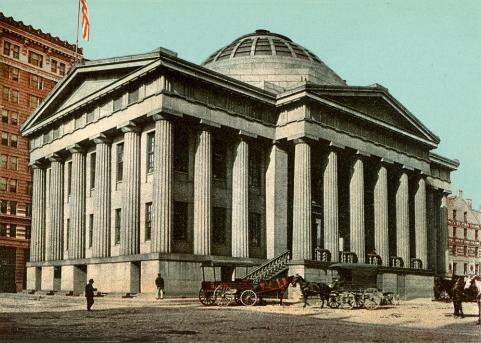
Custom House, Boston, Massachusetts, c. 1905

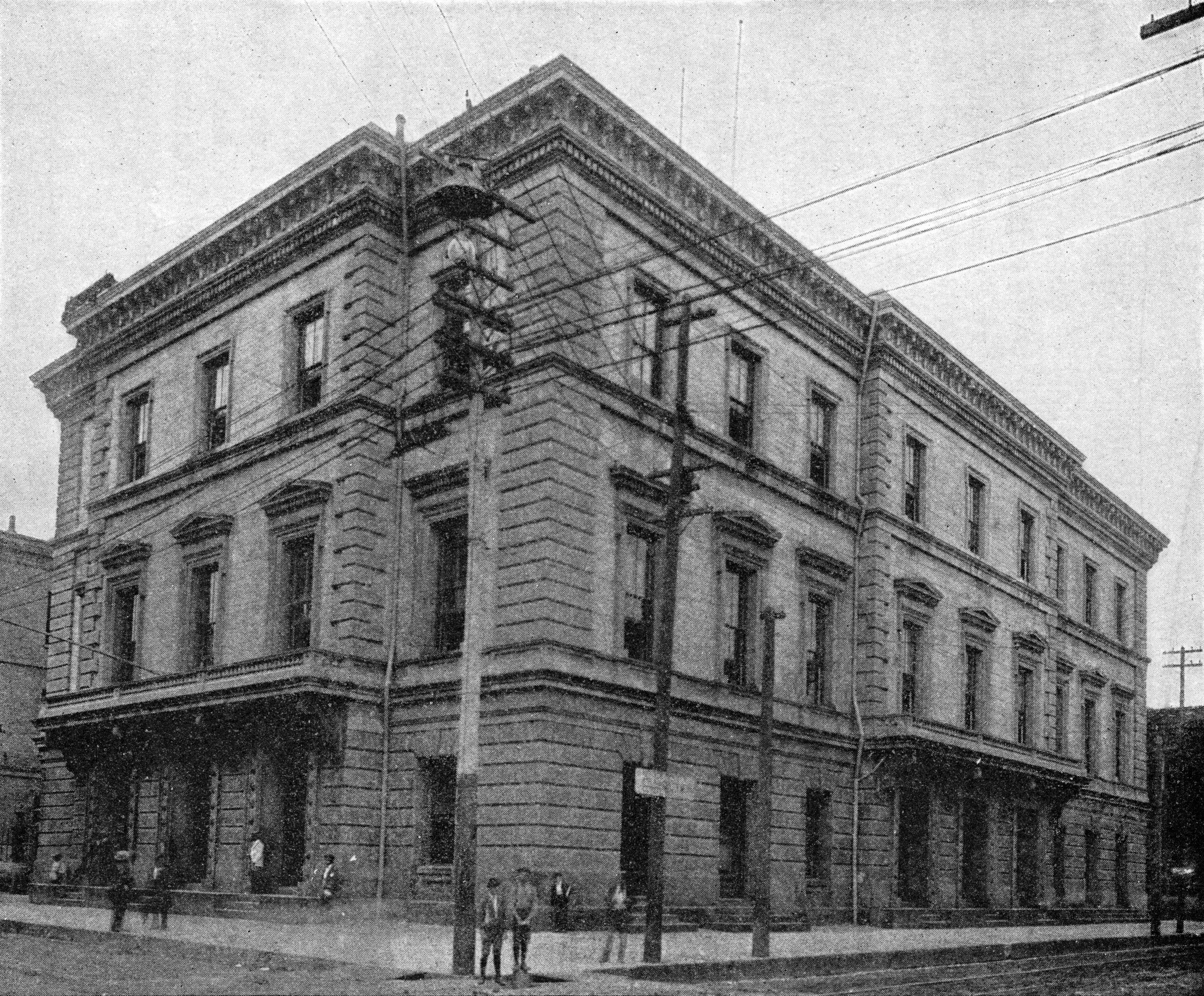
Custom House and Post Office, Mobile, Alabama, in 1901

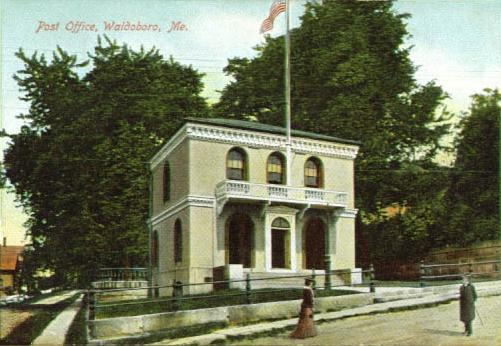
Custom House and Post Office, Waldoboro, Maine, c. 1908

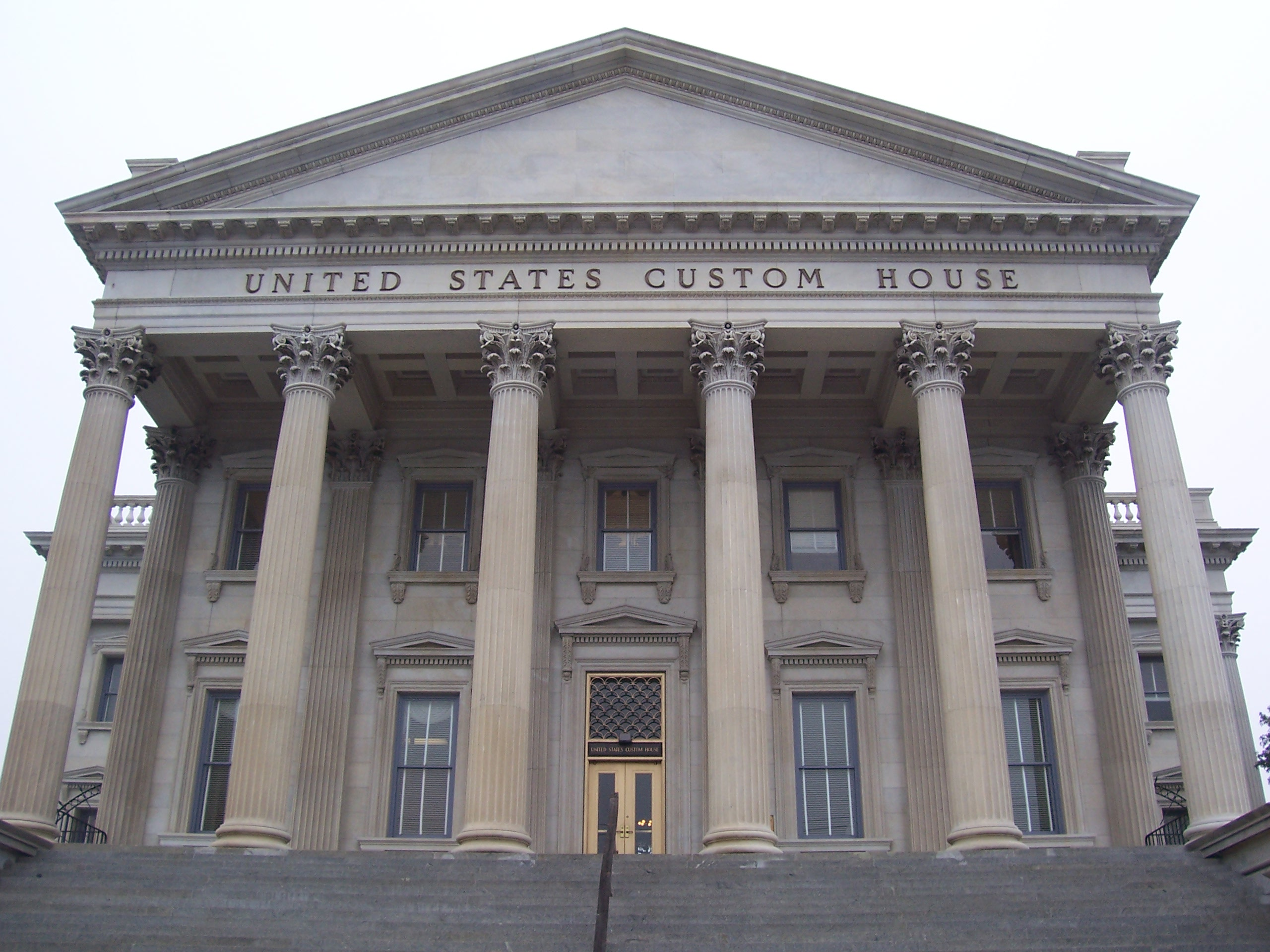
Custom House, Charleston, South Carolina

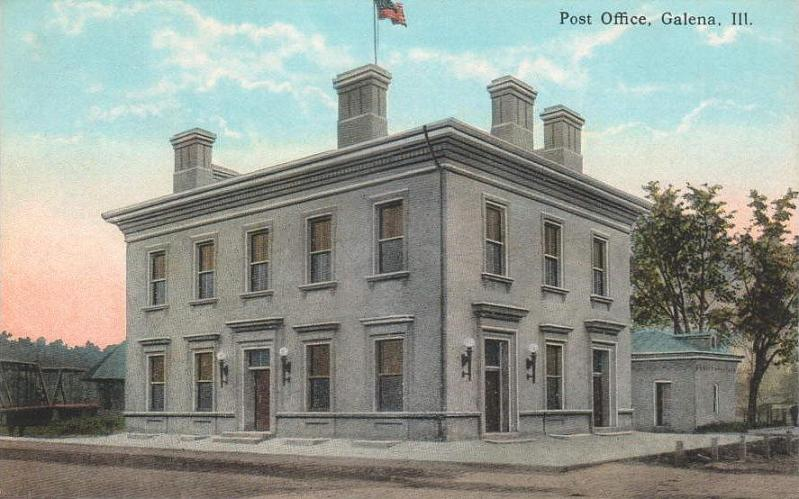
Custom House and Post Office, Galena, Illinois, c. 1912

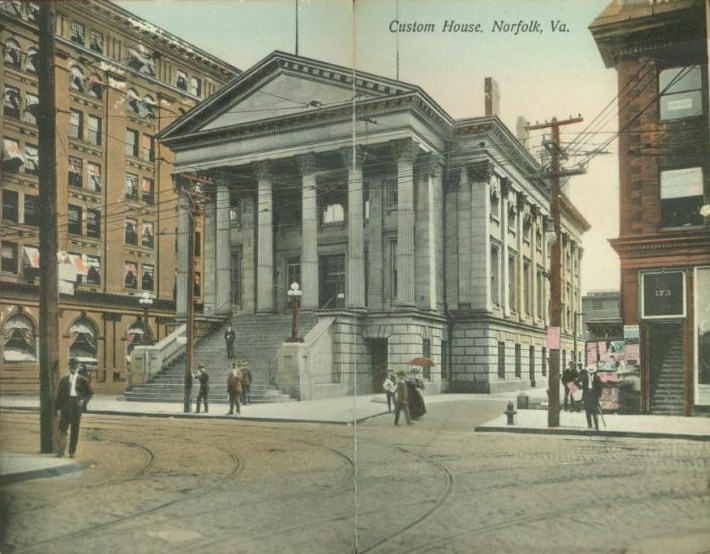
Custom House and Post Office, Norfolk, Virginia, in 1900

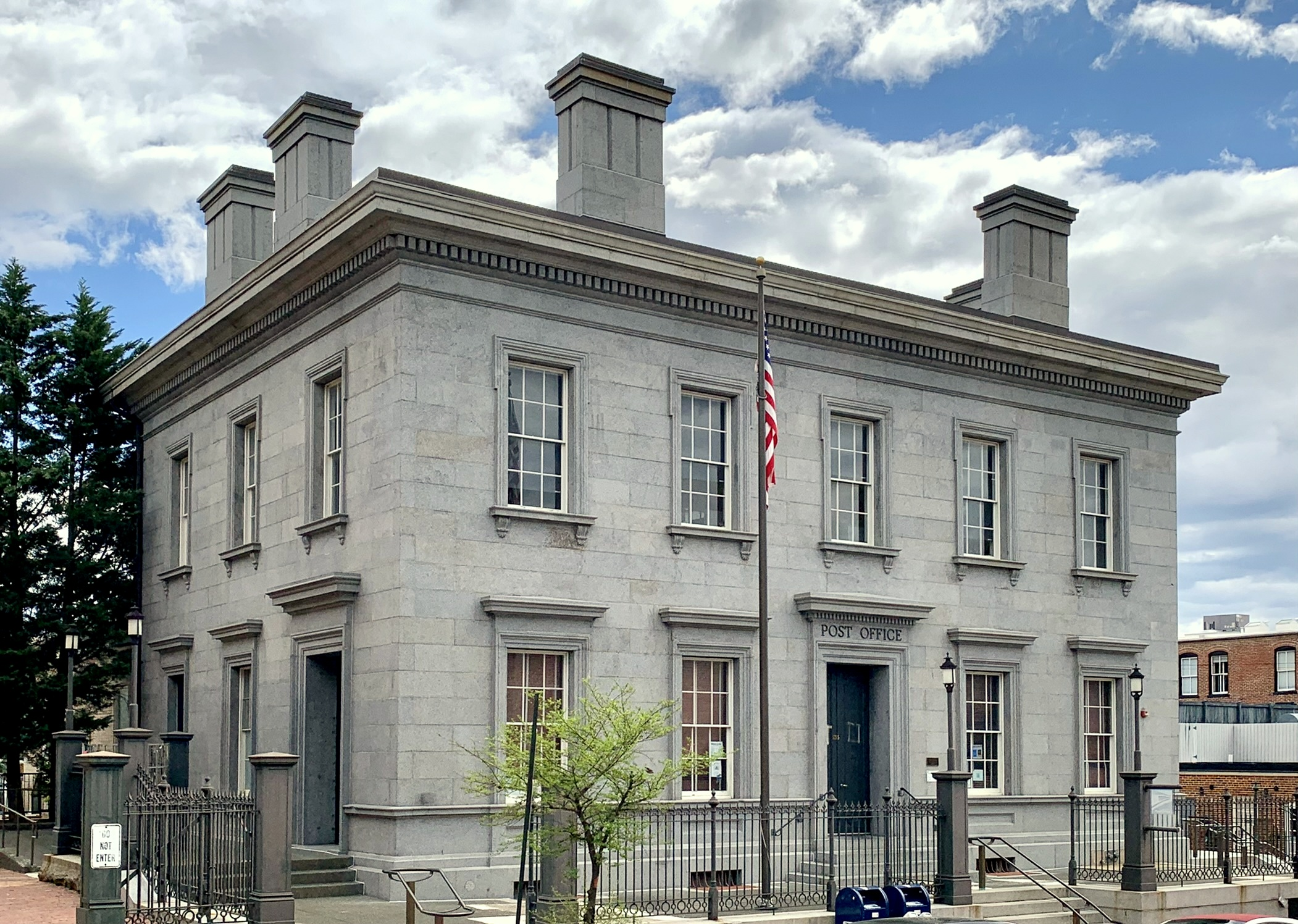
Post Office, Georgetown, Washington, D.C.

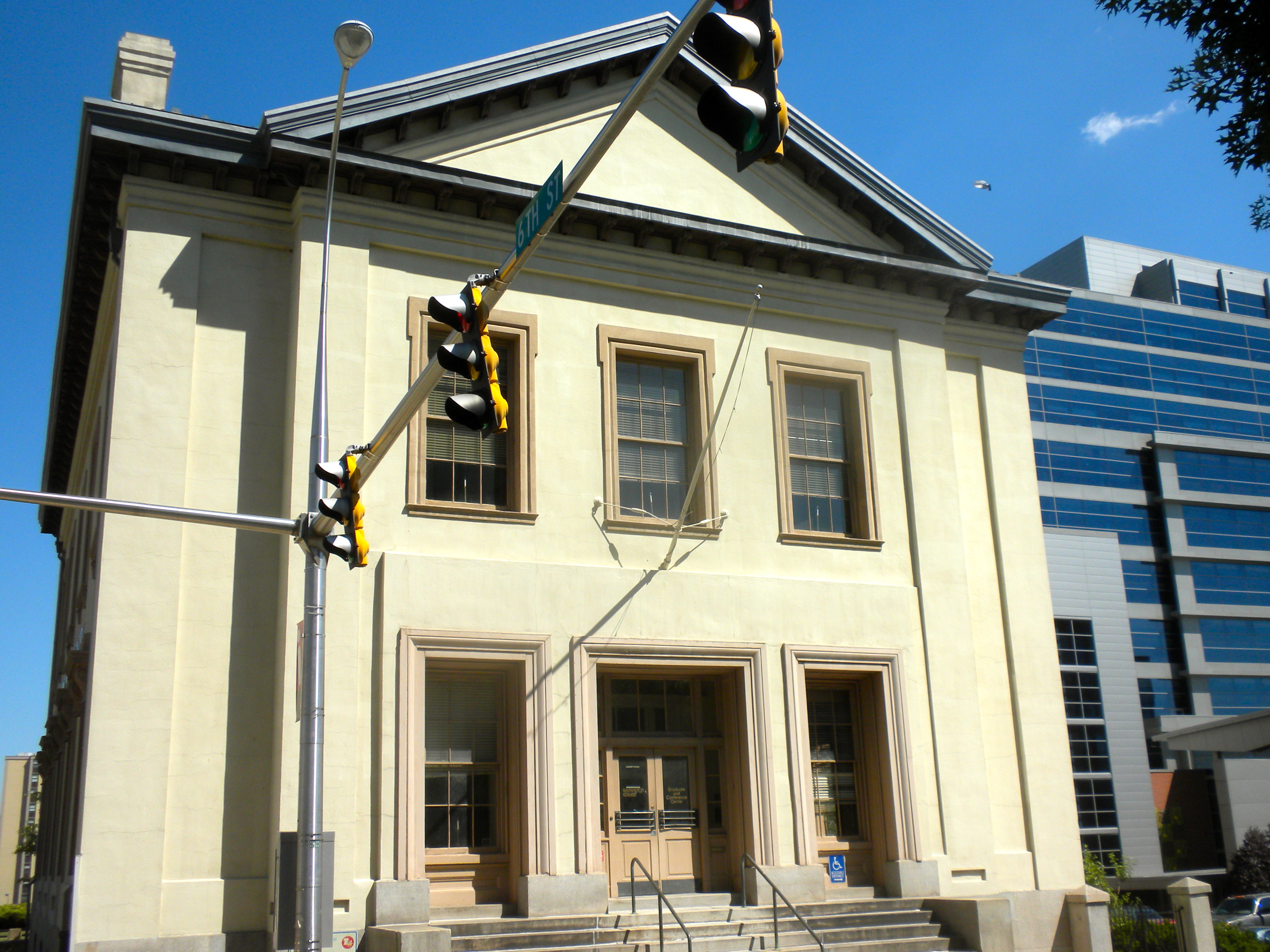
Old Customshouse, Wilmington, Delaware

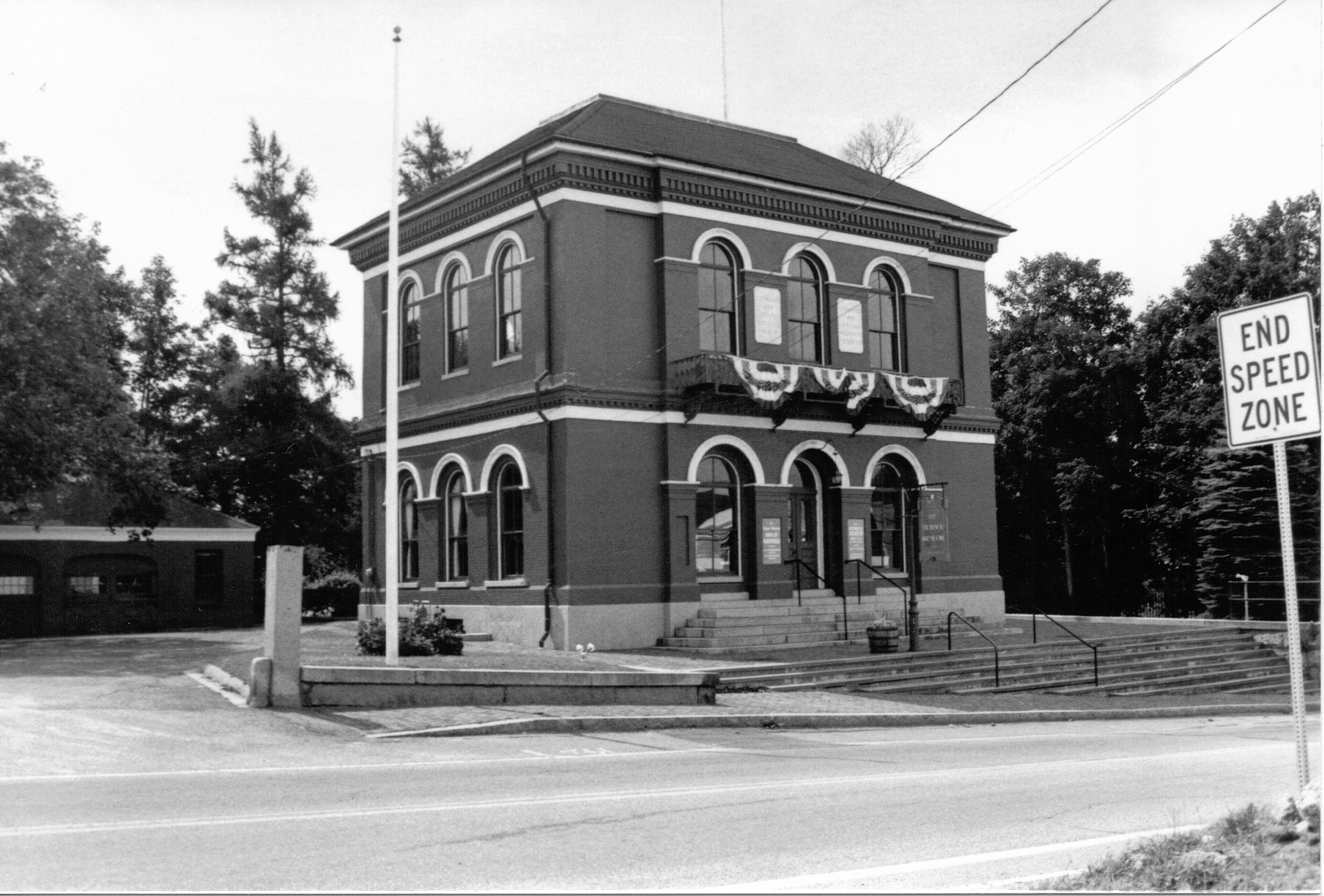
U. S. Custom House, Barnstable, Massachusetts

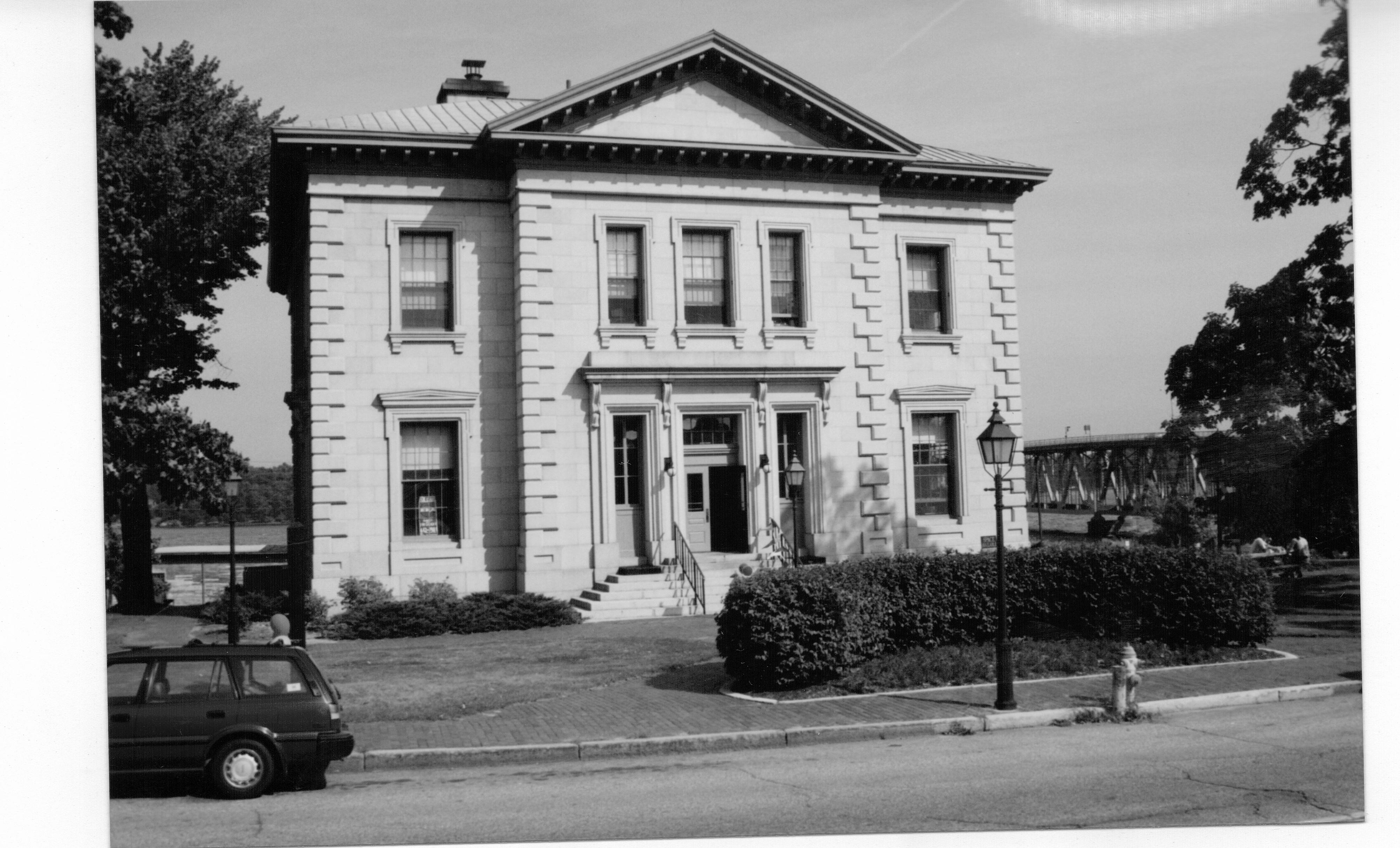
U. S. Custom House, Bath, Maine 1991

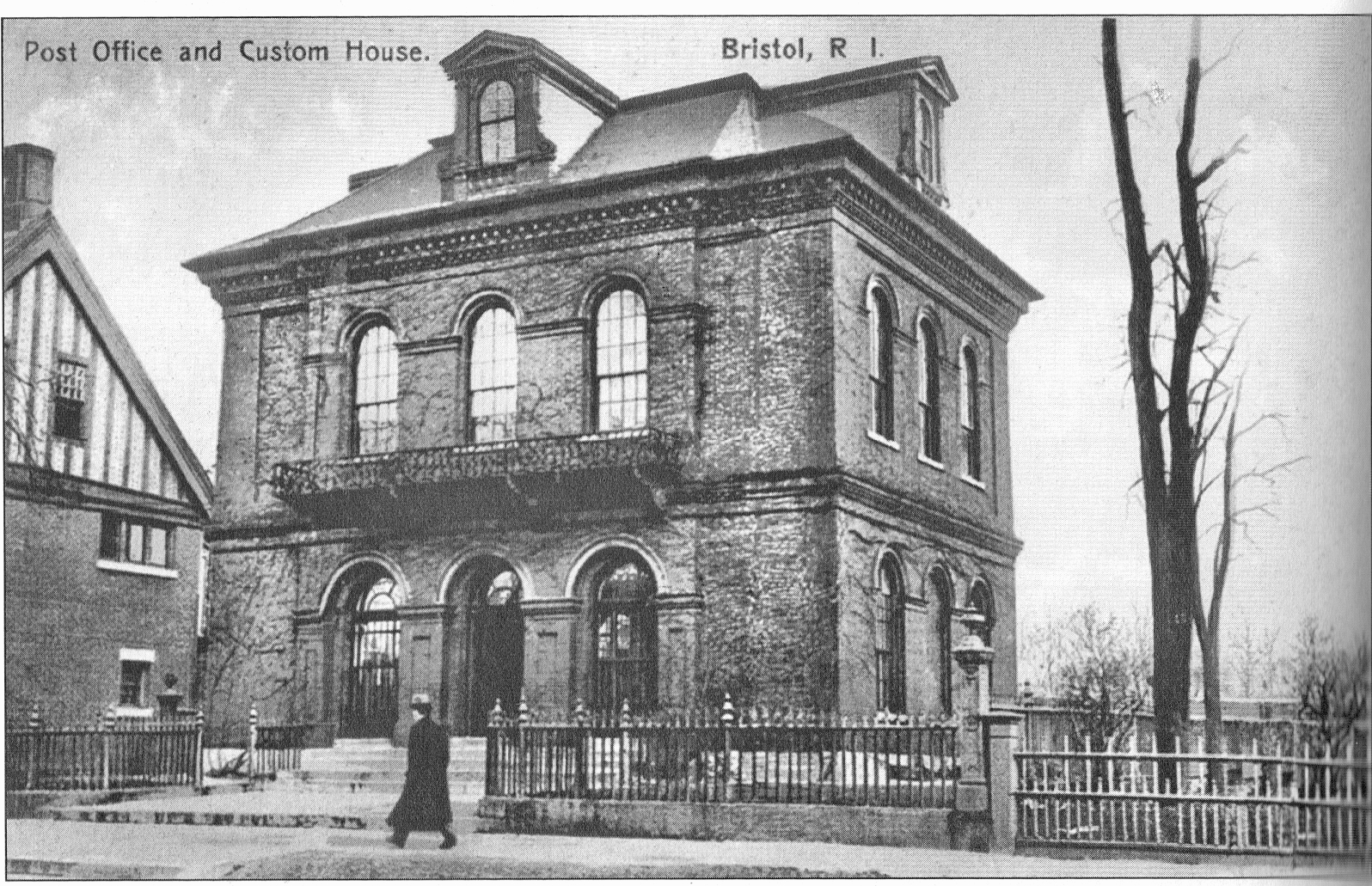
U. S. Custom House, Bristol, Rhode Island 1901

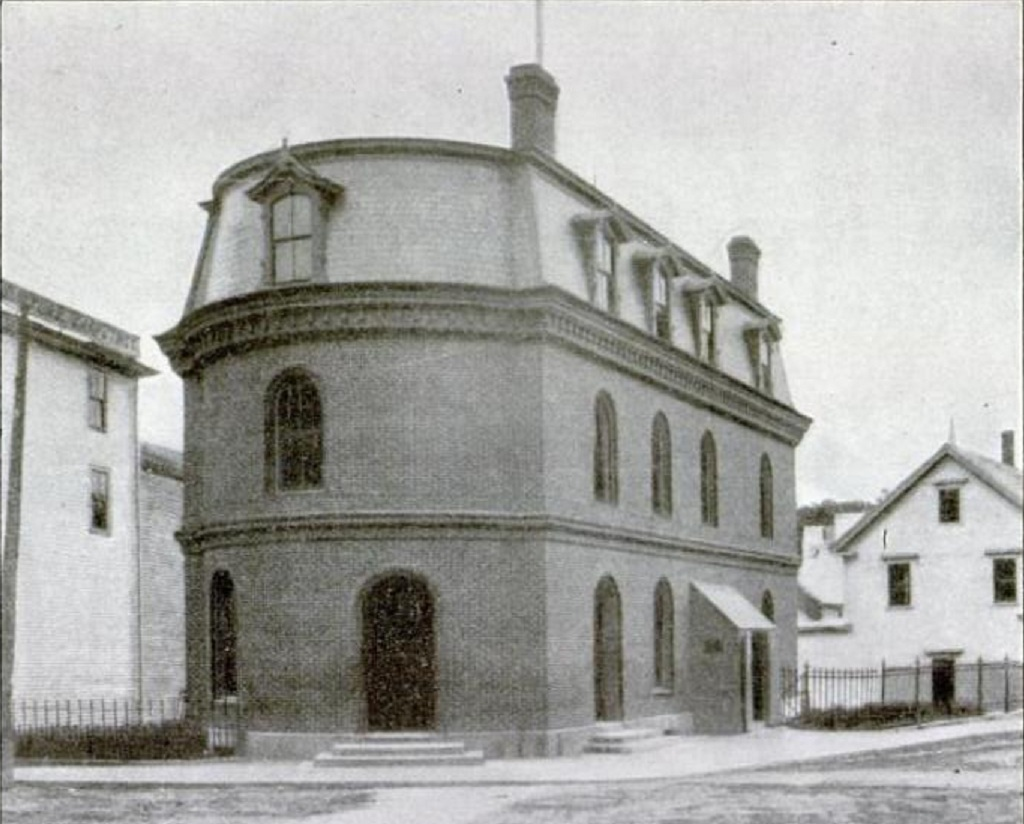
U. S. Custom House, Ellsworth, Maine 1901

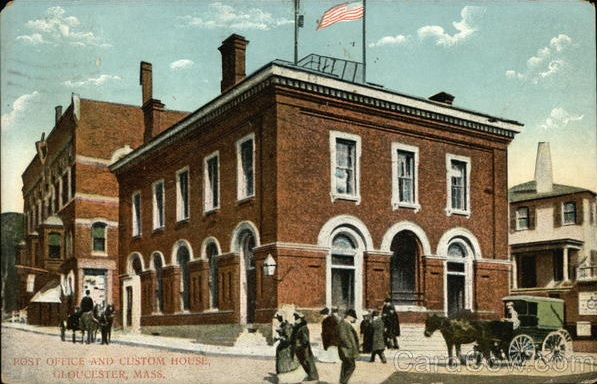
U. S. Custom House, Gloucester, Massachusetts

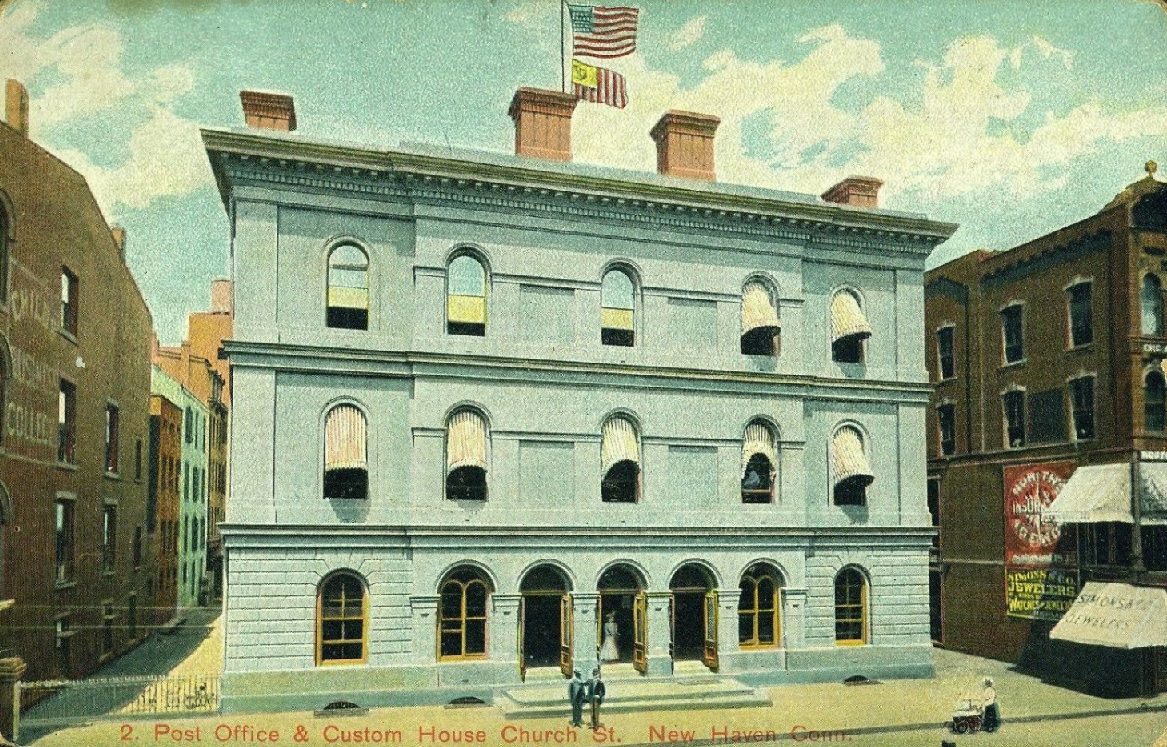
U, S. Custom House, New Haven, Connecticut, 1901

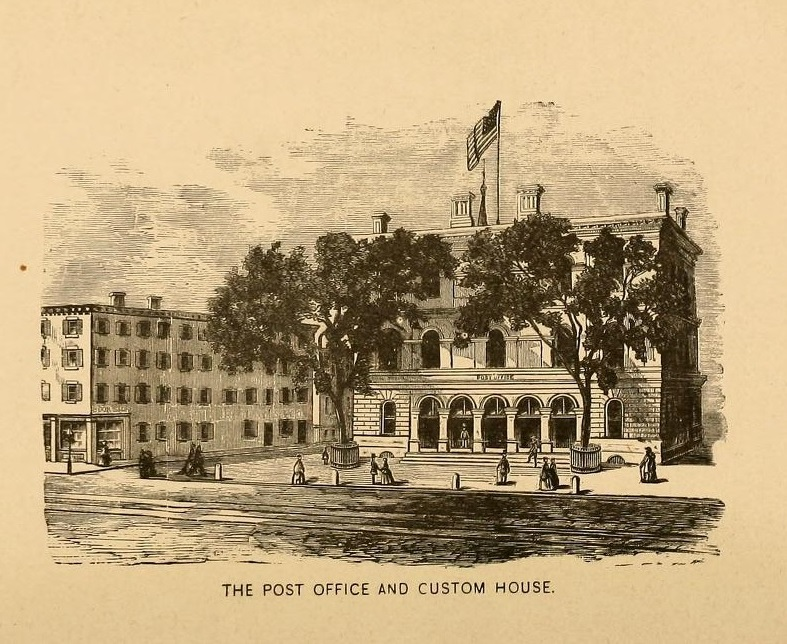
U. S. Custom House, Broad at Academy Streets, Newark, New Jersey

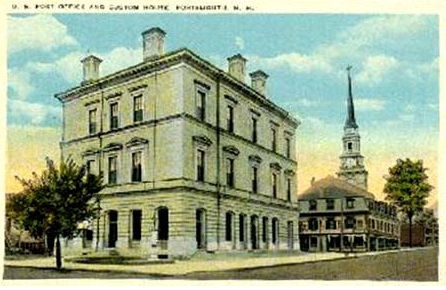
U. S. Customhouse and Post Office, Portsmouth, New Hampshire

== Notes ==
Preceded by Robert Mills, as Federal Architect	Federal Architectural Advisor; 1842–1852	Succeeded by Ammi B. Young, as Supervising Architect

Preceded by Ammi B. Young, as Federal Architectural Advisor	Office of the Supervising Architect; 1852–1862	Succeeded by Isaiah Rogers
