= George B. Shattuck =

George Brune Shattuck (August 18, 1844 – March 12, 1923) was an American medical doctor who was the editor of the Boston Medical and Surgical Journal (now known as The New England Journal of Medicine) for 31 years.

== Early life ==
Shattuck was born on August 18, 1844, in Boston. His parents were George Cheyne Shattuck Jr. and Anne Henrietta (Brune) Shattuck. George Cheyne Shattuck Jr. was the dean of the Harvard Medical School from 1864 to 1869 and the son of physician George Cheyne Shattuck Sr. Shattuck graduated from St. Paul's School, which his father founded. He attended the College of St. James in Hagerstown, Maryland for his freshman and sophomore years, then transferred to Harvard College.

== Career ==
Shattuck graduated from Harvard in 1863 and pursued a postgraduate education in medicine. He was a house pupil at Massachusetts General Hospital and earned his Doctor of Medicine from Harvard Medical School in 1869. He worked as a physician at Boston City Hospital, Carney Hospital, and the Boston Dispensary . In 1882, he was the acting health officer for the Massachusetts board of health, lunacy, and charity. From 1896 to 1898, he was an instructor in clinical medicine at the Harvard Medical School. He was a member of the Harvard Board of Overseers from 1890 to 1891 and again from 1903 to 1912. He was elected president of the board of managers of the Massachusetts Charitable Eye and Ear Infirmary on October 30, 1902. He resigned in 1918 was succeeded by the former dean of the Harvard Medical School, Edward Hickling Bradford. Shattuck was vice president of the Boston Medical Library Association from 1904 to 1906 and its president from 1906 to 1919. From 1910 to 1912, he was president of the Massachusetts Medical Society. He gave up the practice of medicine in 1911.

Shattuck joined the staff of the Boston Medical and Surgical Journal under the editorship of John Collins Warren. He was an assistant editor when the periodical published an editorial criticizing the method of appointing coroners, which led to a lawsuit that was decided in favor of The Journal and led to the abolishment of the coroner system. He was editor of The Journal from 1881 until his retirement in 1912. In 1928, The Journal renamed to The New England Journal of Medicine.

== Personal life and death ==
On June 6, 1872, he married Amalia Schutte de Lavalle of Paris. They had two daughters – Corina and Eleanor. Shattuck was a member of the Somerset Club, The Country Club, and the Harvard Clubs of Boston and New York City. He was a founder of the Church of the Advent.

Shattuck died from "intercurrent bronchitis" on March 12, 1923, at his home in Boston. The funeral was held at the chapel at Mount Auburn Cemetery.
