= Alfred Worcester =

American medical doctor

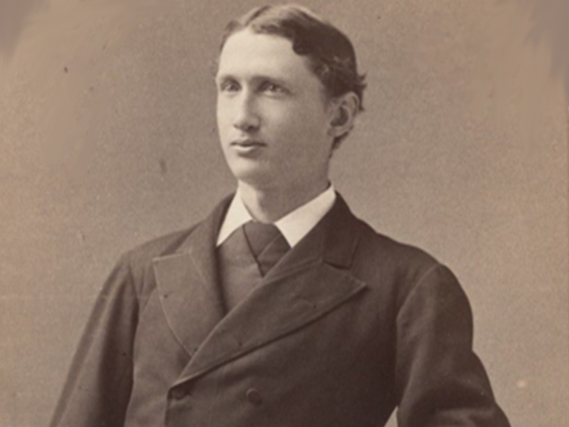
Alfred Worcester c. 1878

Alfred Worcester (1855–1951) was a general practitioner in Waltham, Massachusetts. He is known for pioneering work in patient care, the treatment of appendicitis, and the use of the Caesarean section.

== Biography ==
Alfred Worcester was born in Waltham, Massachusetts on June 22, 1855. He earned his Bachelor's degree (A.B.) at Harvard College in 1878 and was a member of Phi Beta Kappa. He received his M.D. at Harvard Medical School in 1883. He entered practice in Waltham in 1884 and founded the Waltham Hospital and Training School for Nurses the following year. He married Elizabeth Joy Hill (1854–1951), the daughter of Thomas Hill, former president of Harvard College, Worcester died August 28, 1951. His wife died six days later at their home in Waltham.

== Accomplishments ==
Worcester is considered a pioneer in the organization, practice, training, and science of medical and nursing care. He began the practice of focusing on the care of the patient, which would be applicable to all medical specialties. He was an early adopter of appendectomy for appendicitis and of Caesarean section for complicated labor. He advocated for compassionate medical care and counseling for college students and was Harvard College's second Professor of Hygiene. He suffered several life-threatening illnesses, including appendicitis, which informed his approach to patient care. He was also a prolific writer and speaker and was deeply religious. He gave lectures and sermons across the United States and Canada.

Worcester also founded the Rutland Sanatorium (for care of tuberculosis) in 1895; admonished the physicians of eastern Canada to allow the founding of the Victorian Order of Nurses in 1897; became the president of the Obstetrical Society of Boston in 1899; founded Waltham Baby Hospital in 1902; was a Major in the American Red Cross in Switzerland, 1918–1919; was the president of the Massachusetts Medical Society 1919–1921; was a professor of hygiene at Harvard College, 1925–1935.

Because of his innovations, he was often involved in controversy. Scientific medicine was on the rise while he advocated preserving humanistic medicine. Including practical experience in home care in nurses' training, which he organized at the Waltham Training School for Nurses, was frowned upon by hospital-based nursing school administrators of the day.

=== Appendectomy ===
In the 1880s, appendicitis was treated expectantly, by waiting for a walled-off abscess to form, with incision and drainage via anterior or posterior approach. This treatment was often fatal. Worcester improved on this by operating earlier in the course of the disease, entering the peritoneum to do so. At first, this was by open lavage of the peritoneal cavity and removal of what was left of the ruptured appendix. Later, he found that he could operate before the appendix had ruptured and prevent generalized peritonitis and abscess formation, which greatly reduced morbidity and mortality. The reports of his cases and the disagreement between him and the other surgeons of Boston demonstrate the evolution of medical and surgical practice and the contribution of generalists to specialty care.

=== Geriatrics, palliative care, and patient care ===
Dr. Francis Peabody's noted statement, "the secret of the care of the patient is in caring for the patient," was delivered in a series of lectures initiated by Worcester. Some of the lectures, including Worcester's on the care of the aged and the care of the dying, were published in a collection in 1929. Worcester's lectures were then published on their own in 1935, together with a third lecture on the care of the dead. This book received a second edition and several printings, the last being in 1977. Dame Cicely Saunders, the leader of the palliative care movement in the United Kingdom, was inspired by Worcester's book during her training. In this book, Worcester states:

The relief and comfort of our aged patients should be our aim, rather than the prolongation of their lives. But this is hardly a true distinction, for the relief and comfort given to an aged patient often effect the prolongation of life if only by restoring the willingness to live.

— Alfred Worcester

… discomfort and suffering are only too possible in the earlier stages of dying. Much of this is avoidable. Some of it, as we have seen, is due to lack of proper treatment or to wrong treatment of the patient. In the latter case the harm is generally from failing to recognize that the treatment needed is radically different from what is appropriate when restoration is possible… It may be easier in such a case ... for the physician, against his own judgment of what is best for the patient, to surrender to the prejudices or desires of agonized relatives who do not understand and so cannot accept the facts. All of the physician's patience, tact and sympathy are then needed, and, above all, his firmness. If he is unremitting in his attention to the patient he will eventually win the confidence and gratitude of the family; and meanwhile, what is of far more worth, he will have the satisfaction of knowing that he is doing as he would be done by.

— Alfred Worcester

Worcester's consult on a case in a memoir of turn-of-the-century Malden, Massachusetts, includes this observation:

Dr. Worcester said, and I have also noticed, that when one member of a family is cracked, some other member is the one who breaks down…

— Elliot Paul
