= United States Customhouse and Post Office (Bath, Maine) =

- U.S. Customhouse and Post Office
- U.S. National Register of Historic Places
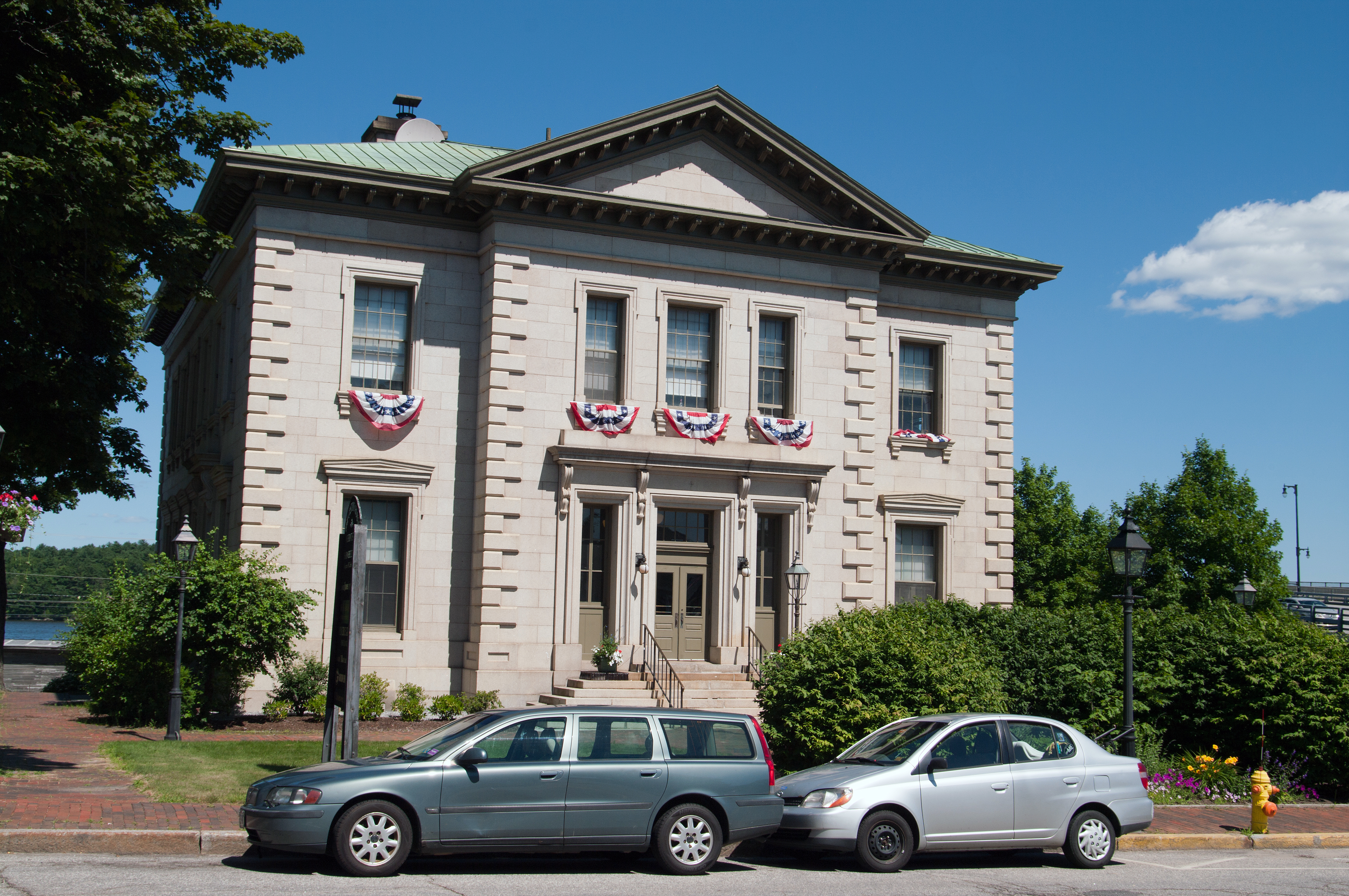

- Location within Maine Location within the United States
- Location: 25 Front St., Bath, Maine
- Coordinates: 43°54′43″N 69°48′56″W
- Area: 1 acre (0.40 ha)
- Built: 1858
- Architect: Ammi B. Young
- Architectural style: Renaissance, Italian Renaissance Revival
- NRHP reference No.: 70000064
- Added to NRHP: October 6, 1970

The U.S. Customhouse and Post Office is a historic commercial building at 1 Front Street in downtown Bath, Maine. Built by the federal government in 1858, it is a fine example of Italianate architecture designed by Ammi B. Young, housing the local post office and customs facilities until 1970. The building was listed on the National Register of Historic Places in 1970. It now houses businesses.

== Description and history ==
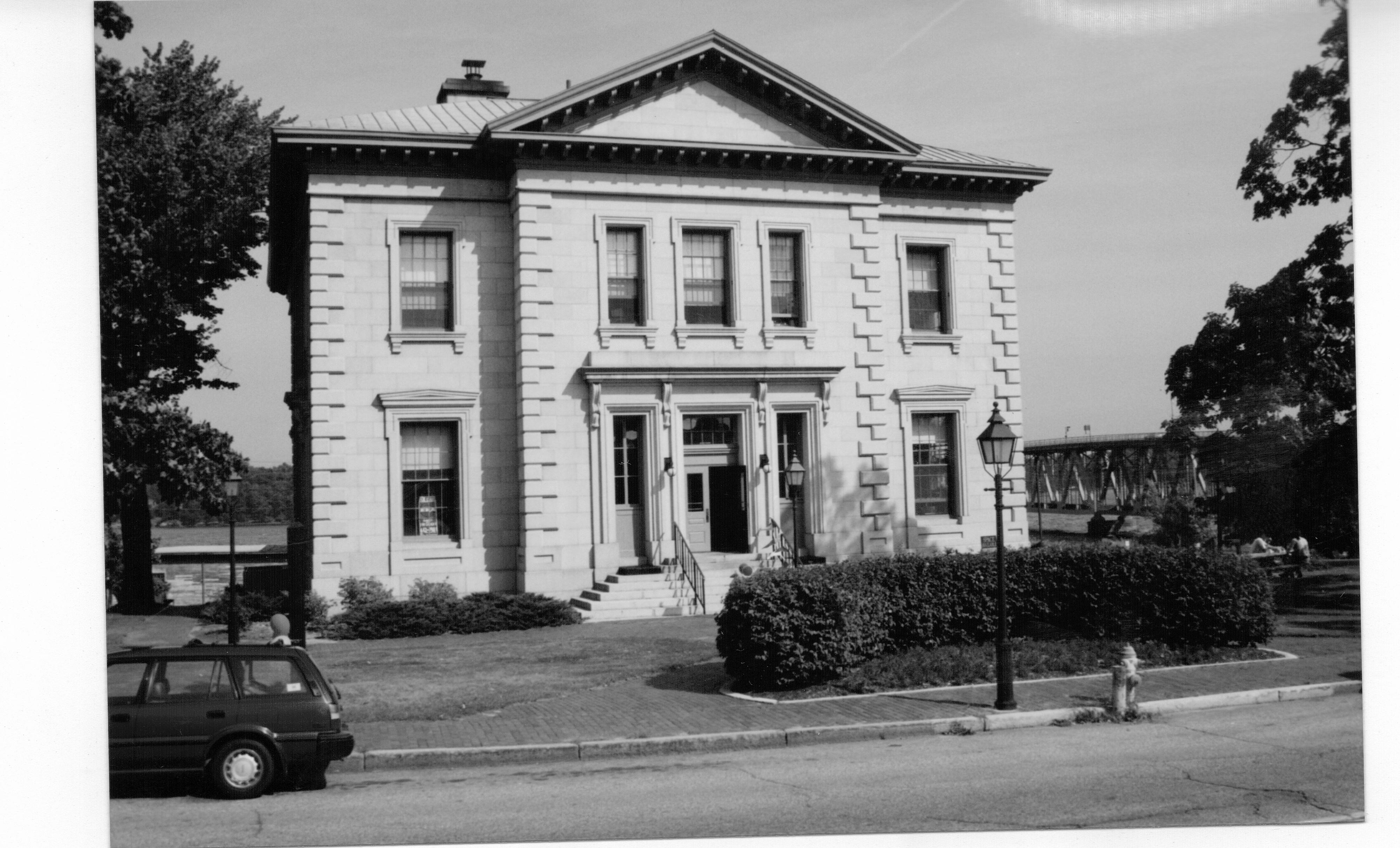
U. S. Custom House, Bath, Maine 1991

The former United States Customhouse and Post Office stands at the southern end of Front Street, on a lot also bounded by Lambard and Commercial Streets, and by United States Route 1 on the south. It is a two-story masonry structure, built out of ashlar granite and covered by a truncated metal hip roof. Its front facade (facing west) has a center projecting section topped by a fully pedimented low-pitch gable. The gable and the main roof line eaves are studded with modillions, and the building corners are quoined. Windows on the ground floor are set in rectangular openings with low gabled hoods, while those on the second floor have hoods with drip moulding. The entrance is an elaborate three-section arrangement topped by a bracketed cornice. The interior construction includes iron beams supported either by stone or iron posts, an advance in fire-resistant building materials of the period.

The customhouse was built in 1858 to serve the needs of Bath's burgeoning port, which was a major shipping and shipbuilding center on Maine's Mid Coast. It was designed by Ammi B. Young, who had become head of the Office of the Supervising Architect of the United States Treasury Department in 1852. Young was responsible for the design of many government buildings, including notable works such as the Vermont State Capitol and the Boston Custom House. It served as the local post office and customhouse until 1970, when it was declared surplus by the General Services Administration. The building now houses a variety of businesses.

== See also ==
- National Register of Historic Places listings in Sagadahoc County, Maine
- List of United States post offices
