= George Cheyne Shattuck Jr. =

American physician (1813–1893)

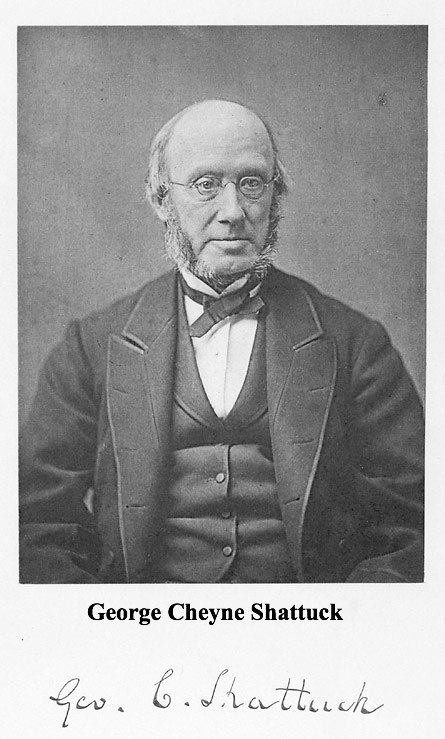
- Born: George Cheyne Shattuck; July 22, 1813; Boston, Massachusetts, U.S.
- Died: May 22, 1893 (aged 79); Boston, Massachusetts, U.S.
- Education: Harvard College; Harvard Medical School
- Occupation: Dean of the Harvard Medical School
- Known for: Founding of St. Paul's School
- Spouse: Anne Henrietta Brune (m. 1840)
- Children: 3, including George

George Cheyne Shattuck Jr. (July 22, 1813 – March 22, 1893) was an American medical doctor and educator who was the founder of St. Paul's School in Concord, New Hampshire, and the dean of the Harvard Medical School from 1864 to 1869.

== Early life ==
Shattuck was born in Boston on July 22, 1813, to George C. and Eliza Cheever (Davis) Shattuck. His maternal grandfather was Caleb Davis. He prepared for college at Joseph Cogswell's Round Hill School. He graduated from Harvard College in 1831. After one year at Harvard Law School, he entered Harvard Medical School. He graduated in 1835 and continued his studies in Europe.

== Career ==
Upon returning to Boston, Shattuck practiced with his father, who was one of the city's leading physicians. From 1849 to 1885, he was a visiting physician at Massachusetts General Hospital. He was a professor of clinical medicine at the Harvard Medical School from 1855 to 1859. He then served as a professor of the theory and practice of medicine at the school until 1873. From 1864 to 1869, he was also the dean of the faculty of medicine. From 1872 to 1874, he was the president of the Massachusetts Medical Society. In 1877, he was elected a fellow of the American Academy of Arts and Sciences.

== St. Paul's School ==
In 1856, Shattuck converted his summer home in Concord into a boarding school for boys. Inspired by the educational theories of Johann Heinrich Pestalozzi, who believed that classroom learning should be balanced with the "direct experience of the senses", Shattuck wanted his two sons educated in the austere, bucolic countryside. He hoped that eventually the school would "educate the sons of [other] wealthy inhabitants of large cities."

== Personal life and death ==
On April 9, 1840, Shattuck married Anne Henrietta Brune of Baltimore, who was the sister of one of his Harvard classmates. After his marriage, Shattuck abandoned Unitarianism and became an active member of the Episcopal Church. He was a generous donor to the Church of the Advent. In 1866, he funded the construction of a new building for an Episcopal-affiliated boarding school in Minnesota. The school eventually became known as the Shattuck School and later merged with two other schools to become Shattuck-Saint Mary's School. Shattuck was also a trustee of the General Theological Seminary.

Shattuck died on March 22, 1893, after a lengthy illness. He was survived by his wife, a daughter, and two sons. Both of his sons, George B. Shattuck and Frederick Cheever Shattuck, were doctors and professors of clinical medicine at Harvard.
