= Walter Prentice Bowers =

American physician and editor (1855 – 1947)

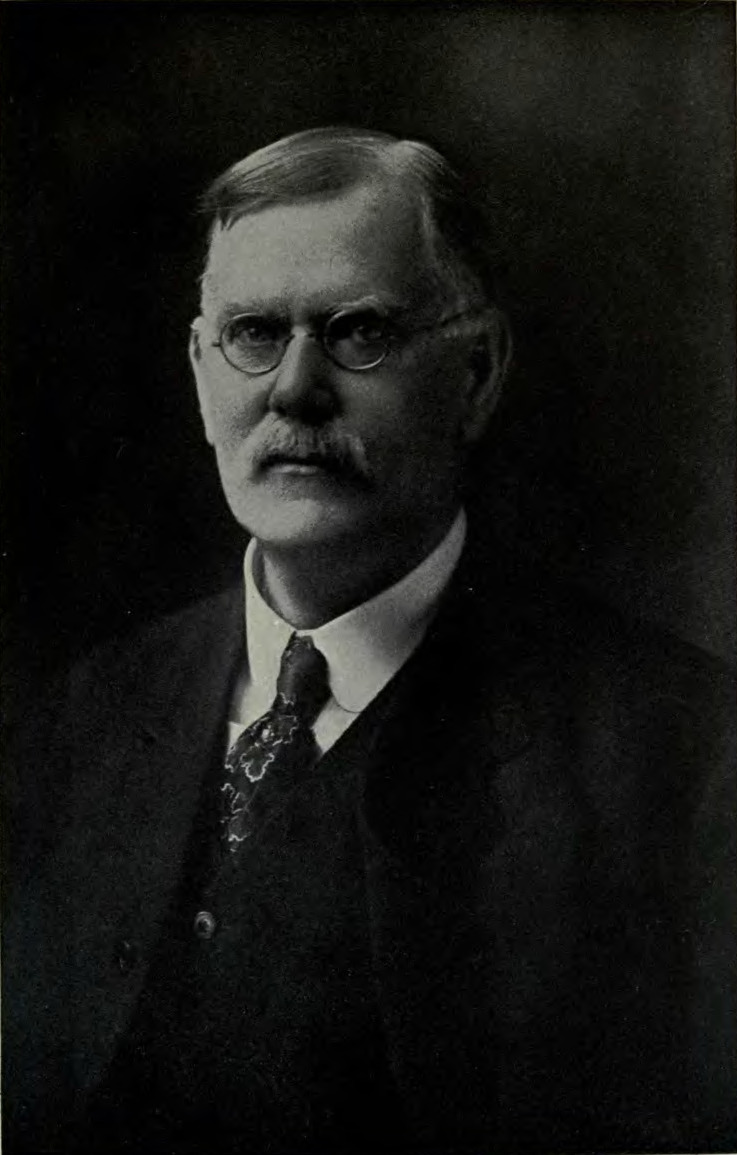
- Walter Prentice Bowers
- Born: May 19, 1855; Clinton, Massachusetts
- Died: July 22, 1947 (aged 92)
- Education: Harvard Medical School
- Occupations: General practitioner and the first editor of The New England Journal of Medicine

Walter Prentice Bowers (May 19, 1855 – July 22, 1947) was an American general practitioner and the first editor of The New England Journal of Medicine. Born in Clinton, Massachusetts, he worked as a general practitioner in Worcester County for over four decades. He was president of the Massachusetts Medical Society from 1912 to 1914 and was managing editor of the society's journal, The New England Journal of Medicine, from 1921 until 1937. He was conferred an honorary Master of Arts by Harvard University in 1935.
