= Shattuck Observatory =

Observatory in New Hampshire, US

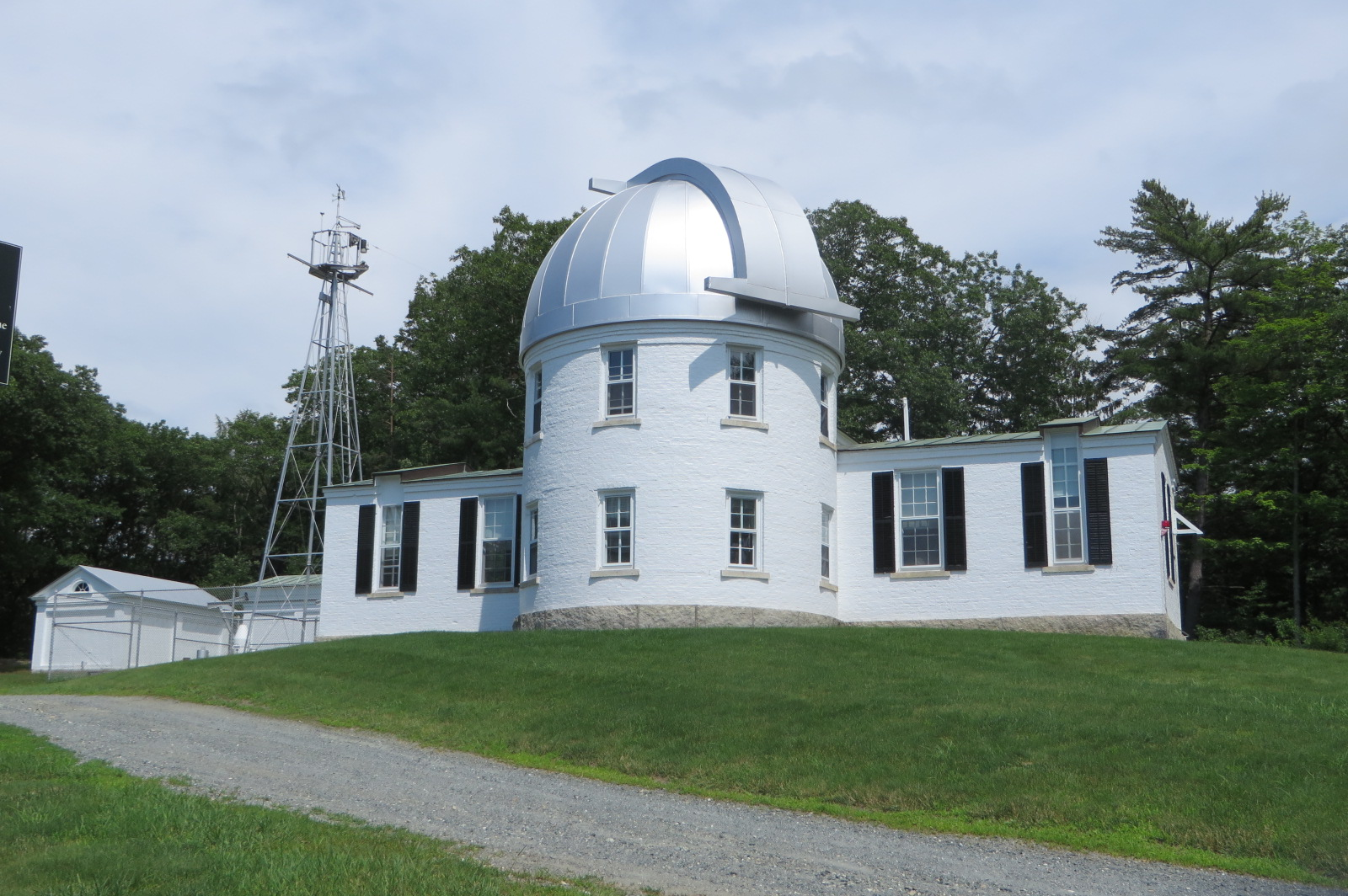
- Shattuck Observatory in 2017
- Organization: Dartmouth College
- Observatory code: 307
- Location: Hanover, New Hampshire
- Coordinates: 43°42′18″N 72°17′07″W
- Established: 1854
- Website: www.dartmouth.edu/~physics/news/observing.html

Telescopes
- unnamed telescope: 9.5-inch refractor
- Related media on Commons

Shattuck Observatory is an astronomical observatory owned and operated by Dartmouth College in Hanover, New Hampshire, United States.

The observatory's most notable director was Edwin Brant Frost, who went on to be the director of the Yerkes Observatory. Today, it is primarily used for instructional purposes, but is open for public observation of the stars on Friday evenings. For scientific work Dartmouth has shares in the MDM Observatory on Kitt Peak, Arizona, and the Southern African Large Telescope in South Africa.

== Building ==
The observatory was built in 1854 for Ira Young, Professor of Natural Philosophy, to designs drawn up by his brother Ammi B. Young, and Boston architect G.J.F. Bryant, Young was then the supervising architect of the United States Treasury Department. It is a small building with three wings and a two-story dome (20 foot diameter). Its foundations are granite blocks; the building itself is brick. It is notable as the oldest scientific building on campus. Its construction and equipment costs were covered by a gift of $7,000 by Dr. George Cheyne Shattuck Sr., Dartmouth class of 1803, who stipulated that the Trustees match the gift with an additional $4,000. In 1955 the building was renovated and its original dome replaced, but otherwise the building remains substantially unaltered since its first construction.

== Telescopes ==
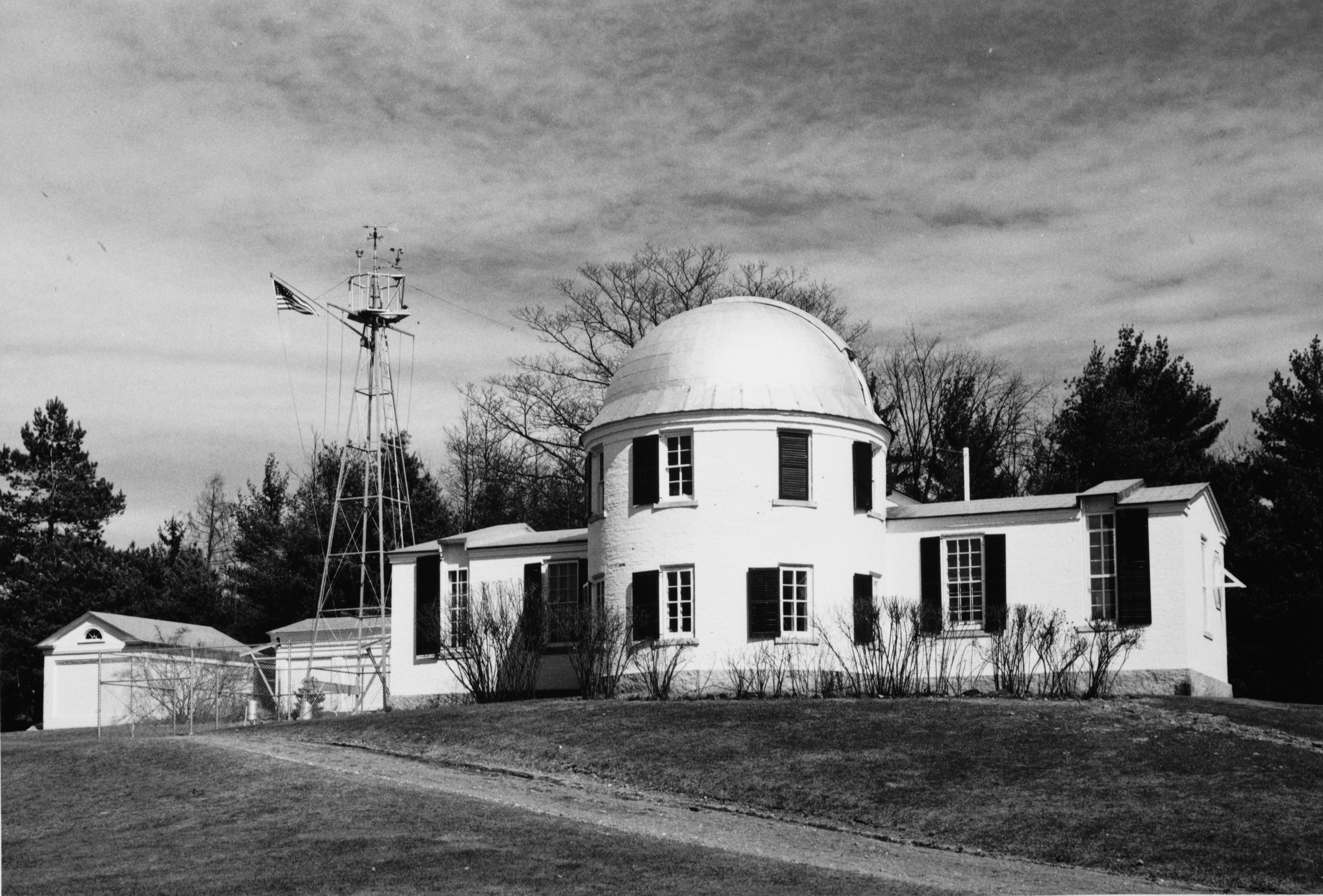
Shattuck Observatory around 1950, with original dome. The college's weather station can be seen to the left of the building.

- 9.5-inch (24 cm) refracting telescope built in 1872
- 4-inch Troughton & Simms meridian circle
- 12-inch Meade LX200

== See also ==
- List of astronomical observatories
