= United States Customhouse (Oswego, New York) =

- U.S. Customhouse
- U.S. National Register of Historic Places
- Location within New York Location within the United States
- Location: W. Oneida St. between 1st and 2nd Sts., Oswego, New York
- Coordinates: 43°27′17″N 76°30′40″W
- Area: less than one acre
- Built: 1858
- Architect: Young, Ammi B.
- NRHP reference No.: 76001262
- Added to NRHP: November 21, 1976

U.S. Customhouse is a historic customhouse located at Oswego in Oswego County, New York. It is a three-story, flat roofed, rectangular stone building flanked by identical two-story wings. The original structure was built in 1858 and the wings added in 1935. It was designed by architect Ammi B. Young (1798–1874).

It was listed on the National Register of Historic Places in 1976.
