= Leonard Morse =

American academic (1929–2025)

Commissioner of Public Health, Worcester, Massachusetts
- In office 2002 – January 2011

Personal details
- Born: 1929 Worcester, Massachusetts, U.S.
- Died: December 12, 2025 (aged 96)

Leonard Jack Morse (1929 – December 12, 2025) was an American academic who was a professor of clinical medicine at University of Massachusetts Medical School, and a commissioner of public health for the city of Worcester. After the September 11 attacks in 2001, Morse came back from retirement to work on the town's bioterrorism plan at the request of the then-city manager. He also served as a president of the Worcester District Medical Society and the Massachusetts Medical Society in the past. He once served as chief of staff at St. Vincent Hospital, Worcester.

Morse stepped into national fame for investigation of a 1969 outbreak of hepatitis A among the College of the Holy Cross football team members that forced the season closure after the team played just two games.

== Early life ==
Morse received his high school education in Worcester, Massachusetts, at Athol High School. He was later accepted at the University of Maryland School of Medicine, from which he graduated in 1955. Morse did his residency at Saint Vincent Hospital in Worcester, where he remained as faculty.

== Professional life ==
Morse specialized in infectious diseases and worked as a consultant for the Worcester Department of Public Health. He also had a private practice and worked at St. Vincent Hospital. Morse was outspoken about a variety of issues in medical practice and always rallied support for what he thought was in the best interests of public health. In the 1950s when smoking was still considered to be not dangerous, Morse's fight led the Worcester District Medical Society to print hundreds of matchbooks with the phrase "the trouble with smoking is starting." He is also remembered for resigning as the chairman of the state board of medical registration in protest against what he saw as unfair Medicare reimbursement practices.

== Tenure as Public Health commissioner ==
As Public Health commissioner, Morse is known for many health initiatives, some relating directly to personal health and others primarily dealing with the public's health. As a career infectious disease specialist, Morse was interested in the impact of Canada geese on Elm Park, a city park of Worcester. Persistent efforts from him and James Gardiner, the previous commissioner of health and human services, resulted in maintaining the geese numbers in Worcester at acceptable levels.

== Yellow box program ==
Morse beside a Yellow Box at Senior Center, Worcester

Probably the most controversial decision taken by Morse is the yellow box program, which provides safe receptacles for used syringes and needles. This decision was described by William T. Breault, founder and head of the Main South Alliance for Public Safety, as a rogue decision taken in the wrong direction. Morse intended this program to be a common use for drug addicts and diabetics and floated the idea in 2005. This met with stiff opposition from people who felt that the program was enabling towards drug users. Opponents were also angry that community discussion was not undertaken when deciding the project.

A city council meeting in 2006 ended up with strong voices both for and against the program. It was not until late 2007 that a yellow box was installed in the city of Worcester. This followed state legislation making over-the-counter sales of syringes and needles legal. The city council, at a meeting held six months before the first box's installation, voted unanimously to approve three more. Presently there are plans under consideration to install four more boxes, bringing the total to eight.

Morse retired as the commissioner of public health in early 2011. The incoming commissioner, Dale Magee, took over the duties in January 2011, and in an interview with Worcester Mag he referred to Morse as a tough man to replace.

== Death ==
Morse died on December 12, 2025, at the age of 96.
