= United States Marine Hospital (Portland, Maine) =

- Marine Hospital
- U.S. National Register of Historic Places
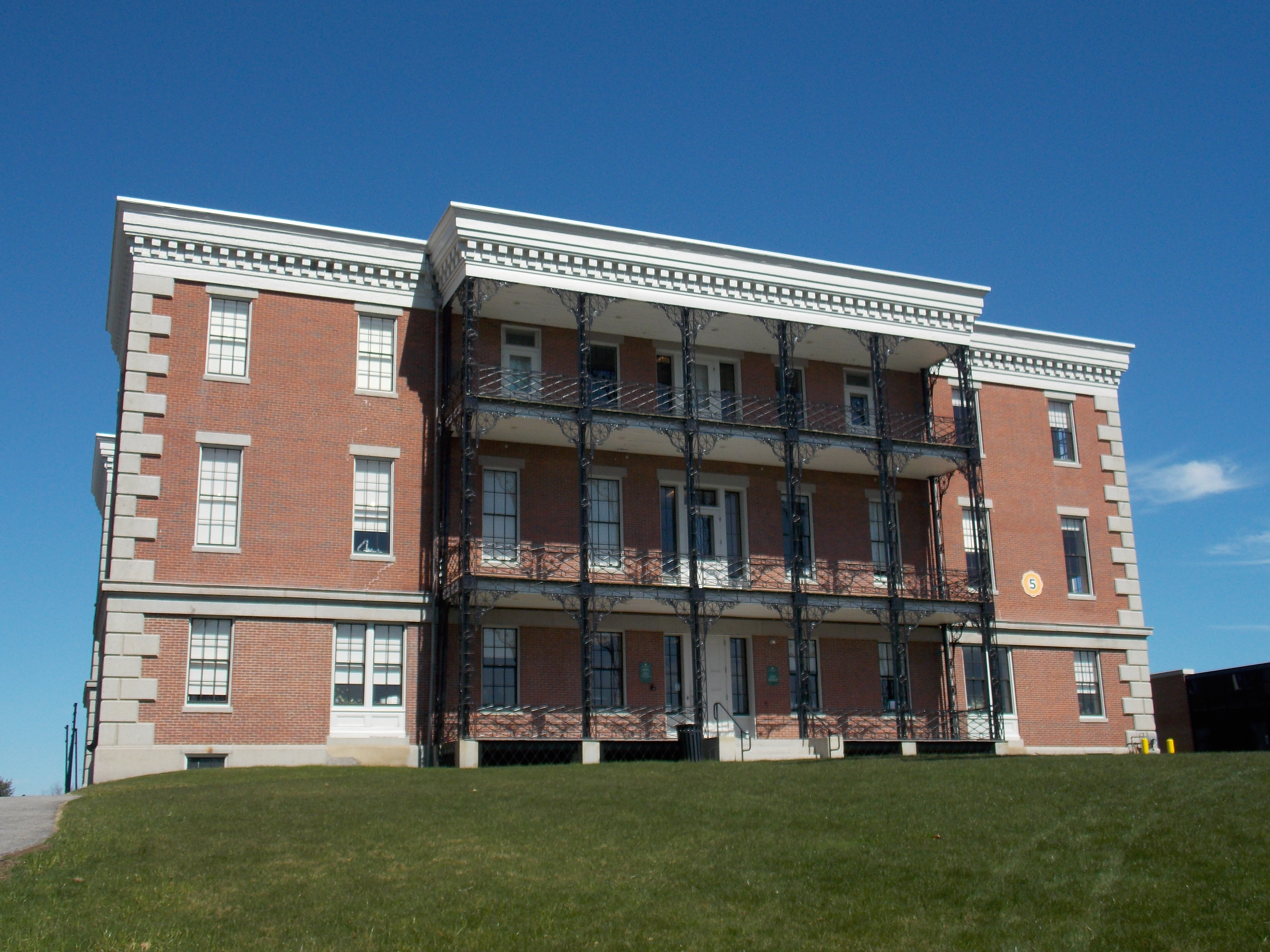

- Location within Maine Location within the United States
- Location: 331 Veranda St. Portland, Maine, U.S.
- Coordinates: 43°41′18″N 70°14′51″W
- Area: 1 acre (0.40 ha)
- Built: 1855
- Architect: Ammi B. Young
- Architectural style: Italianate
- NRHP reference No.: 74000161
- Added to NRHP: August 21, 1974

The Marine Hospital is a historic medical facility at 331 Veranda Road in Martin's Point in Portland, Maine. Built in the late 1850s to a design by Ammi B. Young, it is the only known surviving Marine Hospital of the period to retain original iron railings. The building is now part of the Portland campus of the Martin's Point Health Care medical practice. It was listed on the National Register of Historic Places in 1974.

== Description and history ==
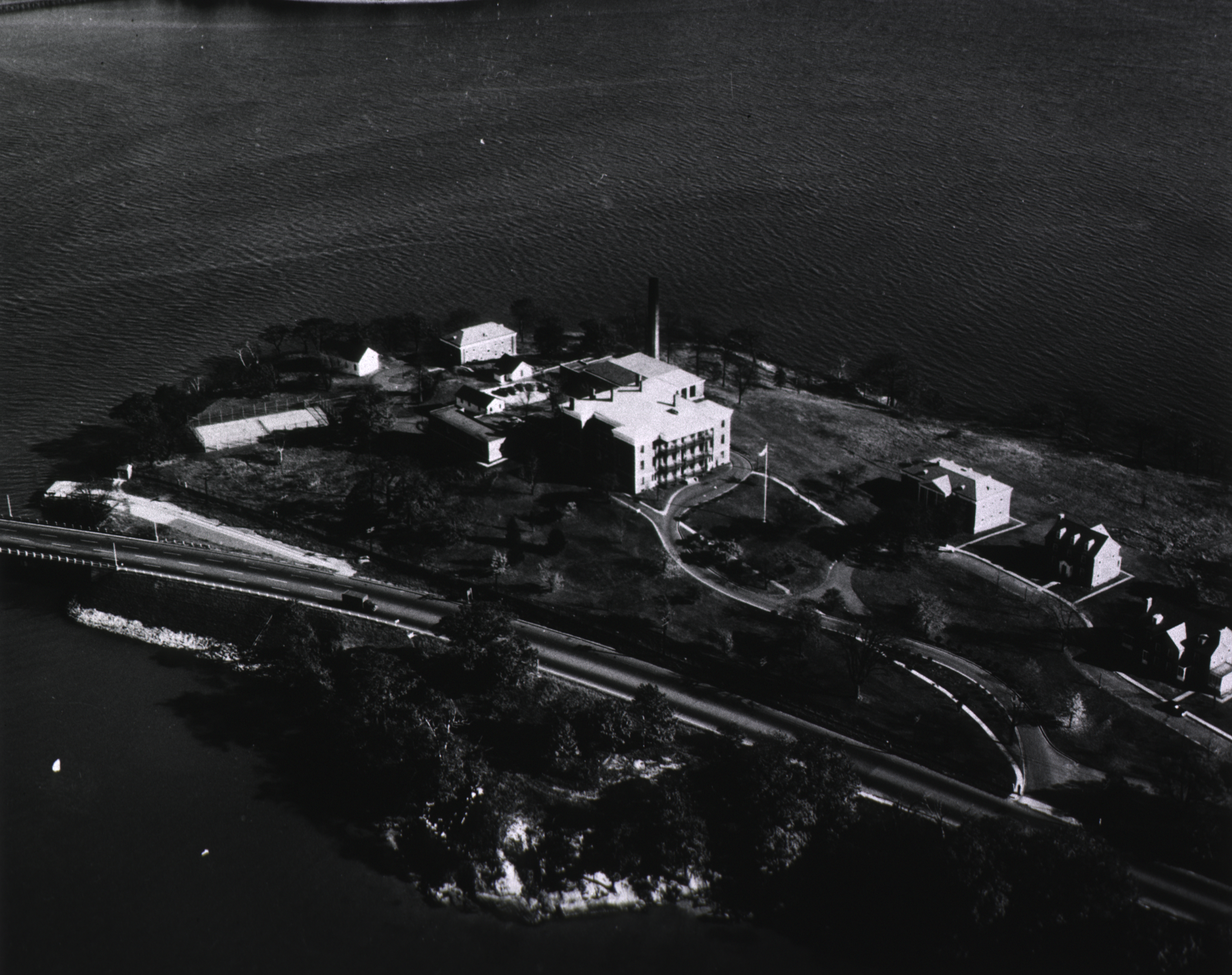
Undated aerial view of the hospital grounds

The former Marine Hospital building occupies a prominent hilltop on Martin's Point, a peninsular projection in eastern Portland that marks the southern side of the mouth of the Presumpscot River at Casco Bay. The larger and lower modern Martin's Point Health Care building stands to the southeast, with the main entrance rotary to the building's northeast. The Marine Hospital is a three-story structure, built with load-bearing brick walls and granite trim. It has a roughly H-shaped plan, with granite quoining at the corners, and a multi-stage projecting cornice that includes a band of bracketing. Windows are typically sash, set in rectangular openings with granite lintels and sills. The southwest facade is nine bays wide, with the central five bays taken up by a stack of balconies, which have cast iron railings that are original to the building's construction. The porches are topped by a projecting roof section that continues the elaborate cornice.

The hospital was built in 1855-59 by the federal government, as part of the Marine Hospital Service, which provided medical care to sick and disabled seamen. The building was designed by Ammi B. Young, then the supervising architect of the United States Treasury Department. Young was responsible for designing a significant number of federal buildings in this role, including several marine hospitals; this building is the only one of those buildings to survive with its ironwork (one of Young's signature features) relatively intact.

The Marine Hospital Service was created by Congress in 1798, and there was an active service in Portland, Maine's largest port, by 1805. This hospital was built on the site of the Veranda Hotel, which burned in 1847. It served as a hospital until 1952, and in 1956 it became a Marine Corps Reserve Training Center. Before becoming part of Martin's Point Health Care, it was also used as an outpatient clinic of the United States Public Health Service.

== See also ==
- National Register of Historic Places listings in Portland, Maine
