= Lydia Villa-Komaroff =

Mexican American cellular biologist

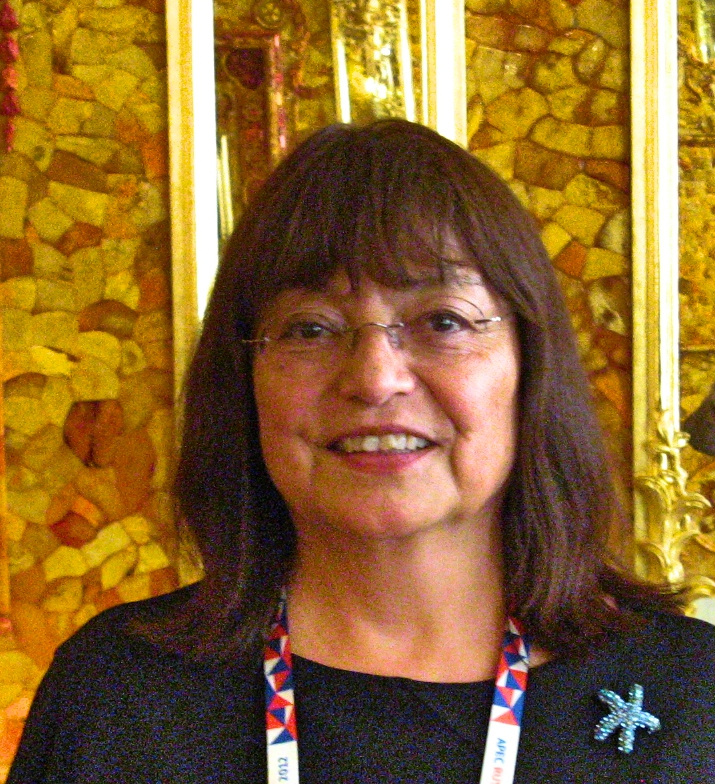
- Lydia Villa-Komaroff in 2013
- Born: August 7, 1947 (age 79)
- Citizenship: American
- Education: Goucher College (BA); Massachusetts Institute of Technology (PhD)
- Spouse: Anthony L. Komaroff
- Awards: 2013 Woman of Distinction by the American Association of University Women
- Scientific career
- Fields: Molecular Biology
- Workplaces: MIT, Harvard University, Northwestern University
- Doctoral advisor: Harvey Lodish, David Baltimore
- Other academic advisors: Fotis Kafatos, Tom Maniatis, Walter Gilbert

Lydia Villa-Komaroff (born August 7, 1947) is a molecular and cellular biologist who has been an academic laboratory scientist, a university administrator, and a business woman. She was the third Mexican-American woman in the United States to receive a doctorate degree in the sciences (1975) and is a co-founding member of The Society for the Advancement of Chicanos/Hispanics and Native Americans in Science (SACNAS). Her most notable discovery was in 1978 during her post-doctoral research, when she was part of a team that discovered how bacterial cells could be used to generate insulin.

== Early life & family ==
Lydia Villa-Komaroff (As Told By Jo Handelsman)

Lydia Villa-Komaroff was born on August 7, 1947, and grew up in Santa Fe, New Mexico. She was the eldest of six children; her father, John, was a teacher and musician and her mother, Drucilla, was a social worker. By the age of nine, Villa-Komaroff knew that she wanted to be a scientist, influenced in part by her uncle, a chemist. She was also inspired due to her mother's and grandmother's love for both nature and plants.

== Education & career ==
In 1965, she entered the University of Washington in Seattle as a chemistry major. When an advisor told her that "women do not belong in chemistry" she switched majors, settling on biology. In 1967, she transferred to Goucher College in Maryland, when her boyfriend moved to the Washington, D.C. metropolitan area to work at the National Institutes of Health. It is believed that she applied to Johns Hopkins University, but was not accepted because they were not accepting women at that time. In 1970, she married her boyfriend, Dr. Anthony L. Komaroff, and the couple moved to Boston.

In 1970, Villa-Komaroff enrolled at the Massachusetts Institute of Technology (MIT) for graduate work in molecular biology. Her PhD dissertation, under the supervision of Harvey Lodish and Nobel laureate David Baltimore, focused on how proteins are produced from RNA in poliovirus. She dedicated her thesis to her colleagues David Rekosh and David Housman, who she says "taught me to walk," and her advisors who "taught me what it might be like to fly."

In 1973, while still a graduate student at MIT, she became a founding member of the Society for Advancement of Chicanos and Native Americans in Science (SACNAS).

She completed her PhD at MIT in cell biology in 1975. She then went to Harvard to conduct her postdoctoral research for three years, focusing on recombinant DNA technology, under the supervision of Fotis Kafatos and Tom Maniatis. When Cambridge banned such experiments in 1976, citing worries about public safety and the chance of unintentionally creating a new disease, Villa-Komaroff moved to Cold Spring Harbor Laboratory. While at Cold Spring Harbor, she experienced repeated failures of her experiments; however, these disappointments taught her that “most experiments fail, and that scientists must accept failure as a part of the process”.

Villa-Komaroff felt that these failures aided in her biggest victory: six months after she was able to return to Harvard (once the ban on recombinant DNA experiments was lifted in 1977), she became a postdoctoral fellow in the laboratory of Nobel laureate Walter Gilbert. Within 6 months, she was the first author of the landmark report from the Gilbert laboratory showing that bacteria could be induced to make proinsulin– the first time a mammalian hormone was synthesized by bacteria. The research was a milestone in the birth of the biotechnology industry.

Later in the same year, she joined the faculty of the University of Massachusetts Medical School (UMMS), where she was a professor for six years before being granted tenure. The following year, she left for a position at Harvard Medical School with a lighter teaching workload and more research opportunities including her research on transforming growth factor- α and epidermal growth factor during fetal and neonatal development published in 1992 and 1993. There, she continued to establish her name in molecular biology, and in 1995 a television documentary called "DNA Detective" featured her work on insulin-related growth factors. The segment ran as part of a six-part PBS series on women in science, under the umbrella title "Discovering Women."

In 1996, Villa-Komaroff left laboratory research, and was recruited to Northwestern University where she served as vice president for Research of the university. In 2003 she returned to Boston, where she became the Vice President for Research and Chief Operating Officer of Whitehead Institute in Cambridge, Massachusetts, an affiliated research institute of MIT. Since 2005, she has served as a senior executive and board member of several biotechnology companies. She also continues to serve on the boards and committees of several major public and private institutions.

== Research discoveries and accomplishments ==
After her participation in the landmark research reporting the first synthesis of mammalian insulin in bacterial cells, Villa-Komaroff used the then-new molecular biology technology of recombinant DNA to address a number of fundamental questions in different fields, in collaboration with neurologists, developmental biologists, endocrinologists, and cell biologists. Villa-Komaroff's laboratory made several important contributions following the insulin research.

The laboratory identified several proteins that help vision develop in very young animals. Other scientists had discovered that the development of normal vision in cats is delayed when cats are raised in total darkness and that the development of vision can be triggered by brief exposure to light. Villa-Komaroff's laboratory showed that exposing dark-reared cats to one hour of light caused a 2 to 3 fold transient induction of three specific proteins. This finding directly linked the expression of these genes with an environmental trigger (light) in the development of vision.

The laboratory also discovered direct evidence that the Gap-43 protein was important in the growth of the axons of nerve cells.

Finally, Villa-Komaroff contributed to the discovery that a molecule known to be associated with Alzheimer's disease (amyloid beta) causes degeneration of brain cells (neurons), work done in conjunction with a postdoctoral fellow in her laboratory, Bruce Yankner. Before this publication, it was unclear whether amyloid beta was a byproduct of neuronal degeneration or a contributor to that degeneration. This paper provided the first direct evidence that a fragment of the amyloid precursor protein could kill neurons, and helped stimulate a very large field dedicated to preventing and treating Alzheimer's disease by targeting amyloid beta.

== Awards and honors ==
- Fellow of the Association for Women in Science
- 1992 Hispanic Engineer National Achievement Award
- 1994 Participant in the 1994 Forum on Science in the National Interest - White House Office of Science and Technology Policy
- 1999 Induction into the Hispanic Engineer National Achievement Hall of Fame
- 2008 Fellow of the American Association for the Advancement of Science (AAAS)
- 2008 Catalyst Award - Science Club for Girls
- 2008 Hispanic Scientist of the Year, Museum of Science and Industry (Tampa)
- 2008 Lifetime Achievement award, Hispanic Business Media
- 1996-2011 Honorary Doctoral Degrees, Goucher College, University of Saint Thomas (Minnesota), Pine Manor College, and Regis College (Massachusetts),
- 2011 Leadership Award, Women Entrepreneurs in Science & Technology
- 2012 MAKERS selection, and video, as a prominent woman leader
- 2013 Woman of Distinction, American Association of University Women (AAUW)
- 2014 Distinguished Lecturer for the STEM Diversity Institute and the Five Colleges, Inc
- 2015 Distinguished Women Scientist, White House Office of Science and Technology Policy
- 2016 Morison Prize, MIT Program in Science, Technology & Society
- 2017 Honorary Co-Chair, March for Science
- 2017 Storied Women of M.I.T.

== Past positions ==
- Member, National Research Council (United States) Committee on Women in Science, Engineering, and Medicine (CWSEM)
- Member, National Research Council (United States) Committee on Underrepresented Groups
- Member, National Research Council (United States) Committee on the Expansion of the Science and Engineering Workforce Pipeline
- Member, National Research Council (United States) Committee on the Structure of NIH
- Member, NIH / National Institute of Neurological Disorders and Stroke Advisory Council
- Member, National Academy of Medicine (Institute of Medicine) Committee on Assessing the System for Protecting Human Research Subjects
- Member, National Science Foundation Committee on the Equal Opportunity in Science and Engineering
- Member, National Science Foundation Biology Directorate
- Founding member, 1973; Board member; Vice President, Society for the Advancement of Chicanos and Native Americans in Science (SACNAS)
- Vice President for Research, Northwestern University, 1998-2002
- Board of Directors, American Association for the Advancement of Science, 2001-2005
- Chief Operating Officer & Vice President for Research, Whitehead Institute, 2003-2005
- Chief Scientific Officer & Member of the Board, 2003-2004; Chief Executive Officer & Chair of the Board, 2005, Transkaryotic Therapies (acquired by Shire Pharmaceuticals in 2005)
- Chief Scientific Officer, 2005; Chief Executive Officer 2006-2009; Chief Scientific Officer, 2009-2014, Cytonome/ST
- Chair, Board of Trustees, Pine Manor College, 2007
- Member of the US delegation to the Asian-Pacific Economic Conference-Women and the Economy Forum, 2012
- Member of the Board, Massachusetts Life Sciences Center, 2012-2017

== Current positions ==
- Member of the Board, Chair of the Executive Committee, ATCC (company)
- Member of the Board of Trustees, Keck Graduate Institute of the Claremont Colleges Consortium
- Vice President, Biomedical Science Careers Program
