= Henry Coit Perkins =

American photographer, doctor (1804–1873)

Henry Coit Perkins (November 13, 1804 – February 1, 1873) was a medical doctor and a pioneer in the science of photography in the United States.

He was born in Newburyport, Massachusetts on November 13, 1804 in "one of the upper chambers" of the Wolfe Tavern, a local hotel and restaurant of which his father, Thomas Perkins, was briefly the innkeeper. Perkins graduated with an undergraduate degree from Harvard in 1824 and graduated from Harvard Medical School in 1827.

He married Harriet Davenport in 1828.

In addition to his medical practice, Perkins was interested in a wide variety of scientific topics and he kept abreast of the scientific discoveries of his day. After immersing himself in the innovations of French photography pioneer Louis Daguerre, Perkins created some of the earliest landscape photographs in the United States using the daguerreotype method, also known as "solar painting". His daguerreotype depicting a view of the city of Newburyport, Massachusetts taken from the steeple of a church in October 1839 was included in the exhibition East of the Mississippi: Nineteenth-Century American Landscape Photography at the National Gallery of Art in Washington, D.C., in 2017. Diane Waggoner, who curated the 2017 exhibition, explains that “Perkins was among the first to adapt the bird’s-eye perspective to the daguerreotype. Correlating to the kind of compositions found in topographical prints, his photographic town view was likely the first to be made in the United States.” Perkins gave a lecture on daguerreotypes and displayed his recent photographs in this area at the Newburyport Lyceum in February 1840.

Henry Coit Perkins died at 68 on February 1, 1873. He is buried, along with his wife Harriet Davenport, in the Oak Hill Cemetery in Newburyport. His daguerrotypes and papers, as well as a portrait, are in the collection of the Museum of Old Newbury, in Newburyport.
