= Edwin B. Harvey =

American physician, politician (1834–1913)

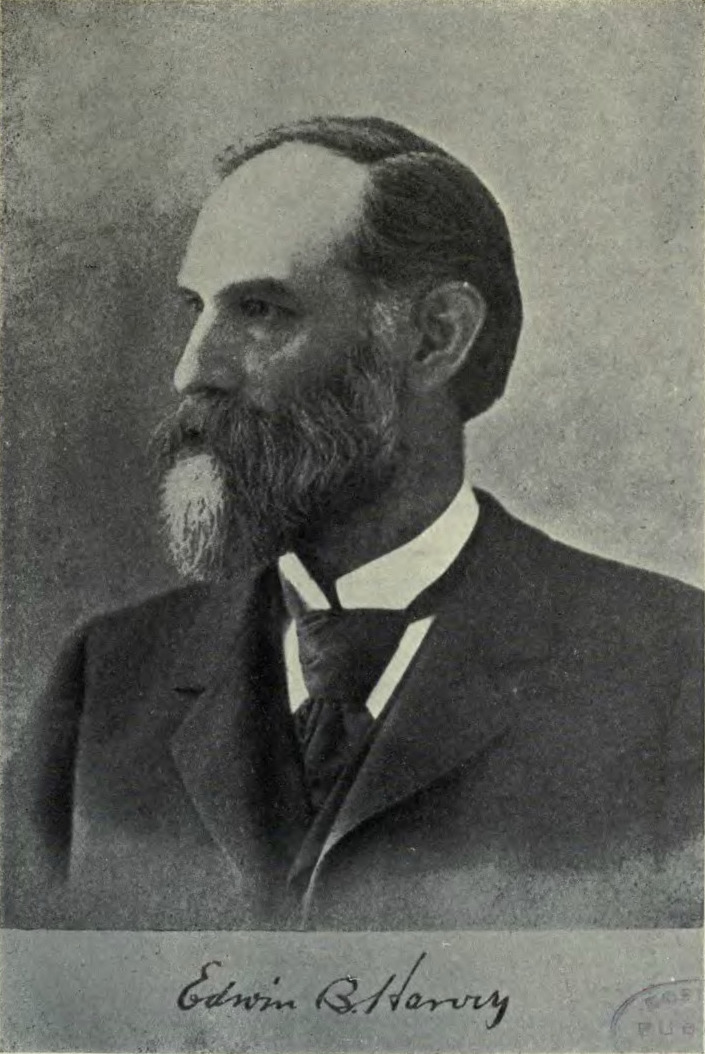

Member of the Massachusetts Senate for the 2nd Worcester district
- In office 1894–1895
- Preceded by: George K. Nichols
- Succeeded by: William H. Cook

Member of the Massachusetts House of Representatives for the 4th Worcester district
- In office 1884–1885
- Preceded by: Fitch A. Winchester
- Succeeded by: Horace F. Webster

Personal details
- Born: April 4, 1834 Deerfield, New Hampshire, U.S.
- Died: September 28, 1913 (aged 79) Westborough, Massachusetts, U.S.
- Party: Republican
- Spouse: Abby Kimball Tenney (m. 1860)
- Education: Wesleyan University; Harvard Medical School
- Occupation: Teacher; Physician

Edwin Bayard Harvey (April 4, 1834 – September 28, 1913) was an American educator, physician, and government official who helped establish the Massachusetts board of registration in medicine and served as its secretary and executive officer. He had a medical practice in Westborough, Massachusetts and held political office in the town.

== Early life ==
Harvey was born on April 4, 1834, in Deerfield, New Hampshire, to Ebenezer and Rozella Harvey. His father was a farmer and stone mason. He attended the local public schools, the Military Institute in Pembroke, New Hampshire, and the New Hampshire Conference Seminary. On July 30, 1860, he married Abby Kimball Tenney in Concord, New Hampshire. They had no children.

== Education ==
Harvey graduated from Wesleyan University in 1859. He taught natural science and mathematics at the Troy Conference Seminary in Poultney, Vermont for a year, the served as the principal of the Macedon Academy in Macedon, New York from 1861 to 1862. From 1862 to 1864, he was a natural science teacher at the Wilbraham Wesleyan Academy.

From 1869 to 1887, Harvey was a member of the Westborough school board. He was the district's superintendent of schools from 1887 to 1890. From 1873 to 1879, he was a trustee of the State Reform School for Boys.

== Medicine ==
While in Wilbraham, Harvey became friends with a local physician and became interested in medicine. He entered Harvard Medical School in 1864 and graduated two years later. In 1872, he studied at hospitals in Leipzig and Vienna.

Harvey established a practice in Waukegan, Illinois, but left after a short while and returned to Massachusetts. He settled in Westborough, where he became the town's leading physician and established a large consultation practice. He ceased actively practicing in 1895. He was a councilor of the Massachusetts Medical Society for over thirty years and was its president from 1898 to 1900.

== Politics ==
Harvey was a member of the Massachusetts House of Representatives in 1884 and 1885. During his first year, he introduced and helped pass legislation that provided free textbooks in public schools. He was a member of the committee on public charitable institutions both years and was chairman during the latter term.

Harvey was a member of the Massachusetts Senate in 1894 and 1895 and authored the bill that created the Massachusetts board of registration in medicine. He resigned near the end of the 1895 Massachusetts legislative session at the behest of Governor Frederic T. Greenhalge to become the board's secretary and executive officer. He held this position from June 20, 1895 to April 1, 1913, when he resigned due to ill health. He died on September 28, 1913 at his home in Westborough. A school in Westborough was named in his honor.
