= Anthony L. Komaroff =

American physician

Anthony Komaroff
- Born: Anthony L. Komaroff; June 7, 1941 (age 85); Milwaukee, Wisconsin
- Citizenship: American
- Education: Stanford University (A.B.), University of Washington (M.D.)
- Spouse: Lydia Villa-Komaroff
- Scientific career
- Fields: General internal medicine, Clinical epidemiology
- Workplaces: Harvard Medical School, Brigham and Women's Hospital

Anthony L. Komaroff (born June 7, 1941) is an American physician, clinical investigator, editor, and publisher. He serves as the Distinguished Simcox-Clifford-Higby Professor of Medicine at Harvard Medical School and Senior Physician at Brigham and Women's Hospital in Boston.

== Early life ==
Anthony "Tony" Komaroff was raised in Los Angeles, California. He attended college at Stanford University and medical school at the University of Washington in Seattle. There, he met his future wife, molecular biologist Lydia Villa-Komaroff. He and his wife traveled together to Maryland and then to Boston to complete their education, and begin their careers.

== Career ==
Following medical school, Komaroff received training in internal medicine at Harvard Medical School interrupted by two years at the National Institutes of Health, and then joined the faculty of Harvard Medical School in 1971. He had an active medical practice for 45 years, has taught medical students and doctors, conducted research, has served as a medical editor, and held several leadership positions.

=== Leadership positions ===
Komaroff was the director of the Division of General Medicine and Primary Care at Brigham & Women's Hospital, Boston MA, from 1982 to 1997, and built one of the world’s renowned academic general internal medicine divisions. From 1982 to 1987, he was the vice president for management systems of Brigham and Women's Hospital, with oversight of the Hospital's computer systems.

From 1997 through January 2015, he served as editor-in-chief of the Harvard Health Publishing Division (HHP) of Harvard Medical School, the division responsible for publishing all of the School's health information for the general public—books, newsletters, internet content and doctors' office information. The information is published in multiple languages, in countries around the world .

=== Research ===
Komaroff has published over 300 research articles and book chapters, and two books, publications that have been cited by other scientists in 30,000 other publications https://scholar.google.com/citations?hl=en&user=wXKKrRcAAAAJ.

MYALGIC ENCEPHALOMYELITIS/CHRONIC FATIGUE SYNDROME AND LONG COVID. Since the early 1990’s, Dr. Komaroff’s research has focused on myalgic encephalomyelitis/chronic fatigue syndrome and its similarities with Long COVID and post-acute infection syndrome. He was part of teams led by the Centers for Disease Control and Prevention to create the first case definitions of the illness, he conducted epidemiological studies to determine the prevalence of the illness and the types of people affected, and has helped identify some of the underlying physical/biological abnormalities seen in people with these illnesses—abnormalities involving the brain and autonomic nervous system, the immune system, energy metabolism and oxidative stress (redox imbalance), blood vessels, and the gut microbiome.

When it was suggested that the illness might be caused by a group of animal retroviruses, he was part of a team that found this claim to be invalid.

Regarding his work on myalgic encephalomyelitis/chronic fatigue syndrome and Long COVID, Dr. Komaroff has served on advisory committees of various scientific organizations including the United States Department of Health and Human Services, the National Institutes of Health, the Centers for Disease Control and Prevention and the National Academies of Sciences, Engineering and Medicine. A textbook chapter he coauthored summarizes the current state of knowledge about myalgic encephalomyelitis/ chronic fatigue syndrome.

Early in the COVID pandemic, Komaroff and colleagues published an article predicting that the pandemic might leave a fraction of patients suffering from an illness that had symptoms very similar to those of myalgic encephalomyelitis/chronic fatigue syndrome and lasted for years. Indeed, an illness—Long COVID—with similar symptoms developed among some people who became ill with COVID-19. Long COVID may affect from 60 to 400 million individuals, globally, and cost global economies trillions of dollars in the coming decades.

Komaroff then examined the evidence that the two illnesses not only had similar symptoms but also similar underlying physical/biological abnormalities. In another publication, he summarized the evidence that both myalgic encephalomyelitis/chronic fatigue syndrome and Long COVID might be examples of a larger group of illnesses that are triggered by either infection or non-infectious major injury: post-acute infection syndrome.

Finally, Komaroff proposed how all of the underlying physical/biological abnormalities that have been found in myalgic encephalomyelitis/chronic fatigue syndrome may cause the symptoms of the illness, and may explain why the symptoms persist for years—a theory that offers some targets for treatment of the illness.

HUMAN HERPESVIRUS-6A/B. Two similar viruses—human herpesvirus 6A and human herpesvirus 6B—were discovered in the late 1980’s. Because they infect most human beings early in life, and because the infection lasts for a lifetime, their role in causing disease has been difficult to determine, since most infected people have no disease from the virus. Human herpesvirus-6B is the primary cause of the common childhood illness exanthem subitem. Both viruses can infect brain cells and have been linked to multiple different neurological conditions and gynecological/obstetrical conditions.

Based on both epidemiologic and virologic data, Komaroff and others speculated that these two viruses might have integrated their genome into the DNA of a human egg or sperm cell at some time in human history, resulting in some people carrying the viral genes along with their own human genes in the chromosomes of every cell in their body. Subsequent research and publications in which Komaroff was a coinvestigator revealed that this is, in fact, the case and that this condition affects 1-2% of people on earth. This condition has recently been called “endogenous human herpesvirus-6”.

=== Editorial roles ===
HEALTH INFORMATION FOR THE GENERAL PUBLIC. Komaroff was the editor in chief of the best-selling book, the Harvard Medical School Family Health Guide;. He was for 25 years the editor-in-chief of the Harvard Health Letter, a newsletter from Harvard Medical School for the general public ; and from 2011-December 2016 was the author of a daily newspaper column, Ask Doctor K, that was syndicated by United Media and appeared in over 400 newspapers in North America.

HEALTH INFORMATION FOR PRACTICING PHYSICIANS. Komaroff was the founding editor of NEJM Journal Watch, a publication started in 1987 by The New England Journal of Medicine . The publication helps practicing physicians stay informed about the latest biomedical research. He also authored a series of articles in the widely-read medical journal JAMA describing major new biomedical discoveries to practicing physicians and other health professionals

Finally, Komaroff also served as editor of the autobiographies of two biomedical scientists, Nobel Laureates Joseph E. Murray, who pioneered human organ transplantation and Thomas H. Weller, who helped discover how to grow polio virus in cultures of various types of tissue, leading to the development of the polio vaccine, the discovery of other viruses and the development of many other vaccines

== Honors ==
- Elected a fellow of the American Association for the Advancement of Science, the American College of Physicians, and the Association for Health Services Research.
- Served on advisory committees for the United States Department of Health and Human Services, the Surgeon General of the United States, the Centers for Disease Control and Prevention, and the Institute of Medicine/National Academy of Sciences.
- Currently a member of the Scientific Advisory Board of the HHV-6 Foundation.
