= Loring Hall Cinema =

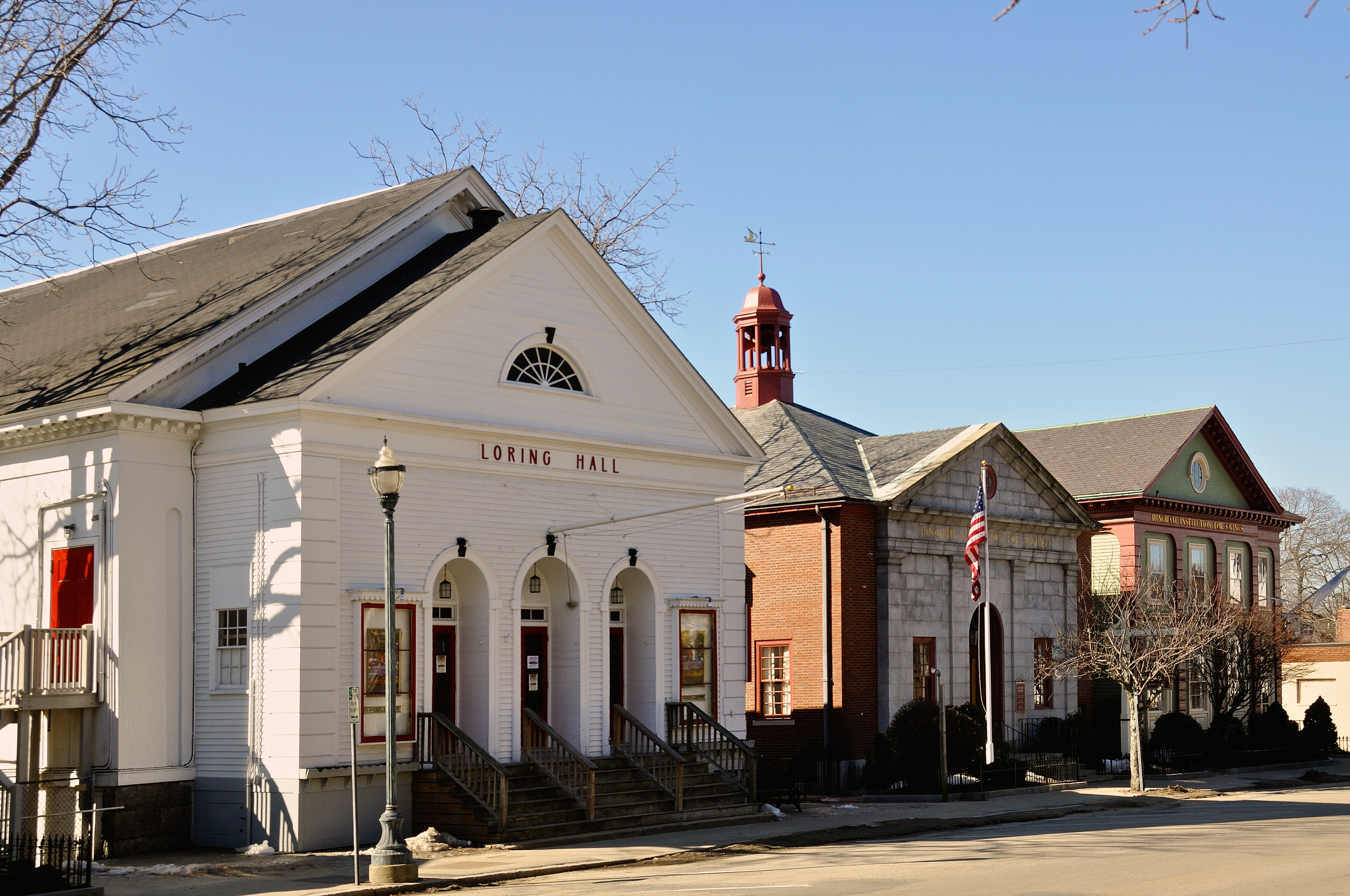
- Front of Loring Hall (2009)
- Interactive map of Loring Hall Cinema
- Address: 65 Main Street
- Location: Hingham, Massachusetts, USA
- Coordinates: 42.2413072°N 70.888106°W
- Owner: Patriot Cinemas
- Capacity: 280
- Type: Single Screen Movie Theater

Construction
- Opened: 1852
- Architect: Ammi B. Young

Loring Hall Cinema (known commonly as Loring Hall) is a historic building located in downtown Hingham, Massachusetts. The cinema was originally opened in 1852 as a meeting hall with the intent to provide the town with a suitable building for lectures, picnics, and social meetings of all kinds. In 1936, the building was converted into a single screen motion picture house that still operates today. The Loring Hall cinema is currently run by the local Patriot Cinemas company.

The facility was purchased by Philip Scott in February 1964. On June 17, 1981, The Hingham Historical Society presented the Scott family with an architectural recognition award for their effort to maintain the architectural heritage of the town.
