= Journal Watch =

NEJM Journal Watch is a series of topic-specific newsletters written for physicians and other health professionals. It is published by the Massachusetts Medical Society and is a sibling publication to the New England Journal of Medicine.

NEJM Journal Watch distributes its products via print, e-mail, and its website.

== Mission ==
The goal of NEJM Journal Watch is to provide physicians and allied health professionals with current, clinically focused information and commentary regarding their respective practice areas and medical disciplines. The organization accomplishes this by utilizing a board of physicians and editors who monitor scientific and medical journals for relevant articles, summarize the articles, and provide additional commentary about the topic.

NEJM Journal Watch divides its content into areas of primary care, specialty care, and specific watch topics.

== Editorial Board ==
The editor-in-chief is Raja-Elie Badulnour. Anthony L. Komaroff is Founding Editor.

== Primary Care ==
NEJM Journal Watch focuses on four specific areas of primary care:

- General Medicine
- Pediatrics and Adolescent Medicine
- Women's Health
- Hospital Medicine

== Specialty Care ==
NEJM Journal Watch creates content in eight different specialty care areas:

- Cardiology
- Dermatology
- Emergency Medicine
- Gastroenterology
- Infectious Diseases
- Neurology
- Psychiatry

== Watch Topics ==
In addition to primary and specialty care areas, NEJM Journal Watch maintains a current database of journal articles and commentary for several important medical topics:

- Aging & geriatrics
- Allergies & asthma
- Bone and joint disease
- Breast cancer
- Depression & anxiety
- Diabetes
- GERD
- Gynecology
- Hepatitis
- Lipid management
- Nutrition & obesity
- Pediatric infections
- Peptic ulcers
- Pregnancy & infertility
- Respiratory infections
- Sexually transmitted diseases
- Skin cancer
- Stroke
- Substance abuse

== See also ==
- List of medical journals
