= George Cheyne Shattuck Sr. =

American physician (1783–1854)

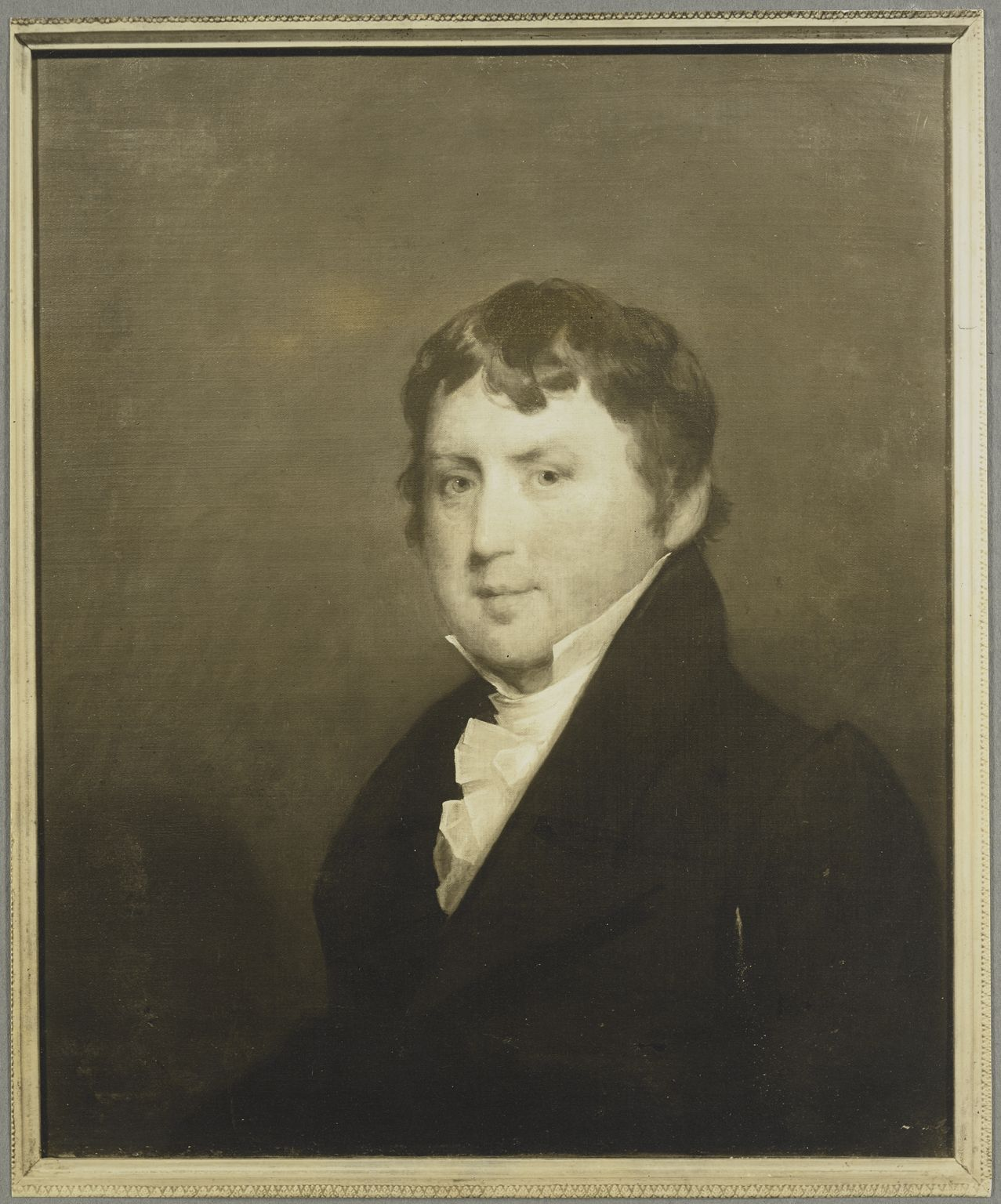
- Born: George Cheyne Shattuck; July 17, 1783; Templeton, Massachusetts, U.S.
- Died: March 18, 1854 (aged 70); Boston, Massachusetts, U.S.
- Education: Dartmouth College; Dartmouth Medical School
- Occupation: Physician
- Known for: Funding construction of the Shattuck Observatory
- Spouses: Eliza Cheever Davis (m. 1811; died 1828); Amelia Hepsibah Bigelow (m. 1836)
- Children: 7, including George Jr.

George Cheyne Shattuck Sr. (July 17, 1783 – March 18, 1854) was an American medical doctor who was president of the American Statistical Association from 1846 to 1851. A graduate of Dartmouth College, he provided funding for its Shattuck Observatory.

== Early life ==
Shattuck was born on July 17, 1783, in Templeton, Massachusetts, to Dr. Benjamin and Lucia (Barron) Shattuck. He was a sixth generation descendant of William Shattuck. His maternal grandfather, Jonathan Barron, was a British Army officer who was killed during the Battle of Lake George in the French and Indian War. Shattuck received $1,300 from his father's estate, which he used to pay for his education at Dartmouth College. As there wasn't any public transportation available from Templeton to Hanover, New Hampshire, Shattuck made the trip by horse. Once he reached Hanover, he sold the horse in exchange for room and board. Shattuck received his Bachelor of Arts and Master of Arts degrees in 1903. He then studied medicine under Nathan Smith. He received his Bachelor of Medicine, Bachelor of Surgery and Doctor of Medicine degrees from the Dartmouth School of Medicine in 1807 and 1812, respectively. He received honorary degrees from Harvard College (A.M., 1807), the University of Pennsylvania (M.D., 1807), Bowdoin College (M.D., 1851), and Dartmouth College (LL.D., 1853) In 1810, he was elected a fellow of the American Academy of Arts and Sciences.

== Career ==
In 1807, Shattuck moved to Boston, where he commenced the practice of medicine and continued his studies under Dr. Samuel Danforth. He practiced until a few weeks before his death. He was president of the Massachusetts Medical Society from 1836 to 1840. He was a founding member of the American Statistical Association. He served as the organization's vice president from 1840 to 1845 and was its president from 1846 to 1851.

== Philanthropy ==
Shattuck donated generously to Dartmouth College. He contributed greatly to its library and presented the college with portraits of Daniel Webster, Joseph Hopkinson, Jeremiah Mason, Jeremiah Smith, who represented the school in Dartmouth College v. Woodward. He gave $7,000 to cover the construction and equipment costs for the Shattuck Observatory, with the stipulation that the trustees match the gift with an additional $4,000.

At Harvard University, Shattuck founded endowed scholarships and a medical professorship.

== Personal life and death ==
In October 1811, Shattuck married Eliza Cheever Davis, daughter of Caleb Davis. They had seven children, although only one, George Cheyne Shattuck Jr., would survive him. Eliza Shattuck died on June 15, 1828. In August 1836, he married Amelia Hepsibah Bigelow.

Shattuck died from heart disease on March 18, 1854.
