= Jonathan S. Berek =

American obstetrician

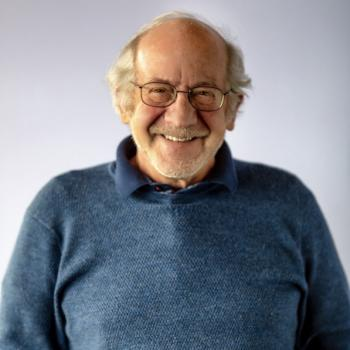
- Born: April 21, 1948 (age 78)
- Occupations: Founding Director, Stanford Women’s Cancer Center Senior Advisor, Stanford Cancer Institute; Co-Director, Senior Academy at Stanford; President, Stanford University Phi Beta Kappa; Executive Director and Founder, Stanford Health Communication Initiative; Faculty Director, Health Communication, Stanford Center for Health Education; Founder and Director, Stanford Under One Umbrella Fundraising Gala, Stanford Medicine, Stanford Women’s Cancer Center
- Known for: Stanford University School of Medicine faculty and endowed professor; Author of medical scholarship and research in oncology and immunology; Director, MedArts Films
- Title: Laurie Kraus Lacob Professor; Stanford University School of Medicine
- Awards: Lifetime Achievement Award, International Gynecologic Cancer Society; Lifetime Achievement Award, American Cancer Society

Academic background
- Education: Brown University (AB, MMSc); Johns Hopkins School of Medicine (MD); Harvard Medical School (postdoctoral & instructor); UCLA School of Medicine (fellow); Stanford University School of Medicine (Distinguished Careers Institute fellow)

Academic work
- Notable works: Berek & Hacker’s Gynecologic Oncology (7th edition); Berek & Novak’s Gynecology (17th edition)

Jonathan Samuel Berek, MD, MMSc (born April 21, 1948) is the Laurie Kraus Lacob Professor at the Stanford University School of Medicine, Founding Director of the Stanford Women's Cancer Center, and Senior Advisor for the Stanford Cancer Institute. He is also the former Chair of the Department of Obstetrics and Gynecology at Stanford (2005-2012). Prior to joining the faculty at Stanford in 2005, he was Professor at the UCLA School of Medicine.

Additionally, Berek is a documentary film director and producer, Director of MedArts Films, and founder of the Under One Umbrella annual fundraising gala. He has received numerous honors, including a Lifetime Achievement Award from the International Gynecologic Cancer Society and the American Cancer Society. In 2017, Dr. Berek was selected as a Fellow in the Stanford Distinguished Careers Institute.

== Personal life ==
Jonathan S. Berek was born in Sioux City, Iowa, in St. Monica’s Home, then adopted by Samual I. and Janet Graetz Berek and raised in a family with his adopted sister Joyce in Fremont, Nebraska.

Dr. Berek attended Fremont Senior High School in Nebraska, where he was elected Student Body President and Captain of the swimming team. In 1965, he was an American Field Service foreign exchange student to Brussels, Belgium. He performed in musical theatre and vocal music groups, and he toured in the Midwest with a folk and bluegrass group, the Vagabonds. He was an Eagle Scout and a radio announcer at KHUB radio in Fremont. After graduating from high school in 1966, he moved to the east coast for university, medical school and medical training.

While studying at Brown University, Dr. Berek was on the water polo team, sang in musical groups, and performed roles in numerous theatre productions, notably as Jean Paul Marat in Marat Sade. He wrote the book and lyrics for his original musical play, Pits, that was produced at Brown. He was also a professional actor in the Monomoy Theatre Company, Chatham, MA, in 1969.

Dr. Berek married Deborah L. Berek in 1970, a practicing artist whose art studio is in Santa Monica, California. The two have three children—Jonathan Micah Berek (1975), James Samuel Berek (1979), Jessica Evelyn Berek Reilly (1988)—and two grandchildren—Fiona Berek (2004) and Maclay Berek (2010).

Dr. Berek's biological heritage is Helen Mucha Winberg Porter (maternal—Eastern European); Everett Osterholt (paternal—German-Irish); Tasha Zemrus, MD (first cousin); and Alphones Mucha (distant cousin).

== Education ==
Dr. Berek attended Brown University, where he earned an undergraduate Bachelor’s degree (AB) in English literature and theater arts (1970), as well as a Master of Medical Sciences (MMSc) degree in biomedical sciences (1973). Afterward, he earned his Doctor of Medicine (MD) degree from Johns Hopkins School of Medicine (1975). Then he was appointed as an Instructor on the Harvard Medical School faculty (1975-79) and completed a residency at Harvard Medical School, Brigham and Women's Hospital—now Mass General Brigham (1979). He completed a fellowship in gynecologic oncology at the UCLA School of Medicine, 1979-1981.

== Career ==
=== Early Career and Faculty Positions at UCLA ===
Dr. Berek began his academic career as an Instructor at Harvard Medical School from 1975 to 1979. After a fellowship at UCLA (1979-1981), he joined the faculty of the UCLA School of Medicine—now the David Geffen School of Medicine at UCLA—where he was appointed Assistant Professor in 1981, Associate Professor with tenure in 1984, and Professor in 1989.

Serving as the Director of the UCLA Division of Gynecologic Oncology from 1986-2005, he was an active oncologic physician and surgeon, with a principal focus on the development of immunotherapy and novel treatments for ovarian cancer. From 1988 to 2005, he served as the Vice Chair of the Department of Obstetrics and Gynecology at the UCLA School of Medicine.

In 2004, he received the Sherman Mellinkoff Faculty Award—the highest distinction that the UCLA School of Medicine grants to its faculty.

In addition to his administrative and clinical roles, he maintained a research laboratory conducting basic scientific research in immunology. His early discoveries included the elucidation of the role of intraperitoneal immune cells and their mechanisms of activation, including cytokines and their receptors via paracrine growth loop. Dr. Berek’s laboratory characterized the role of Natural Killer (NK) lymphocytes, interferons and interleukins in the peritoneal cavity and their involvement in the regulation of ovarian cancer cell growth. He pioneered the development of regional, intraperitoneal (IP) immunotherapy using cytokines, which serves as the basis for current IP immunotherapies in ovarian cancer, including cell-based therapies. His current research focuses on clinical trials of immune and novel agents for cancer treatment and genetics.

Dr. Berek’s other noteworthy research contributions included the development and refinement of surgical operations for ovarian and vulvar cancer. His other roles at UCLA included Chair of the UCLA College of Applied Anatomy and Chief of Staff of the UCLA Medical Center (1994-1996).

During this time, Dr. Berek also became a leader in a number of local and regional organizations in the field, including the Gynecologic Oncology Group (GOG), where he served as the Principal Investigator from 1986 to 2005. He received the President’s Award from the Society of Gynecologic Oncologists (SGO) in 1987 and served as the President of the Western Association of Gynecologic Oncology (WAGO) from 1991 to 1992. Later in his tenure at UCLA, in 2004, Dr. Berek was also Group Chair for the Cooperative Group for Immunotherapy of Ovarian Cancer, a position he held until 2011. Dr. Berek is the current Group Chair of the Cooperative Gynecologic Oncology Investigators (COGI). He is the recent past Chair of the Women’s Cancer Committee of the International Federation of Obstetrics and Gynecology (FIGO), and he contributed to the FIGO staging systems for ovarian, fallopian tube, peritoneal, cervical, uterine, and vulvar cancers. Dr. Berek received numerous grants to support his laboratory and clinical research.

=== Faculty Positions at Stanford and Obstetrics & Gynecology Leadership Roles ===
In 2005, Dr. Berek transitioned to the Stanford University School of Medicine as the Laurie Kraus Lacob Professor and served a twelve-year tenure as Chair of the Department of Obstetrics and Gynecology until 2017. During this time, Dr. Berek took on national and international leadership positions as well. From 2008 to 2010, Dr. Berek was the President of the International Gynecologic Cancer Society (IGSC), and from 2011 to 2013, he became the President of the Council of University Chairs of Obstetrics & Gynecology (CUCOG).

Today, Dr. Berek is the Founding Director of the Stanford Women’s Cancer Center, a part of the Stanford Cancer Institute, and a member of the Executive Committee of the Gynecologic Cancer InterGroup (GCIG) (2017).

==== Health Communication ====
Dr. Berek founded the Stanford Health Communication Initiative in 2017 and serves as its Executive Director. He is also the Faculty Director of Health Communication in the Stanford Center for Health Education. He is responsible for naming, initiating, and helping create the Advancing Communication Excellence (ACES) program at Stanford Hospital, which is now a required communication course for all Stanford Health Care providers on the medical staff. Dr. Berek spoke about high stakes communication in medical settings and his work as a storyteller for the Think Fast Talk Smart podcast on February 19th, 2026.

==== Research Symposiums ====
The Stanford Cancer Institute and the Stanford Center for Continuing Medical Education have held two research symposiums in honor of Dr. Jonathan Berek.

The first research symposium on gynecologic oncology was held on Friday, September 12^{th}, 2025. The event served as an update on the latest scientific advances in gynecologic oncology, gathering physicians and scientists from all around the world to present emerging research and advances, focusing most specifically on gynecologic and breast cancer. Topics discussed at the symposium included genetic testing, immunotherapy, organoid modeling, computational biology, and novel clinical trial data. One of the featured guest speakers was Nobel Laureate Carolyn Bertozzi.

The second research symposium was held on Thursday, September 10th, 2026, presenting emerging research and advances in gynecologic oncology, with a focus on ovarian and breast cancer. Dr. Robert C. Bast, Jr., MD, the clinician-scientist who discovered CA125, served as the keynote speaker, and several other research scientists and professors spoke about topics including genetic testing, immunotherapy, organoid modeling, computational biology, and novel clinical trial data. The discussion helped audiences to understand the genomic landscape, therapeutic resistance, and precision medicine approaches, and to gain actionable insights to support evidence-based treatment planning and improved patient outcomes in gynecologic oncology practice.

== Publications and Books ==
During his career as a professor, Dr. Berek has authored various research manuscripts and publications advancing ideas in medicine, including numerous books, more than 375 peer-reviewed articles, various contributed manuscripts, national and international conference presentations, many invited lectureships, and hundreds of book chapters. Most notably, his books, Berek & Hacker’s Gynecologic Oncology (7th edition) and Berek & Novak’s Gynecology (17th edition) are leading texts in the field.

=== Bibliography (books) ===
- Berek JS, Berek & Novak’s Gynecology, 17th edition, Wolters Kluwer, Philadelphia, 2026
- Berek JS. Berek & Hacker’s Gynecologic Oncology, 8th edition, Wolters Kluwer, Philadelphia, 2026.
- Tarney C, Berek. JS. Operative Techniques in Gynecologic Surgery: Urogynecology. Philadelphia, Wolters Kluwer, 2018.
- Hatch K, Berek JS. Operative Techniques in Gynecologic Surgery: Gynecologic Oncology. Philadelphia, Wolters Kluwer, 2018.
- Nakajima ST, McCoy TW, Krause MS, Berek JS. Operative Techniques in Gynecologic Surgery: Reproductive Endocrinology and Infertility. Philadelphia, Wolters Kluwer, 2017.
- Falcone T, Uy-Kroh MJ, Bradley LD, Berek JS. Operative Techniques in Gynecologic Surgery: Gynecology. Philadelphia, Wolters Kluwer, 2017.
- Berek JS. Series Editor. Operative Techniques in Gynecologic Surgery. Philadelphia, Wolters Kluwer, 2017.
- Blumenthal P, Berek JS. Office Gynecology. Philadelphia, Lippincott Williams & Wilkins, 2013.
- Berek JS, Rubin S, ed., Precis: Gynecologic Oncology. 4th edition. American College of Obstetrics and Gynecologists. 2010.
- Hillard PJA, Berek JS, et al., eds. Guidelines for Women’s Health Care. American College of Obstetricians and Gynecologists. Washington, DC Women’s Health Care Physicians, 2007.
- Berek JS. ed, PROLOG Task Force on Gynecologic Oncology and Critical Care, 5th edition ACOG, 2006.
- Berek JS, ed. Precis: Gynecologic Oncology. Third edition. American College of Obstetricians and Gynecologists, Washington, DC, 2006.
- Berek JS. Novak’s Gynecology Study Guide. Second edition. Lippincott Williams and Wilkins, Philadelphia, 2002.
- Berek JS. Gynecologic Malignancies. Section Editor In: Haskell CM, ed. Cancer Treatment, 5th edition, W.B. Saunders, Philadelphia, 2000.
- Berek JS. ed., Gynecologic Cancers Section. In Handbook of Cancer Therapy. Cashaito D., ed., Little, Brown, Co., Boston, 2000.
- Berek JS, Runowicz C, eds, Gynecologic Oncology and Pelvic Surgery, 4th edition, PROLOG, American College of Obstetricians and Gynecologists, Washington, DC, 2000.
- Gore ME, Schwartz P, Berek JS, Kavanagh J. Ovarian Tumours, ISIS Medical Media, London, 2000.
- Berek JS, et al, eds. Women’s Health Encyclopedia. American College of Obstetricians and Gynecologists, Washington, DC, 2000.
- Sharp F, Blackett A, Berek JS, Bast RC. Ovarian Cancer 5. London: Chapman & Hall Medical, 1998.
- Olive D, Berek JS. Study Guide to Novak’s Gynecology, Berek JS, editor, Williams and Wilkins, Baltimore, 1998.
- Sharp F, Blackett A, Leake R, Berek JS. Ovarian Cancer 4. London: Chapman & Hall Medical, 1996.
- Parker WH, Berek JS. Management of the pelvic mass by operative laparoscopy. In: Soderstrom RM, ed. Operative Laparoscopy. 2nd ed. New York: Raven, 1996.
- Sharp F, Mason P, Blackett A, Berek JS. Ovarian Cancer 3: Biology, Diagnosis and Management. London: Chapman & Hall Medical, 1994.
- Greer B, Berek JS. Gynecologic Oncology: Treatment Rationale and Technique. Amsterdam: Elsevier, 1991.
- Berek JS. Gynecologic Oncology. Section Editor. In: Hacker NF, Moore JG, eds. Essentials of Obstetrics and Gynecology, Second Edition. Philadelphia: W.B. Saunders, 1991.

Previous editions of these books can be found on Dr. Berek’s Curriculum Vitae.

== Documentary Filmmaking ==
Alongside his medical career, Dr. Berek also developed a passion for creating and directing documentary films on various medical topics, including cancer patient stories, several cancer subjects, and the cancer journey mindset.

=== Filmography ===
==== Documentary Short Films (Director) ====
- Embracing the Challenge (2013)
- I Can Picture You (2014)
- Advances in Research (2016)
- Survivors (2016)
- Cesarean Hysterectomy—Prevention of Maternal Hemorrhage (2016)
- Legacy of Hope: Nothing Is Worth More than This Day (2017)
- Gilogene (2019)
- Discovery & Hope (2019)
- Research Progress in Women’s Cancer (2020)
- Women, Living with Cancer (2022)
- Cancer Screening in Sweden (2023)
- Discover Stanford DCI (2024)
- Tribute to Laurie (2025)
- Street Crisis Response Teams of San Francisco (2026) – to be released

==== Documentary Short Films (Producer) ====
- In Some Dark Valley – The Testimony of Reverend Brand (2026) – to be released

==== Documentary Series (Director) ====
- Stanford Distinguished Careers Institute (2014-2024) – 3 episodes
- Mindset (2020) – 8 episodes
- Common Health Conditions (2021) – 127 episodes
- Mindset Yoga (2024) – 8 episodes – to be released

==== Trailers (Director) ====
- Mindset (2020)

== Philanthropy and Involvement with Under One Umbrella ==
In 2009, Dr. Berek helped to found the Under One Umbrella charity fundraiser and annual gala, with the main goal of encouraging and supporting the work of the Stanford Women's Cancer Center. The Center’s programming is devoted to the search for better means for prevention, early detection, and treatment for women’s cancers through innovative research that leads to fundamental discoveries. Nicole Kidman, a long-time friend of Dr. Berek, serves as an Honorary Chair of the Under One Umbrella steering committee, and has supported and served in her role since the fundraiser’s inception in 2009. Nicole Kidman was joined by Trisha Yearwood as Honorary Co-Chair in 2012. Under One Umbrella philanthropy efforts have generated substantial support for innovative research programs in women’s cancer via concerts headlined by celebrities, including Nicole Kidman, Keith Urban, Trisha Yearwood, Garth Brooks, Tom Hanks, Rita Wilson, Carrie Underwood, Sheryl Crow, Vince Gill, Amy Grant, Wilson Phillips, Darlene Love, and Harry Connick Jr.

Under One Umbrella has raised over $75 million in total since its inception. The gala raised over $2.7 million in 2025 alone.

== Notable Honors and Awards ==
For his research and charitable contributions to the field of gynecologic oncology and obstetrics research throughout his career, Dr. Berek has received myriad honors and awards.

=== Most Notable Recognitions ===
- (2004) Sherman Mellinkoff Faculty Award, David Geffen School of Medicine at UCLA
- (2010) Recipient, John C. Fremont Pathfinder Award, John C. Fremont Pathfinder Award
- (2012- present) Laurie Kraus Lacob Endowed Professorship, Stanford University School of Medicine
- (2020) Lifetime Achievement Award, American Cancer Society
- (2023) Lifetime Achievement Award, International Gynecologic Cancer Society
- (2024) Endowed Fellowship in Gynecologic Oncology in honor of Dr. Jonathan S. Berek, Stanford Division of Gynecologic Oncology
- (2025) President, Stanford University Phi Beta Kappa, Stanford University Beta Chapter
- (2025) 1st Stanford Gynecologic Research Symposium in honor of Dr. Jonathan S. Berek, Stanford Cancer Institute & Stanford Division of Gynecologic Oncology

=== Other Awards and Recognitions ===
- (1965-1966) American Field Service Scholarship, American Field Service
- (1967-1970) Dean’s List, Brown University
- (1967-1970) William S. Cherry, Jr. Scholar, Brown University
- (1972) Sigma Xi, Brown University
- (1975) Graduation with Honors, Johns Hopkins University School of Medicine
- (1975) Koennecke Award in Gynecology, Johns Hopkins University School of Medicine
- (1975) Alpha Omega Alpha, Johns Hopkins University School of Medicine
- (1975) Phi Beta Kappa, Johns Hopkins University School of Medicine
- (1978-1979) Administrative Chief Resident, Obstetrics & Gynecology, Harvard Medical School
- (1985, 1987, 1995, 1997, 2003, 2004) Excellence in Teaching Award, UCLA Department of Obstetrics and Gynecology
- (1987) President’s Award, Society of Gynecologic Oncologists
- (1989) Who’s Who in the West, Who’s Who
- (1990, 1997) America’s 400 Best Cancer Specialists, Good Housekeeping Magazine
- (1991) President, Western Association of Gynecologic Oncologists
- (1991-1992) Bethesda II Committee, National Institutes of Health
- (1992-2001) Bethesda III Committee, National Institutes of Health
- (1992-2004) Best Doctors in America, The Best Doctors in America
- (1992-2015) Gynecology & Gynecologic Oncology, America’s Best Doctors
- (1993) American Men and Women of Science, American Men and Women of Science
- (1993) Who’s Who in America, Who’s Who
- (1994) Men of Achievement, Men of Achievement
- (1994) Who’s Who in the World, Who’s Who
- (1996, 2001) Best 2000 Doctors Gynecologic Oncology, American Health
- (1996-1997) Vice President, Society of Gynecologic Oncologists
- (1996-2003) The Best Doctors in America: Pacific Region, Best Doctors in America
- (1997) National Faculty Award, Council on Residency Education in Obstetrics & Gynecology
- (2000-2011) Best Doctors in America, Best Doctors in America
- (2003) Excellence in Education Award, David Geffen School of Medicine at UCLA
- (2003) Twenty-First Century Award for Achievement, Twenty-First Century Award
- (2004) Sherman Mellinkoff Faculty Award, David Geffen School of Medicine at UCLA
- (2004) America’s Top Doctors for Cancer, Gynecologic Oncology, America’s Top Doctors for Cancer
- (2004) Who’s Who in Science and Engineering, Who’s Who
- (2006-2007) Who’s Who in Medicine and Healthcare, Who’s Who
- (2006) America’s Top Obstetricians and Gynecologists, America’s Top Doctors
- (2007) Top Doctors—The A List, San Jose Magazine
- (2007) Highly Commended in Obstetrics & Gynaecology, Berek & Novak’s Gynecology, 14th ed.
- (2007) Highly Commended in Obstetrics & Gynaecology, British Medical Association
- (2007) Nominee Person of the Year, TIME Magazine
- (2007-2011) America’s Top Oncologists, America’s Top Oncologists
- (2008-2010) President, International Gynecologic Cancer Society
- (2008) America’s Top Oncologists, Consumers’ Research Council of America
- (2010) Recipient, John C. Fremont Pathfinder Award, John C. Fremont Pathfinder Award
- (2010) Member, Liaison Committee for Obstetrics and Gynecology (LCOG), Liaison Committee for Obstetrics and Gynecology
- (2011-2013) President, Council of University Chairs of Obstetrics & Gynecology (CUCOG)
- (2012- present) Laurie Kraus Lacob Endowed Professorship, Stanford University School of Medicine
- (2014) Fellow, American Society of Clinical Oncology
