= Gynecologic Oncology (journal) =

- Discipline: Gynecologic oncology
- Language: English
- Edited by: Beth Y. Karlan

Publication details
- History: 1972-present
- Publisher: Elsevier (The Netherlands)
- Frequency: Monthly
- Impact factor: 5.482 (2020)

Standard abbreviations
- ISO 4: Gynecol. Oncol.

Indexing
- CODEN: GYNOA3
- ISSN: 0090-8258 (print); 1095-6859 (web)
- OCLC no.: 01785628

Links
- Journal homepage; Online access

Gynecologic Oncology is a peer-reviewed medical journal covering all aspects of gynecologic oncology. The journal covers investigations relating to the etiology, diagnosis, and treatment of female cancers, as well as research from any of the disciplines related to this field of interest. It is published by Elsevier and is the official journal of the Society of Gynecologic Oncology.

== Abstracting and indexing ==
The journal is abstracted and indexed in Current Contents/Clinical Medicine, Index Medicus, Science Citation Index, and Scopus.
