= Ian Duncan =

Ian Duncan may refer to:

- Ian Duncan (rally driver) (born 1961), rally driver from Kenya
- Ian Duncan, Baron Duncan of Springbank (born 1973), British politician
- Ian Duncan (businessman), businessman active in the Australian resources sector
- Ian Duncan (actor), South African actor
- Ian Duncan (oncologist) (born 1943), British gynecological oncologist
- Ian Duncan (Community), a character in Community
- Ian Duncan (wrestler), Scottish wrestler

== See also ==
- Iain Duncan, Canadian ice hockey player and coach
- Iain Duncan Smith, UK politician
