= Subak (surname) =

Subak is a surname. Notable people with the name include:

- Leslee Subak, American gynecologist
- Susan Subak, American environmental scientist
