= Helga Salvesen =

Norwegian physician and professor

Helga Birgitte Salvesen (23 December 1963 – 20 January 2016) was a Norwegian physician and professor of medicine at the University of Bergen.

== Early life and education ==
Salvesen was born in Asker, but moved to Bergen at the age of four. She took the cand.med. degree in 1991 and the dr.med. degree in 2000, with the doctoral thesis Tumor Biomarkers and Prognostic Factors in Endometrial Carcinoma.

== Professional career ==
In 2003, Salvesen became chief physician at Haukeland University Hospital and professor of gynecology and obstetrics at the University of Bergen. She was co-director of the research Centre for Cancer Biomarkers at the University of Bergen.

In 2015 she was elected as a fellow of the Norwegian Academy of Science and Letters.

== Death and legacy ==
Salvesen died suddenly in January 2016. In 2017, the European Society of Gynaecological Oncology (ESGO) created an award in her memory to recognise researchers who excel in the field of gynecological cancer research.

== Personal life ==
She was married to fellow physician Pål Rasmus Njølstad in 1986, and had four children, all boys.
