= Fremont High School =

Fremont High School may refer to:

== United States ==
- John C. Fremont High School, Los Angeles, California
- Fremont High School (Oakland, California), formerly known as Fremont Federation of High Schools
- Fremont High School (Sunnyvale, California)
- North Fremont High School, Ashton, Idaho
- South Fremont High School, St. Anthony, Idaho
- Fremont High School (Indiana)
- Fremont High School (Fremont, Michigan)
- Fremont Senior High School (Nebraska)
- Fremont Ross High School, Fremont, Ohio
- Fremont High School (Utah), in Plain City

== Other places ==
- Fremont High School, Adelaide, now merged into Playford International College, in Elizabeth, South Australia

== See also ==
- Fremont Union High School District, Northern California, United States
