= Carol Brown (physician) =

Gynecologic oncologist

Carol L. Brown
- Born: Los Angeles, California, U.S.
- Education: M.D., Columbia University
- Medical career
- Profession: Gynecologic oncologist
- Institutions: Memorial Sloan Kettering Cancer Center; Weill Cornell Medical College

Carol L. Brown is the Nicholls-Biondi Chair for Health Equity at Memorial Sloan Kettering Cancer Center and a professor at Weill Cornell Medical College. She is a surgeon known for her work on gynecological cancers.

== Education and career ==
Brown's father was a surgeon who had a practice in Los Angeles, and this piqued her interest in medicine. Brown's undergraduate degree is from Harvard University. She earned her M.D. from Columbia University Medical School in 1986, and was elected to Alpha Omega Alpha, a medical honor society. She did her residency at the Hospital of the University of Pennsylvania. In 1990 she started her fellowship at Memorial Sloan Kettering and then became faculty in 1994. In 2005, she became the director of the group improving diversity in clinical care, research, and education. She is also a professor at Weill Cornell Medical College. In February 2021, she was the named the Nicholls-Biondi Chair for Health Equity.

Brown was the 2018 president of the Society of Gynecologic Oncology, making her the first black president of the organization.

Brown is known for her work addressing disparities in cancer care in medically under-served groups. She participated in a 2016 round table discussing the Cancer Moonshot with Vice President Joe Biden. Brown joined the board for the Biden Cancer Initiative in 2017 and led the panel at the 2018 Biden Cancer Initiative Inaugural Summit. She has made multiple presentations on TV and in the print media, for example advocating for regular screening for cancer.

== Selected publications ==
- Brown, CL; Lewis, JL Jr (1993). Markham M., Hoskins W. (ed.). 'Palliative surgery in ovarian cancer. New York: Raven Press. pp. 217–228. ISBN 0881679704.
- Boyd, Jeff (2000-05-03). "Clinicopathologic Features of BRCA-Linked and Sporadic Ovarian Cancer". JAMA. 283 (17): 2260–2265. doi:10.1001/jama.283.17.2260. ISSN 0098-7484. PMID 10807385.
- Jewell, Elizabeth L.; Huang, Juan Juan; Abu-Rustum, Nadeem R.; Gardner, Ginger J.; Brown, Carol L.; Sonoda, Yukio; Barakat, Richard R.; Levine, Douglas A.; Leitao, Mario M. (2014-05-01). "Detection of sentinel lymph nodes in minimally invasive surgery using indocyanine green and near-infrared fluorescence imaging for uterine and cervical malignancies". Gynecologic Oncology. 133 (2): 274–277. doi:10.1016/j.ygyno.2014.02.028. ISSN 0090-8258. PMC 5715808. PMID 24582865.

== Awards and honors ==
In 1984, Brown became the first recipient of the Malcolm X Memorial Scholarship from Columbia University’s College of Physicians and Surgeons. In 2017, Brown gave the American Association for Cancer Research's Jane Cooke Wright Memorial Lectureship. Brown was named a notable black executive by Crain's New York Business (2021) and has been noted as a top doctor in multiple publications presented by Castle Connolly Medical.
