= Leslee Subak =

American gynecologist

- Education: Dartmouth College; Stanford University
- Scientific career
- Fields: Urogynecology, reproductive surgery
- Workplaces: University of California, San Francisco; Stanford University

Leslee L. Subak is an American urogynecologist and reproductive surgeon. She is the Katharine Dexter McCormick and Stanley McCormick Memorial Professor and chair of the department of obstetrics and gynecology at Stanford University School of Medicine.

== Life ==
Subak earned a B.A. in geology and earth science from Dartmouth College in 1983. She completed premedical coursework at the University of Pennsylvania from 1984 to 1985. In 1991, she earned a M.D. from the Stanford University School of Medicine. From 1991 to 1997, Subak conducted a gynecological residency, epidemiological and research methods fellowship, and clinical fellowship in pelvic surgery and urogynecology at the University of California, San Francisco and San Francisco VA Medical Center.

Subak's researches lower urinary tract function and urinary incontinence in women. In 1997, Subak joined the departments of obstetrics, gynecology and reproductive sciences and epidemiology and biostatistics at the University of California, San Francisco as a clinical instructor. She was promoted to assistant professor in 1998, associate professor in 2004, professor in 2009. In 2017, Subak joined the department of obstetrics and gynecology and by courtesy of urology at Stanford University School of Medicine. She is the chair and Katharine Dexter McCormick and Stanley McCormick Memorial Professor. She succeeded Jonathan Berek.
