= Ian Duncan (oncologist) =

British gynaecological oncologist

- Born: 1943 (age 82–83)
- Education: University of St Andrews
- Occupation: Gynaecological oncologist
- Employer: University of Dundee

Dr Ian Duncan FRCOG, FHEA (born 1943) is a British gynaecological oncologist.

Duncan studied medicine at the University of St Andrews and undertook trained in obstetrics and gynaecology at Dundee from 1969 to 1978, broken by period at Duke University from 1972 to 1974, specializing in gynaecological oncology.

In 1978 he obtained a position as senior lecturer at the University of Dundee, rising to be reader and honorary consultant gynaecologist and oncologist. He retired from there in 2007.

He served as president of the British Society for Colposcopy and Cervical Pathology until 1988; as president of the British Gynaecological Cancer Society from 1988 to 1991; as chair of the International Federation for Cervical Pathology and Colposcopy from 1993 to 1996; and as chair of the Scottish Cervical Screening Programme national advisory group from 1998 to 2003.

He is a Fellow of the Royal College of Obstetricians and Gynaecologists (FRCOG) and a Fellow of the Higher Education Academy (FHEA); and gave the 5th Annual Oration of the Society for Colonoscopy and Cervical Pathology of Singapore in 1998, titled "Setting Guidelines for Cervical Screening".
