= Beth Karlan =

American gynecologic oncologist

- Born: New York City, New York, US
- Spouse: Scott R. Karlan

Academic background
- Education: BA, Biochemical Sciences, 1978, Radcliffe College; MD, 1982, Harvard Medical School and Harvard-M.I.T. Program in Health Sciences and Technology

Academic work
- Institutions: David Geffen School of Medicine at UCLA; Cedars-Sinai Medical Center
- Main interests: Gynecologic Cancers and Inherited Cancer Risk

Beth Young Karlan is an American gynecologic oncologist. In 2008, she was named editor-in-chief of the medical journals Gynecologic Oncology and Gynecologic Oncology Reports. In 2012, Karlan was appointed by the White House to serve on the National Cancer Advisory Board, and in 2015, she was elected to the National Academy of Medicine.

Karlan is best known for her clinical efforts in identifying, treating, and preventing ovarian cancer, and her research focuses on inherited cancer risk, specifically cancers related to BRCA1/2 mutations. Her research has identified subtype-specific biomarkers for early detection, prognostication, and personalized therapies in gynecologic malignancies.

== Early life and education ==
Karlan was born in New York City, New York, USA. She was interested in medicine at a young age and worked in a cancer research lab at her local hospital as a teenager. While Karlan was discouraged from applying to Harvard University's Radcliffe College by her high school guidance counselor, she became the first person from the school to attend the institution. After graduating in 1978, she was accepted into Harvard Medical School. Upon graduating with her medical degree, Karlan completed her residency in obstetrics and gynecology at Yale New Haven Hospital, a research fellowship in molecular biology at Yale Medical School, and her clinical fellowship in gynecologic oncology at the David Geffen School of Medicine at UCLA.

== Career ==
After completing her education and training, Karlan joined the David Geffen School of Medicine at UCLA in the Department of Obstetrics and Gynecology and Cedars-Sinai Medical Center as their Director of Gynecologic Oncology Research. In 1995, she was named the inaugural recipient of the Cedars-Sinai Board of Governors endowed chair in Gynecologic Oncology and in 1998 she received the Women's Cancers Research Award for her work in ovarian cancer. In these roles, Karlan focused on "unraveling the genetic underpinnings that drive the growth of ovarian cancer" with a specific focus towards finding clinically actionable targets. She co-authored Molecular signatures of ovarian cancer: from detection to prognosis which identified subtyped-specific biomarkers for early detection, prognostication and personalized therapies. Karlan chaired the Department of Defense’s Ovarian Cancer Research Program’s Integration Panel in 2002, after years of service on the panel helping to direct federal support to the promising research. She later testified before the United States House of Representatives Defense Appropriations Subcommittee to advocate for continued support for the Department of Defense’s Congressionally Directed Medical Research Programs.

Karlan’s interest in ovarian cancer early detection led to the discovery of a novel biomarker HE4 to help triage women with a pelvic mass and to help monitor women with ovarian cancer for possible recurrence. She collaborated with professors at the University of Toronto so study how often the BRCA1 gene was abnormal in women of Ashkenazi descent who had already developed ovarian cancer. In 2002, Karlan co-published Cancer incidence in a population of Jewish women at risk of ovarian cancer and later became the principal investigator for BRCA Founder Outreach Study (BFOR), to develop a new model to increase access to BRCA genetic testing.

Beyond UCLA, Karlan has also been active in advocacy for women’s health, testifying before the US Congress to help to spearhead the passage of the "Gynecologic Cancer Education and Awareness Act of 2005," which was signed into law by President George W. Bush. In 2006, Karlan was named an American Cancer Society Early Detection Clinical Research Professor. After being promoted to director of the Cedars-Sinai Women's Cancer Research Institute at the Samuel Oschin Comprehensive Cancer Institute, Karlan was appointed editor-in-chief of the Society of Gynecologic Oncology medical journal in 2008. Following this, she was also appointed to serve on the Board of Directors of IRIS International, Inc. During the presidency of Barack Obama, Karlan was appointed to serve on the National Cancer Advisory Board, a committee that advises the National Cancer Institute (NCI). She was also recognized by Los Angeles Magazine as one of their "Ten Women Leaders Who Impact LA." The following year, Karlan was recognized by Angelina Jolie after she treated the actress' mother.

As a result of her scientific research, Karlan was selected as the 2015 recipient of the Claudia Cohen Research Foundation Prize for Outstanding Gynecologic Researcher. She was later the recipient of the Rosalind Franklin Excellence in Ovarian Cancer Research Award from the Ovarian Cancer Research Alliance and elected to the Board of the Harvard Board of Overseers for a six year term. At the start of the 2015–16 academic year, Karlan was elected to the National Academy of Medicine and was later honored as a Giant of Science by the American Cancer Society.

In 2018, Karlan was named a Fellow of the American Society of Clinical Oncology (ASCO) "in recognition of her dedication to volunteer efforts that benefit ASCO, the specialty of oncology and the patients ASCO serves." In 2019 she was named Vice Chair of Women’s Health Research in the Department of Obstetrics and Gynecology at the UCLA David Geffen School of Medicine, and appointed chair of Ovarian Cancer Research Alliance's Scientific Advisory Committee. Her work in advancing cancer treatment, diagnosis and research was also recognized by OncLive by being inducted into their 2019 class of Giants of Cancer Care in gynecologic malignancies. During the COVID-19 pandemic, Karlan elected vice-chair of the Harvard Board of Overseers executive committee for the final year of her six-year term. She also oversaw clinical trials at UCLA to better understand the impact and outcomes of COVID-19 in people undergoing cancer treatment. In 2021, Los Angeles Business Journal named Karlan to their Los Angeles' Top Doctors List, and she was recognized in Rome, Italy by the International Gynecologic Cancer Society with their Lifetime Achievement Award.

== Personal life ==
Karlan is married to Scott R. Karlan, a general surgeon at Cedars-Sinai Medical Center, and they have two children together, Matthew and Jocelyn.
