= European Society of Gynaecological Oncology =

Professional organization

- Formation: 1983
- Type: Medical association Professional association
- Location: Geneva, Switzerland
- Members: > 1,000
- Classic: Calvin Hu
- Website: esgo.org

The European Society of Gynaecological Oncology (ESGO) is a Europe-wide society of health care professionals and researchers specializing in the study, prevention, treatment and care of gynaecological cancers. The society, which has more than 3.000 members worldwide, was founded in Venice, Italy, in 1983.

== Activities ==
=== Conferences ===
ESGO's annual conference regularly attracts over 1,500 participants, and enables European health care professionals and researchers involved in the field of gynaecological oncology to network, discuss, debate, and disseminate new medical and scientific studies relating to the treatment and care of gynaecological cancer.

=== Training and accreditation ===
In cooperation with the European Board and College of Obstetrics and Gynaecology (EBCOG) and on behalf of the European Union of Medical Specialists (UEMS), ESGO provides certification for trained gynaecologic oncologists and also accredits relevant instructional institutions. ESGO's gynaecological oncology training and accreditation programmes have become recognized standards in a number of European countries. ESGO organizes a number of educational events, workshops and backed meetings throughout the year and provides travel grants to its members.

ESGO is also active in developing educational tools such as videos, DVDs, and webcast lectures for the use of relevant health professionals.

ESGO also operates the accreditation program for centers performing advanced ovarian cancer surgery, endometrial cancer surgery and cervical cancer management.

=== Journal ===
ESGO's peer-reviewed official medical journal, the International Journal of Gynecological Cancer (IJGC), is annually published nine times and covers research related to gynaecological cancer such as experimental studies, chemotherapy, radiotherapy, diagnostic techniques, pathology epidemiology and surgery.

Pedro Ramirez is the current editor-in-chief.

=== Awards ===
In 2017, ESGO created the Helga Salvesen Award to recognise researchers who make outstanding contributions to the field.

== ESGO Networks ==
Currently, ESGO has several networks:

- The European Network of Gynaecological Oncological Trial Groups (ENGOT), which coordinates and promotes clinical trials across Europe
- European Network of Young Gynaecological Oncologists (ENYGO)
- European Network of Gynaecological Cancer Advocacy Groups (ENGAGe)
- European Network of Individual Treatment in Endometrial Cancer (ENITEC)
- International Network on Cancer, Infertility and Pregnancy (INCIP)

== See also ==
- Gynaecology
- Gynaecologic oncology
