= Mucin-16 =

Mammalian protein found in Homo sapiens

MUC16
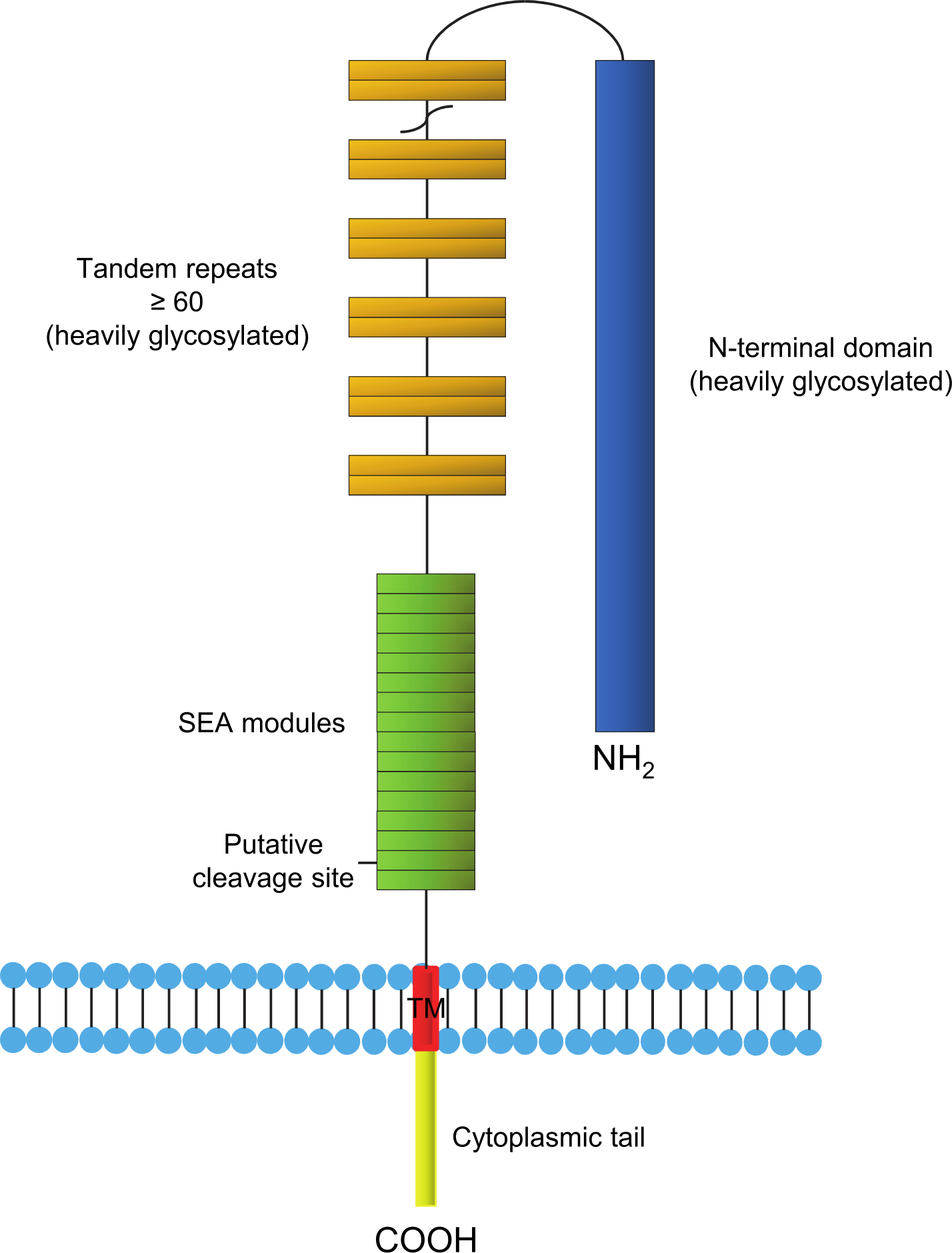

Identifiers
- Aliases: MUC16, CA125, mucin 16, cell surface associated
- External IDs: OMIM: 606154; GeneCards: MUC16

Gene location (Human)
Chr.	Chromosome 19 (human)
Band	19p13.2	Start	8,848,844 bp
Band	19p13.2	End	8,981,342 bp
RNA expression pattern
Bgee	Human / Mouse (ortholog); Top expressed in: nasal epithelium; epithelium of bronchus; olfactory zone of nasal mucosa; bronchial epithelial cell; mucosa of paranasal sinus; palpebral conjunctiva; trachea; epithelium of nasopharynx; right uterine tube; minor salivary glands / n/a; More reference expression data
BioGPS	n/a
Gene ontology
Molecular function	protein binding
Cellular component	Golgi lumen; integral component of membrane; extracellular region; vesicle; extracellular exosome; membrane; extrinsic component of membrane; extracellular space; plasma membrane
Biological process	cell adhesion; O-glycan processing; stimulatory C-type lectin receptor signaling pathway
Sources:Amigo / QuickGO
Orthologs
Databases	NCBI: entry; OMA: entry
Species	Human	Mouse
Entrez	94025	n/a
Ensembl	ENSG00000181143	n/a
UniProt	Q8WXI7	n/a
RefSeq (mRNA)	NM_024690; NM_001401501	n/a
RefSeq (protein)	NP_078966	n/a
Location (UCSC)	Chr 19: 8.85 – 8.98 Mb	n/a
PubMed search		n/a
- Wikidata
View/Edit Human

Mucin-16 (MUC-16) also known as Ovarian cancer-related tumor marker CA125 is a protein that in humans is encoded by the MUC16 gene. MUC-16 is a member of the mucin family glycoproteins. MUC-16 has found application as a tumor marker or biomarker that may be elevated in the blood of some patients with specific types of cancers, most notably ovarian cancer, or other conditions that are benign.

== Structure ==
Mucin 16 is a membrane associated mucin that possesses a single transmembrane domain. A unique property of MUC16 is its large size. MUC16 is more than twice as long as MUC1 and MUC4 and contains about 22,000 amino acids, making it the largest membrane-associated mucin.

MUC16 is composed of three different domains:

- An N-terminal domain
- A tandem repeat domain
- A C-terminal domain

The N-terminal and tandem repeat domains are both entirely extracellular and highly O-glycosylated. All mucins contain a tandem repeat domain that has repeating amino acid sequences high in serine, threonine and proline. The C-terminal domain contains multiple extracellular SEA (sea urchin sperm protein, enterokinase, and agrin) modules, a transmembrane domain, and a cytoplasmic tail. The extracellular region of MUC16 can be released from the cell surface by undergoing proteolytic cleavage. MUC16 is thought to be cleaved at a site in the SEA modules.

== Function ==
MUC16 is a component of the ocular surface (including the cornea and conjunctiva), the respiratory tract and the female reproductive tract epithelia. Since MUC16 is highly glycosylated it creates a hydrophilic environment that acts as a lubricating barrier against foreign particles and infectious agents on the apical membrane of epithelial cells. Also, the cytoplasmic tail of MUC16 has been shown to interact with cytoskeleton by binding members of the ERM protein family. The expression of mucin 16 has been shown to be altered in dry eye, cystic fibrosis, and several types of cancers.

== Role in cancer ==
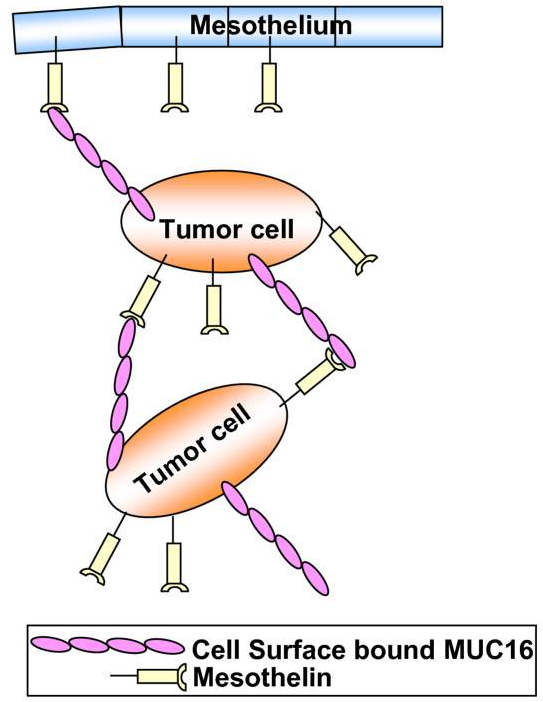
Tumor metastasis initiated by interactions between MUC16 and mesothelin.

MUC16 (CA-125) has been shown to play a role in advancing tumorigenesis and tumor proliferation by several different mechanisms.

=== As a biomarker ===
Testing of CA-125 blood levels has been proposed as useful in treating ovarian cancer. While the test can give useful information for women already known to have ovarian cancer, CA-125 testing has not been found useful as a screening method because of the uncertain correlation between CA-125 levels and cancer. In addition to ovarian cancer, CA-125 can be elevated in patients who have conditions such as endometrial cancer, fallopian tube cancer, lung cancer, breast cancer, and gastrointestinal cancer. It can also be increased in pregnant women. Because of the wide variety of conditions that can increase serum levels, CA-125 is not used to detect cancer, but it is often used to monitor responses to chemotherapy, relapse, and disease progression in ovarian cancer patients.

=== Metastatic invasion ===
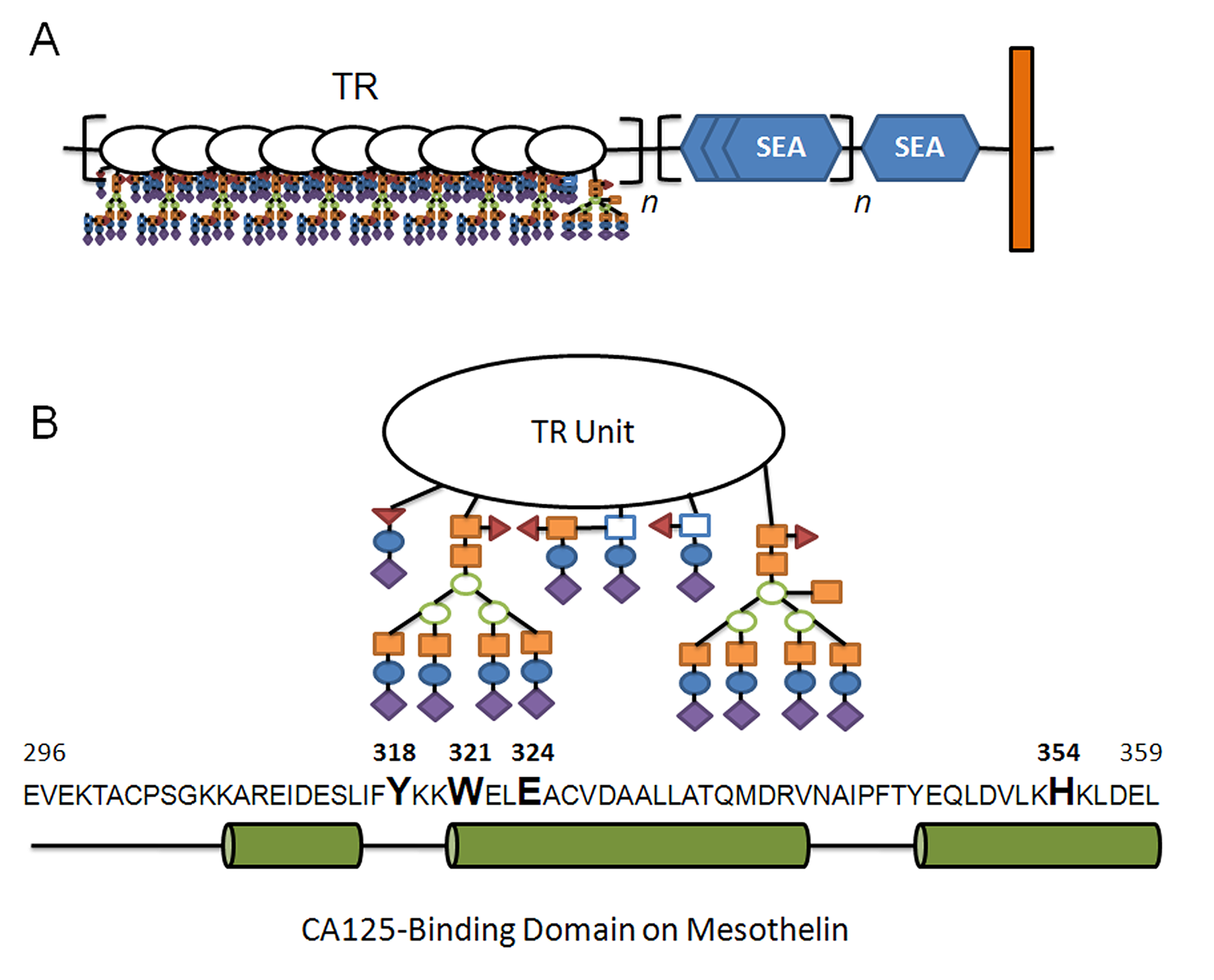
Interaction of MUC16 (CA125) and mesothelin

MUC16 is also thought to participate in cell-to-cell interactions that enable the metastasis of tumor cells. This is supported by evidence showing that MUC16 binds selectively to mesothelin, a glycoprotein normally expressed by the mesothelial cells of the peritoneum (the lining of the abdominal cavity). MUC16 and mesothelin interactions are thought to provide the first step in tumor cell invasion of the peritoneum. The region (residues 296–359) consisting of 64 amino acids at the N-terminus of cell surface mesothelin has been experimentally established as the functional binding domain (named IAB) for MUC16/CA125. An immunoadhesin (HN125) that consists of the IAB domain of mesothelin and the human Fc portion has the ability to disrupt the heterotypic cancer cell adhesion mediated by the MUC16-mesothelin interaction.

Mesothelin has also been found to be expressed in several types of cancers including mesothelioma, ovarian cancer and squamous cell carcinoma. Since mesothelin is also expressed by tumor cells, MUC16 and mesothelial interactions may aid in the gathering of other tumor cells to the location of a metastasis, thus increasing the size of the metastasis.

=== Induced motility ===
Evidence suggests that expression of the cytoplasmic tail of MUC16 enables tumor cells to grow, promotes cell motility and may facilitate invasion. This appears to be due to the ability of the C-terminal domain of MUC16 to facilitate signaling that leads to a decrease in the expression of E-cadherin and increase the expression of N-cadherin and vimentin, which are expression patterns consistent with epithelial-mesenchymal transition.

=== Chemotherapy resistance ===
MUC16 may also play a role in reducing the sensitivity of cancer cells to drug therapy. For example, overexpression of MUC16 has been shown to protect cells from the effects of genotoxic drugs, such as cisplatin.

== Discovery ==
CA-125 was initially detected using the murine monoclonal antibody designated OC125. Robert Bast, Robert Knapp and their research team first isolated this monoclonal antibody in 1981. The protein was named "cancer antigen 125" because OC125 was the 125th antibody produced against the ovarian cancer cell line that was being studied.
