= Gynecologic Oncology Group =

Non-profit organization

- Abbreviation: GOG
- Formation: 1970; 56 years ago
- Type: Nonprofit organization
- Headquarters: Philadelphia, Pennsylvania
- Website: www.gog.org

The Gynecologic Oncology Group (GOG) is a nonprofit organization funded by the National Cancer Institute to support research on the prevention and treatment of gynecologic cancers, including ovarian cancer, cervical cancer, endometrial cancer, vulvar cancer, and vaginal cancer.

== History ==
The GOG was founded in 1970 and housed under the American College of Obstetricians and Gynecologists.

The formation of the GOG was the result of the recognition of the need for collaborative research in the gynecologic malignancies. The GOG has now grown to include over 50 research centers and has over 160 affiliated institutions. Its members make up a multi-disciplinary group, consisting of gynecologic oncologists, medical oncologists, pathologists, radiation oncologists, nurses, statisticians, and basic scientists.

Over 3,000 patients are treated each year on GOG protocols. As of 2024, the GOG has completed over 350 clinical trials.
