= Fremont High School (Michigan) =

- U.S. National Register of Historic Places
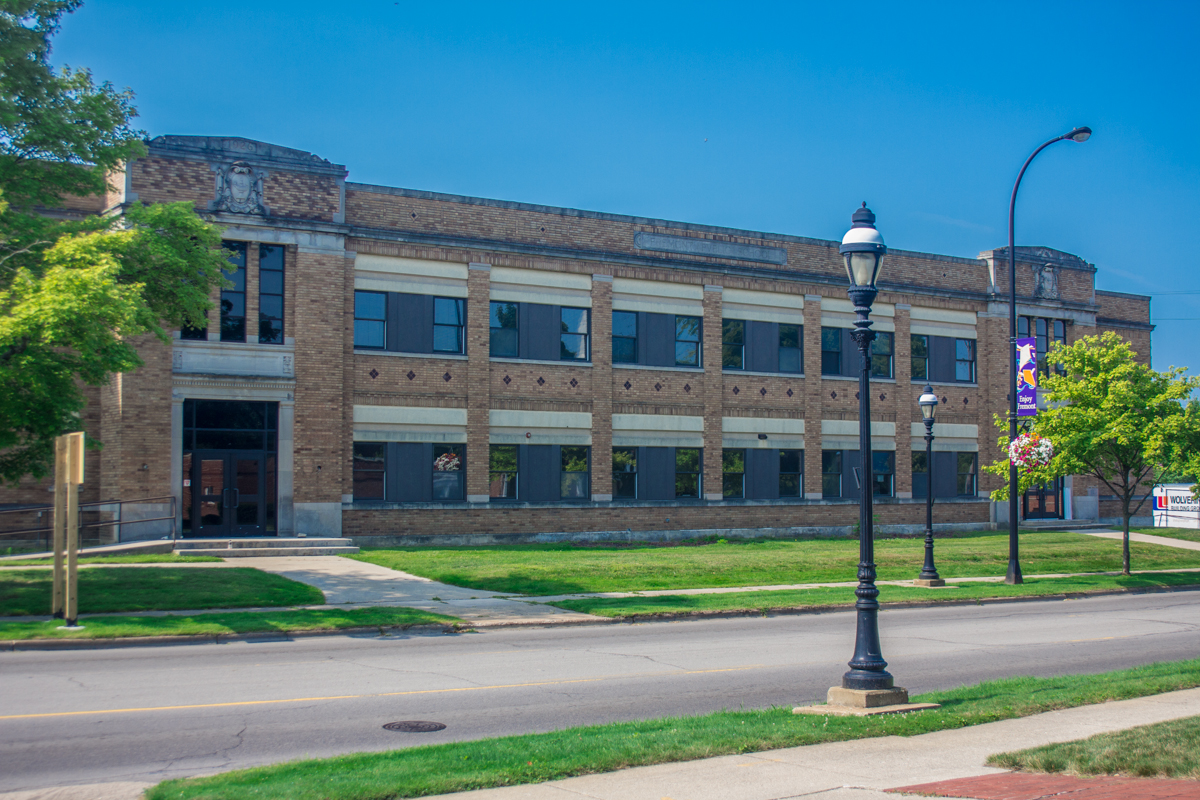

- Location within Michigan Location within the United States
- Interactive map
- Location: 204 E. Main, Fremont, Michigan
- Coordinates: 43°28′0″N 85°56′27″W
- Area: 5 acres (2.0 ha)
- Built: 1926
- Architect: Judson N. Churchill, Warren S. Holmes Co.
- Architectural style: Arts and Crafts, International Style
- NRHP reference No.: 13000669
- Added to NRHP: September 4, 2013

The former Fremont High School is a former school building located at 204 East Main Street in Fremont, Michigan. It was listed on the National Register of Historic Places in 2013.

== History ==
The Fremont school system was established in the 1850s with the construction of a plank school in the center of town. This soon proved inadequate, and another school was established between Fremont and nearby Elm Corners in 1865. In 1876, Fremont built a brick school at the site of the present structure, and enlarged it in 1888. This structure was soon dedicated to the high school classes, with the primary school moved to a different location.

At the start of the 20th century, the school faced serious overcrowding, and an annex was added in 1909. Still, by 1925, the increase in students and the deterioration of the high school building led the school district to approve a bond measure in late 1925. The bond issue raised $200,000, and the district hired Lansing architect Judson N. Churchill, who specialized in educational buildings, to design a new high school. Construction began in 1926, and students moved into the new facilities in February 1927. The new school incorporated the 1909 addition from the earlier building; the remainder of the earlier building was demolished.

An addition housing the manual arts classes and a bus garage was constructed in 1946, and a second addition for the shop and music facilities was constructed in 1955. In 1961, a new athletic facility, not connected to the 1926 high school, was constructed one block south. The school district hired the Lansing firm of Warren S. Holmes Company to design the building. In 1984, the old 1909 addition was demolished; in 1988 the original courtyard was filled in with a new structure, and the 1961 athletic facility was connected to the 1926 building.

By 2009, the district had decided that a new school was necessary. They began work on a new high school building to the south of town, and students moved to that facility in fall of 2012. As of 2013, the previous high school building was vacant, and plans were in the works to renovate the school into senior citizen housing and a community recreation facility.

== Description ==
The former Fremont High School consists of three distinct sections. The first is the original two-story yellow and tan brick Arts and Crafts-inspired 1926 school building. The second is the one- and two- story red brick 1961 International Style gymnasium. The third is the one- and two- story red and tan brick 1988 connector between the two earlier buildings.

=== 1926 building ===
The 1926 high school building is a two-story rectangular structure built of yellow and tan brick with limestone and decorative brick detailing and a flat roof. The building is Arts and Crafts-inspired with Classical Revival features. The main north façade has a projecting central portion flanked by two entry towers; a third tower is on the west side. The windows are separated by brick pilasters; the original nine-over-nine double-hung wooden windows have been replaced with one-over-one aluminum double-hung windows. The original building courtyard has been built in; the original gymnasium was renovated in 1961 to add classrooms to both floors.

=== 1961 building ===
The 1961 gymnasium/natatorium building is a low red brick International Style building with a long flat roof. The gymnasium and natatorium are both two stories in height, while the remaining portions of the building are one story. The building generally lacks exterior ornamentation, save for brick pilasters lining the gymnasium wall.

=== 1988 building ===
The 1988 portion of the building links the rear of the 1927 building to the rear of the 1961 building. It is constructed of tan and red brick, intended to harmonize with the earlier portions of the school. It has a flat roof and a covered entryway, and paired tall, narrow aluminum and glass windows.
