= Robert C. Bast Jr. =

American physician-scientist

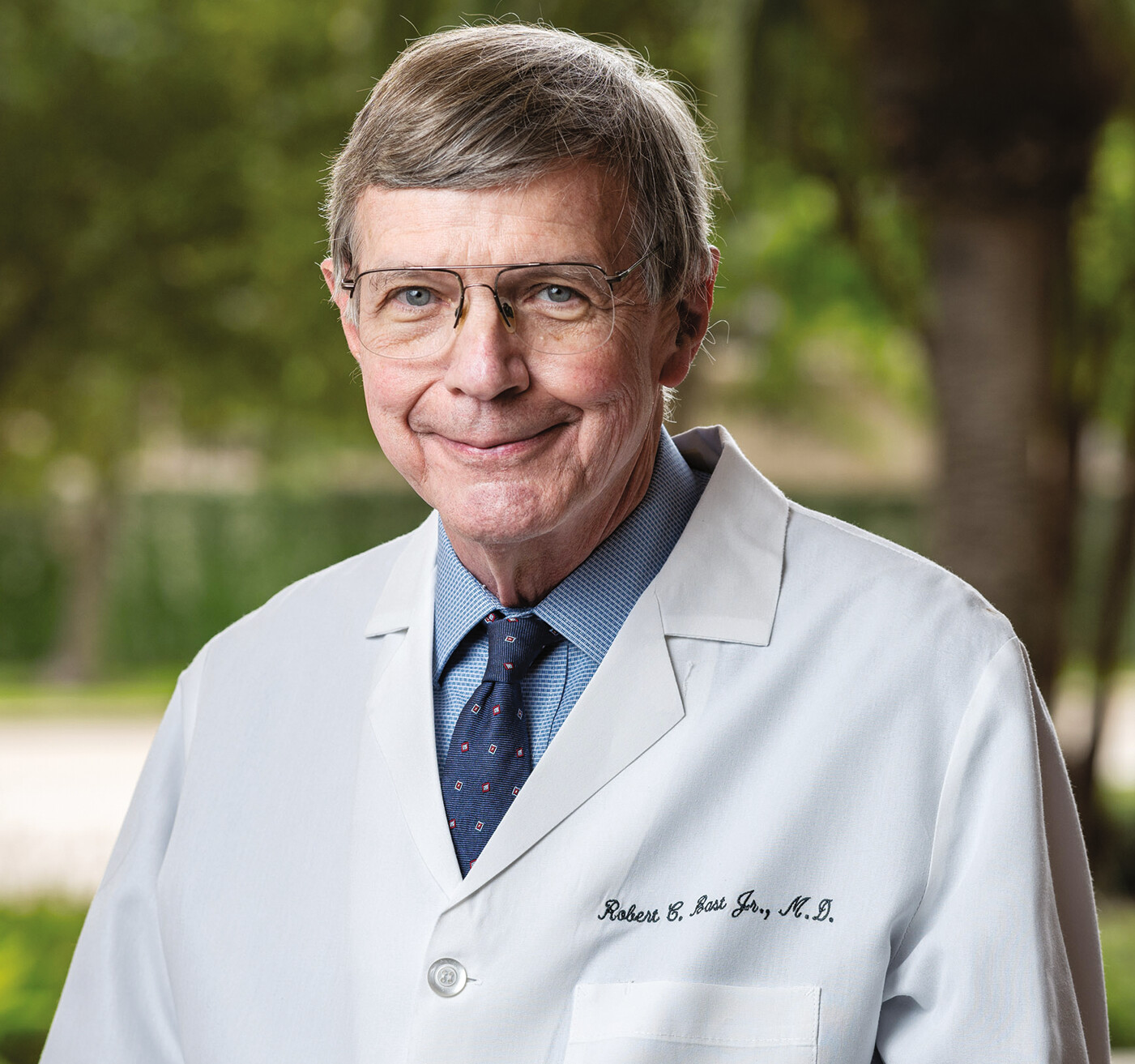
- Born: Robert Clinton Bast Jr. December 8, 1943 (age 82)
- Education: Wesleyan University (B.A.), Harvard Medical School (M.D.)
- Known for: Discovery of CA-125 ovarian cancer biomarker
- Awards: AACR Daniel D. Von Hoff Award (2025); Fellow of the AAAS (2002) and ASCO (2017); Rosalind Franklin Award (2008)
- Scientific career
- Fields: Oncology, Translational medicine, Cancer biomarkers
- Workplaces: University of Texas MD Anderson Cancer Center; formerly Dana–Farber Cancer Institute, Harvard Medical School, and Duke University Medical Center

Robert Clinton Bast Jr., (born December 8, 1943) is an American physician-scientist who is the Director of Translational Research Career Development at University of Texas MD Anderson Cancer Center and holder of the Harry Carrothers Wiess Distinguished University Chair. Bast is best known for the discovery of CA125, a serum biomarker for ovarian cancer that has contributed to the care of ovarian cancer patients worldwide. His research spans early detection, enhancing chemotherapy and understanding regulation of dormancy and the role of autophagy in breast and ovarian cancer.

== Early life and education ==
Bast was born in Washington, D.C. He received his B.A. in biology, cum laude, from Wesleyan University in 1965 and his M.D., magna cum laude, from Harvard Medical School in 1971. During medical school, he conducted research on cellular immunology with Harold Dvorak at Massachusetts General Hospital.

== Career ==
Following his internship in internal medicine at Johns Hopkins Hospital, Bast joined the U.S. Public Health Service and became a research associate at the National Cancer Institute (NCI), where he studied BCG immunotherapy and carcinogen metabolism. He completed medical residency at Brigham and Women's Hospital and fellowship in medical oncology at the Dana–Farber Cancer Institute, joining the faculty of Harvard Medical School in 1977 and becoming an Associate Professor in 1983.

In 1984, Bast moved to Duke University Medical Center as Professor of Medicine and Co-Director of Hematology-Oncology. He led the Duke Comprehensive Cancer Center as Director from 1987 to 1994 and was named the Wellcome Clinical Professor of Medicine in 1992.

Since joining MD Anderson Cancer Center, Bast has held several leadership roles, including Head of the Division of Medicine (1994-2000) and Vice President for Translational Research (2000–2022). He continues to serve as Professor in the Department of Experimental Therapeutics.

== Research ==
Bast’s most widely recognized contribution is the discovery of CA125 (MUC16), a tumor-associated antigen used as a biomarker for ovarian cancer. Collaborating with Robert Knapp at the Dana Farber Cancer Institute, Bast had developed the first monoclonal antibodies directed against human ovarian cancer and the 125th promising hybridoma recognized CA125. Initially introduced for monitoring disease persistence, progression and recurrence, CA125 is also used to distinguish malignant from benign pelvic masses and has contributed to trials for early detection. Combining rising CA125 and ultrasound has achieved adequate specificity and detected 70% of cases in early stage. Beyond CA125, Bast’s lab has identified 3 additional biomarkers from >130 candidates that detect cases missed by CA125 and that are being evaluated in the first 4-biomarker screening trial for ovarian cancer.

Bast’s group has also made key discoveries in tumor biology. Having first demonstrated that epithelial ovarian cancer is clonal in origin, they discovered DIRAS3 (ARHI), an imprinted tumor suppressor gene downregulated in many cancers whose re-expression induces dormancy as well as autophagy which sustains dormant cancer cells in a nutrient poor environment. DIRAS3 is also an endogenous pan-suppressor of RAS that binds directly to the oncogene, disrupting dimers, clusters and downstream signaling. Salt induced kinase 2 (SIK2) was found to be required for several cancer cell functions and its inhibition enhances the activity of the chemotherapeutic drugs and PARP inhibitors used to treat ovarian cancer.

Bast has authored over 750 peer-reviewed publications, chapters, editorials and commentaries and served as editor-in-chief of major oncology texts, including Holland-Frei Cancer Medicine.

== Honors and recognition ==
Bast is a Fellow of the American College of Physicians, the American Association for the Advancement of Science, and the American Society of Clinical Oncology. He is an elected member of the Association of American Physicians and the American Society for Clinical Investigation. His recognitions include:

- AACR Daniel von Hoff Award
- Giants of Cancer Care Award
- Champion and Changemaker of Cancer Prevention, Early Detection and Symptom Science, NCI 50th Anniversary of the National Cancer Act
- Ovarcome Pioneer Award
- Society of Gynecologic Oncology Innovator Award
- Claudia Cohen Award (Gynecologic Cancer Foundation)
- Rosalind Franklin Award (Ovarian Cancer National Alliance)
- Award for Excellence (International Gynecologic Cancer Society)
- Lemaistre Outstanding Achievement Award (M.D. Anderson)
- Henry Asbury Christian Award (Harvard Medical School)

Bast has also been consistently recognized in Best Doctors in America and America’s Top Doctors.

== Selected publications ==
- Bast RC, Jr; Zbar, B; Borsos, T; Rapp, HJ (20 June 1974). "BCG and cancer (first of two parts)". The New England Journal of Medicine. 290 (25): 1413–20. doi:10.1056/NEJM197406202902506. PMID 4364286.
- Bast RC, Jr; Whitlock JP, Jr; Miller, H; Rapp, HJ; Gelboin, HV (23 August 1974). "Aryl hydrocarbon (benzo(a)pyrene) hydroxylase in human peripheral blood monocytes". Nature. 250 (5468): 664–5. Bibcode:1974Natur.250..664B. doi:10.1038/250664a0. PMID 4850643.
- Bast RC, Jr; Klug, TL; St John, E; Jenison, E; Niloff, JM; Lazarus, H; Berkowitz, RS; Leavitt, T; Griffiths, CT; Parker, L; Zurawski VR, Jr; Knapp, RC (13 October 1983). "A radioimmunoassay using a monoclonal antibody to monitor the course of epithelial ovarian cancer". The New England Journal of Medicine. 309 (15): 883–7. doi:10.1056/NEJM198310133091503. PMID 6310399.
- Ahmed, Ahmed Ashour; Lu, Zhen; Jennings, Nicholas B.; Etemadmoghadam, Dariush; Capalbo, Luisa; Jacamo, Rodrigo O.; Barbosa-Morais, Nuno; Le, Xiao-Feng; Australian Ovarian Cancer Study Group; Vivas-Mejia, Pablo; Lopez-Berestein, Gabriel; Grandjean, Geoffrey; Bartholomeusz, Geoffrey; Liao, Warren; Andreeff, Michael (2010-08-09). "SIK2 is a centrosome kinase required for bipolar mitotic spindle formation that provides a potential target for therapy in ovarian cancer". Cancer Cell. 18 (2): 109–121. doi:10.1016/j.ccr.2010.06.018. ISSN:1878-3686. PMC:3954541. PMID:20708153.
- Han, Chae Young; Lu, Karen H.; Corrigan, Gwen; Perez, Alexandra; Kohring, Sharlene D.; Celestino, Joseph; Bedi, Deepak; Bedia, Enrique; Bevers, Therese; Boruta, David; Carlson, Matthew; Holman, Laura; Leeds, Leroy; Mathews, Cara; McCann, Georgia (2024-04-01). "Normal Risk Ovarian Screening Study: 21-Year Update". Journal of Clinical Oncology: Official Journal of the American Society of Clinical Oncology. 42 (10): 1102–1109. doi:10.1200/JCO.23.00141. ISSN:1527-7755. PMC:11003507. PMID:38194613.
