= Stanford Cancer Institute =

The Stanford Cancer Institute is an NCI-designated Cancer Center at Stanford University in Palo Alto, CA. It is one of eight comprehensive cancer centers in California. The Stanford Cancer Institute leverages the scientific, technological, and human resources of Stanford University and Stanford Health Care to enhance the understanding of cancer. It facilitates the translation of research discoveries into improved prevention strategies, diagnostic methods, and more effective and safer therapies. The Stanford Cancer Institute has more than 300 faculty members within the Stanford network. Adult patients are treated at the Stanford Cancer Center.

== History ==
Early breakthroughs (1950s–1990s)

Although the Stanford Cancer Institute was not formally established as a unified entity until the 21st century, Stanford University has a legacy of oncological innovation dating back to the 1950s. In 1956, radiologist Henry Kaplan and physicist Edward Ginzton developed the first medical linear accelerator in the Western Hemisphere, using it to treat a two-year-old boy with retinoblastoma. This technology revolutionized radiation therapy globally. In the 1960s, Kaplan and Saul Rosenberg pioneered "combined modality therapy"—the strategic use of chemotherapy and radiation—which significantly increased survival rates for Hodgkin's disease. Other major research milestones during this period included:

- 1970: Leonard Herzenberg developed the fluorescence-activated cell sorter (FACS), a tool critical for isolating and studying cancer cells.
- 1981: Ronald Levy conducted the first successful treatment of a cancer patient using monoclonal antibodies.
- 1988: Irving Weissman isolated pure blood-forming stem cells in mice, a discovery that laid the groundwork for modern stem cell transplants and regenerative medicine.

Foundation and National Cancer Institute designation (2004–2015)

Stanford University was a founding member of the National Comprehensive Cancer Network in 1995. The Stanford Cancer Institute was founded in 2004. The goal was to improve the understanding of cancer by creating a multidisciplinary community of physicians and scientists. The center was established to bridge the gap between basic laboratory science and clinical patient care. Irving Weissman, MD, a leading expert in the field of cancer stem cell biology, served as the institute’s inaugural director. In 2007, the Stanford Cancer Institute received an initial designation from the National Cancer Institute as an NCI-designated Cancer Center. This status provided federal funding and recognized Stanford's excellence in clinical and basic research. In 2008, Beverly Mitchell, MD, was appointed director, a role she held for a decade during a period of rapid faculty recruitment and expansion in population science.

Comprehensive status and recent years (2016–present)

The Stanford Cancer Institute’s designation was elevated to an NCI-designated Comprehensive Cancer Center in 2016. This recognized the institute’s depth in laboratory, clinical, and population-based research, as well as its community outreach efforts across Northern California. In 2018, Steven Artandi, MD, PhD, was named director. The comprehensive designation was subsequently renewed in 2022. As part of the NCI redesignation, the Institute received a multi-year Cancer Center Support Grant to support its six research programs: cancer cell biology, cancer imaging and early detection, cancer immunotherapy, cancer therapeutics, population sciences, and radiation biology.

== Timeline ==
- 2004: The Stanford Cancer Institute is founded to advance the understanding of cancer through a multidisciplinary, integrated, and collaborative community of physicians and scientists. Irving Weissman serves as the Institute’s inaugural director.
- 2007: The Stanford Cancer Institute receives its initial National Cancer Institute Cancer Center designation.
- 2008: Beverly Mitchel is named as director of the Stanford Cancer Institute. She replaces outgoing director Weissman.
- 2013: Stanford Cancer Institute Innovation Awards is founded to support Stanford cancer projects that hold significant promise in innovating cancer science and treatment.
- 2016: The Stanford Cancer Institute receives its National Cancer Institute Comprehensive Cancer Center designation.
- 2018: Steve Artandi is named as director of the Stanford Cancer Institute. He replaces outgoing director Mitchell.
- 2022: The Stanford Cancer Institute receives its National Cancer Institute Comprehensive Cancer Center designation renewal.
