= Gynecologic cancer disparities in the United States =

Gynecologic cancer disparities in the United States refer to differences in incidence, prevalence, and mortality from gynecologic cancers between population groups. The five main types of gynecologic cancer include cervical cancer, ovarian cancer, endometrial cancer, vaginal cancer, and vulvar cancer. For patients with these and other gynecologic malignancies within the United States, disparities across the care continuum by socioeconomic status and racial/ethnic background have been previously identified and studied. The causes behind these disparities are multifaceted and a complex interplay of systemic differences in health as well as individual patient factors such as cultural, educational, and economic barriers.

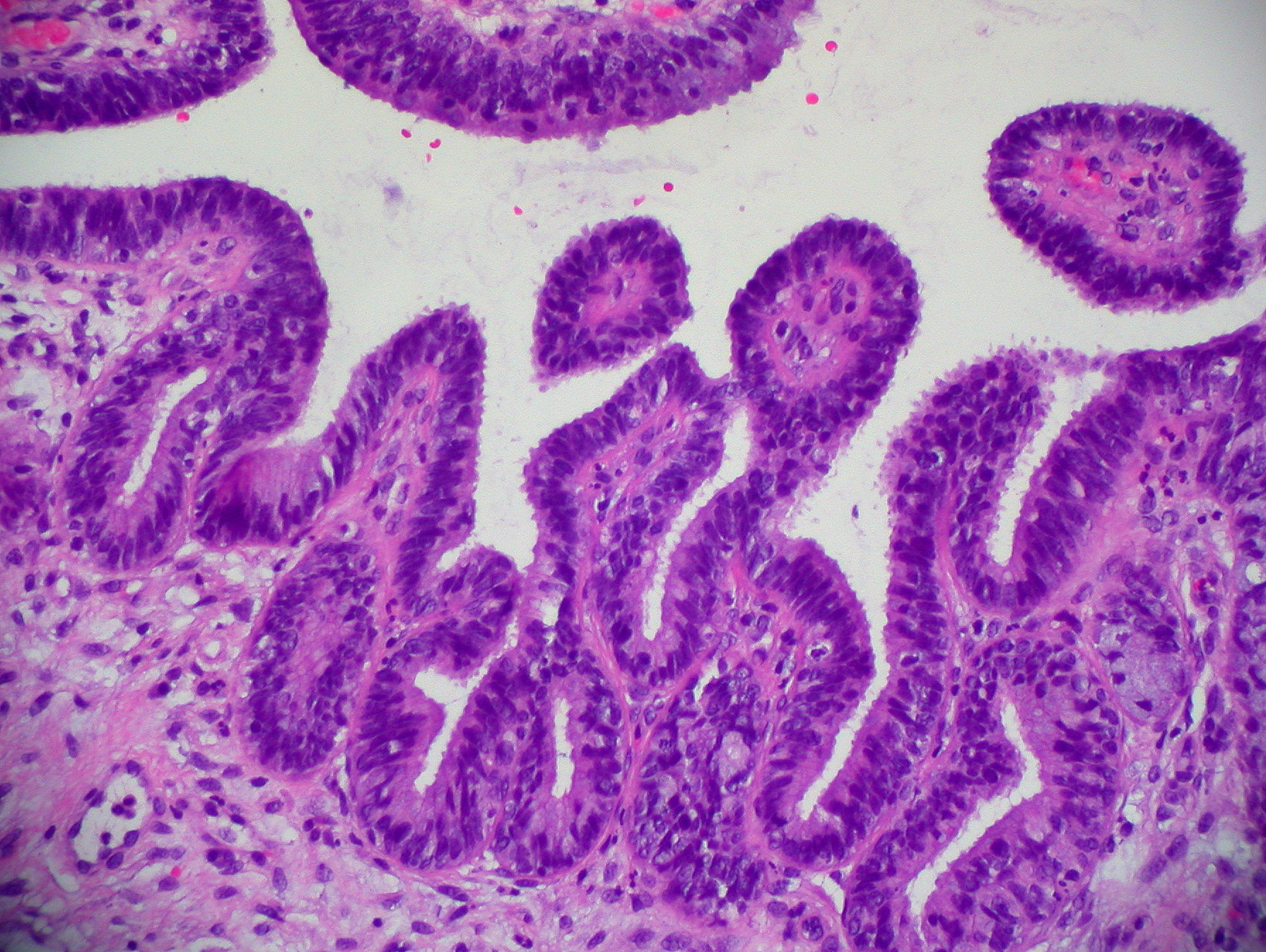
Cervix adenocarcinoma

== Cervical cancer disparities ==
Since the development of the Papanicolou smear or Pap smear in 1941, cervical cancer has been highly preventable. The implementation of Pap smear screening programs has resulted in a steady decline in incidence and mortality rates from cervical cancer since the mid-1970s. Even with this technology, the American Cancer Society still estimates that within the U.S., about 12,820 new cases of invasive cervical cancer will be diagnosed and 4,210 women will die of cervical cancer by the end of 2017.

Despite an overall decline in incidence and mortality rates from cervical cancer for women across the United States, significant disparities have been documented amongst racial and ethnic minorities and socioeconomically marginalized populations. Within the United States, Hispanic women have the highest incidence of cervical cancer, and African Americans have the highest mortality.

=== Differences in screening practices ===
Disparities amongst different minority groups have been attributed to different Pap smear screening practices. African Americans, American Indians, and non-white Hispanics have been found to be diagnosed at later stages than white women, which has been suggested as a potential contributing reason for their worse survival outcomes. One 2001 study in California found that Asian women were the least likely ethnic/racial group to have ever had a Pap test. This study also described varied trends existing within different Asian American subpopulations, identifying how Vietnamese women had the lowest screening rates (62.3%) and Filipino women had the highest screening rates (81.1%). It has also been discovered that foreign-born women in the U.S. have lower screening rates than those born in the U.S.

Not only does there exist disparity in screening, but there also exists post-screening disparities in follow-up practices. Adherence to follow-up after abnormal Pap tests varies across minority groups. The National Breast and Cervical Cancer Early Detection Program, a national initiative focused on increasing access to cervical and breast cancer screening for underserved women followed more than 10,000 participants who had two or more abnormal Pap test results. They found 56% of these patients did not follow-up with a recommended cervical examination, and 27.7% of this group received no follow-up examination whatsoever. Within this study, African Americans had the highest rate of no follow-up.

Across all racial/ethnic groups in the U.S., increased poverty and decreased education levels have been associated with higher mortality.

=== Differences in vaccination ===
Human papilloma virus (HPV) is consistently present in almost all cervical cancer cases across the world and is the main etiologic factor in cervical cancer. The U.S. Advisory Committee on Immunization Practice advises that females receive the full series of three doses of quadrivalent HPV vaccine at 11–12 years of age. For females aged 13–26 years who have not been previously vaccinated, catch-up vaccination is recommended.

Despite these national recommendations, the rate of HPV vaccination in the U.S. remains low. One study of 409 females aged 13–26 found that only 5% of participants had received one or more HPV vaccine dosages. Since parents have a critical role in deciding the vaccination of their young daughters, studies have found that parenting beliefs and attitudes are important to HPV vaccine practices of girls throughout the U.S.

=== Barriers to prevention ===
==== Cultural/personal barriers ====
Non-adherence to screening and vaccination have been found to be influenced by cultural and personal beliefs and conditions. Interviews with females of ethnic minorities, specifically Chinese and Hispanics, have revealed that the implications of sexual activity that come with Pap smears impact females decisions to get screened. Some women revealed that they avoid screening to prevent others from thinking that they are sexually active or promiscuous due to embarrassment or concern about being discovered.

==== Socioeconomic and institutional barriers ====
Receiving a recommendation by one's physician is strongly correlated with patients seeking out to be screened by a Pap smear. Across different racial and ethnic groups, having a regular doctor increases the likelihood of a patient undergoing regular Pap smearing. Additional barriers such as long wait times, lack of transportation, inability to take off work, lack of family support or available child care options can often impact patients' abilities to seek out and receive appropriate preventative measures and treatment.

==== Lack of knowledge and awareness ====
Understanding cervical cancer and its link to human papillomavirus (HPV) is closely related to agreeing to undergo Pap smear screening or get vaccinated against HPV across population types. Cervical cancer patients who have never had a Pap test were more likely to have previously not been aware that they were capable of developing cervical cancer.

=== Differences in treatment ===
There have been documented racial and ethnic disparities in clinical treatment for cervical cancer. Research has shown that African Americans are more likely than whites to go untreated. They are also less likely to receive clinical staging or be treated with surgery or combined therapy. Black women have a higher risk of dying from cervical cancer by 50%.

== Ovarian cancer disparities ==
While ovarian cancer accounts for only 3% of cancers for women in the U.S., it is the fifth leading cause of cancer-related deaths for this population. This cancer is known as the "silent killer" and is disproportionately lethal because of lack of effective screening and early detection strategies resulting from the absence of disease-specific symptoms. If diagnosed in an early stage (stage I) while the tumor is confined to the ovaries, ovarian cancer is highly treatable with a five-year survival rate over 90%. However the majority of ovarian cancer patients are diagnosed with stage III and stage IV cancer, which are associated with poor prognosis, even with aggressive therapy.

=== Differences in screening ===
==== Barriers to early detection ====
Even with poor existing screening methods, around 20% of women with ovarian cancer are still effectively caught and diagnosed at early stages in the U.S. Research has revealed that not having private health insurance coverage decreases a woman's chance of being diagnosed with early stage ovarian cancer. African American women are less likely to be diagnosed at an early stage of ovarian cancer as compared to white women due to lower rates of private health insurance coverage. As a result, African American women have been found to be at higher risk of presenting with advanced, late-stage aggressive ovarian cancer for which current treatment standards can only palliate symptoms.

==== Genetic screening ====
Certain genetic components have been found to increase the susceptibility of carriers to develop ovarian cancer. Possession of specific mutations of the BRACA1 and BRACA2 genes impose a lifetime risk of developing ovarian cancer as high as 20-65%, compared to the 1.4-2.5% risk for a woman from the general population with no affected relatives. Hereditary nonpolyposis colorectal cancer, also known as Lynch syndrome, is also associated with elevated lifetime risk of developing ovarian cancer, at about 10-12%.

Genetic screenings are strongly advised for high-risk women who possess a family history of ovarian cancer or any of the aforementioned genetic alterations or who have been diagnosed with early onset colorectal, breast, uterine, or endometrial cancer. Within the U.S., African American women are less likely to undergo genetic counseling or testing as compared to Caucasian women. A national study of 25,364 people revealed that more Caucasian women report having heard about genetic testing for cancer risk as compared to African American, Asian, or Hispanic women, indicating the need for more culturally competent approaches to improve awareness of these screening methods.

=== Differences in treatment ===
In the U.S. and the rest of the developed world, surgery is the treatment standard for all stages of ovarian cancer. For later stages, adjuvant chemotherapy has been shown to improve patient survival. Lymphadenectomy and lymph node chemotherapy have also been demonstrated to improve survival for ovarian cancer patients of all stages.

The U.S. is the only country that has reported significant ovarian cancer treatment disparities. Within the U.S., African American patients have the highest risk of receiving delayed treatment, non-standard treatment, or no treatment at all. A multi-institutional study of 47,390 patients revealed that uninsured and Medicaid-insured patients to be at higher risk of receiving non-standard treatment compared to privately insured patients. Patients at community cancer hospitals compared to teaching hospitals were also at higher likelihood for receiving non-standard care. Overall, even with treatment guidelines made by many different organizations, several ovarian cancer patients are not receiving appropriate treatment, especially older and minority women without private insurance.

== Endometrial cancer disparities ==
Endometrial cancer incidence is rising in the U.S across all racial/ethnic groups. The highest increases in incidence rates for endometrial cancer have been observed in African American and Asian women, who tend to present with more aggressive subtypes of endometrial cancer. The overall racial disparity in survival from endometrial cancer between African Americans and whites is greater than in any other type of cancer.

=== Differences in treatment ===
African American women are less likely than white women to receive primary surgery for endometrial cancer. Their associated mortality rate from endometrial cancer has been found to be 84% higher than white women.

=== Differences in biological factors ===
It has been suggested that variance at the molecular level might underlie racial disparities in survival outcome. High expression of the mutant p53 tumor suppressor protein has been found to be associated with poor survival rates for endometrial cancer, and this malignant over-expression has been discovered to occur twice as frequently in blacks than in whites.

== Vulvar cancer disparities ==
Vulvar cancer is the fourth most common gynecologic cancer with approximately 940 deaths from this disease in the United States each year. If caught early without associated nodal involvement, vulvar cancer patients can be treated with a survival rate of 90%.

African American women have been shown to have better survival outcomes compared to whites for vulvar cancer even though they present with cancer at a significantly younger age. This has been explained by African American's higher rate of human papilloma virus HPV infection. Research reveals that African American women have a higher frequency of HPV-associated vulvar cancers than white women. HPV-positive vulvar cancer is associated with early age onset, less overall aggressive behavior, and better patient prognosis.

== Vaginal cancer disparities ==
Vaginal cancer is a rare cancer type that accounts for less than 1-2% of all gynecologic malignancies.

=== Differences in screening ===
Patients who are uninsured or with Medicaid are more likely to be diagnosed with advanced stage vaginal cancer than those with private insurance. Patients diagnosed at more advanced stages of vaginal cancer tend to have poorer survival outcomes. Studies have revealed that African Americans have a higher likelihood of being diagnosed with advanced stage vaginal cancer and are less likely to survive than their white counterparts.

=== Differences in treatment ===
For early stage vaginal cancer patients, surgery helps reduce mortality risk. One study revealed how a significantly lower proportion of African Americans with early stage vaginal cancer underwent surgery as compared to whites, which could partially explain differences in survival rates between these groups.

== Breast cancer ==
Black women have a lower risk of developing breast cancer, but they have a higher risk of dying from breast cancer.
