= Society of Gynecologic Oncology =

Medical specialty society

- Formation: 1969
- Type: Medical association Professional association
- Headquarters: 230 W. Monroe, Suite 710
- Location: Chicago, Illinois
- Members: > 2,000
- President: David E. Cohn, MD, MBA
- Key people: Pierre Désy, MPH, CAE Chief Executive Officer
- Website: http://www.sgo.org/

The Society of Gynecologic Oncology (SGO), headquartered in Chicago, Illinois, is the premier medical specialty society for health care professionals trained in the comprehensive management of gynecologic cancers, affecting the uterus, fallopian tubes, ovaries, cervix, vagina, and vulva. As a 501(c)(6) organization, the SGO contributes to the advancement of women's cancer care by encouraging research, providing education, raising standards of practice, advocating for patients and members and collaborating with other domestic and international organizations.

SGO has 2,000 members representing the entire gynecologic oncology team in the United States and abroad. Members include primarily gynecologic oncologists, as well as medical oncologists, pathologists, radiation oncologists, hematologists, surgical oncologists, obstetrician/gynecologists, nurses, physician assistants, social workers, fellows, residents and other allied health care professionals interested in the treatment and care of women's cancer. They regularly attend the Annual Meeting on Women's Cancer.

SGO members provide multidisciplinary cancer treatment including chemotherapy, radiation therapy, surgery and palliative care. They practice in a variety of settings, including academic institutions and hospitals, major regional cancer centers and private practice.

Gynecologic Oncology, published by Elsevier, is the official medical journal of SGO.

Mission statement

To promote the highest quality of comprehensive clinical care through education and research in the prevention and treatment of gynecologic cancers.

== History ==
The idea for a national medical association dedicated to the study and treatment of gynecologic cancer originated in February 1968 during a discussion between Drs. Hervy E. Averette and John J. Mikuta at a meeting of the Association of Professors of Gynecology and Obstetrics in New Orleans. Over time, a growing number of physicians signed on to the idea, and the society was formally founded at a meeting held in Key Biscayne, Florida in January 1969 under the chairmanship of George C. Lewis, Jr., MD.

== Past presidents ==
- 1969 - George C. Lewis, Jr., MD (deceased)
- 1970 - John L. Lewis, Jr., MD (deceased)
- 1971 - W. Norman Thornton, MD (deceased)
- 1972 - Hervy E. Averette, MD (deceased)
- 1973 - John J. Mikuta, MD (deceased)
- 1974 - Saul B. Gusberg, MD (deceased)
- 1975 - Felix N. Ruteledge, MD (deceased)
- 1976 - George W. Morley, MD (deceased)
- 1977 - Richard E. Symmonds, MD (deceased)
- 1978 - Richard C. Boronow, MD (deceased)
- 1979 - Hugh R.K. Barber, MD (deceased)
- 1980 - Leo D. Lagasse, MD
- 1981 - James H, Nelson, Jr., MD (deceased)
- 1982 - Philip J. DiSaia, MD (deceased)
- 1983 - Paul B. Underwood, Jr., MD
- 1984 - Julian P. Smith, MD (deceased)
- 1985 - Hugh M. Shingleton, MD (deceased)
- 1986 - Robert C. Park, MD (deceased)
- 1987 - Carmel J. Cohen, MD
- 1988 - William T. Creasman, MD
- 1989 - Clarence E. Ehrlich, MD (deceased)
- 1990 - C. Paul Morrow, MD
- 1991 - Wesley C. Fowler, Jr., MD
- 1992 - J. Taylor Wharton, MD
- 1993 - John R. van Nagell, Jr., MD
- 1994 - Rodrigue Mortel, MD
- 1995 - Stephen L. Curry, MD
- 1996 - David M. Gershenson, MD
- 1997 - Peter E. Schwartz, MD
- 1998 - Karl C. Podratz, MD, PhD
- 1999 - William J. Hoskins, MD
- 2000 - Carolyn D. Runowicz, MD
- 2001 - Michael L. Berman, MD
- 2002 - J. Max Austin, Jr., MD
- 2003 - Kenneth D. Hatch, MD
- 2004 - James W. Orr, Jr., MD
- 2005 - Beth Karlan, MD
- 2006 - Larry J. Copeland, MD
- 2007 - Andrew Berchuck, MD
- 2008 - Thomas Burke, MD
- 2009 - David Mutch, MD
- 2010 - Daniel Clarke-Pearson, MD
- 2011 - John P. Curtin, MD
- 2012 - Ronald D. Alvarez, MD
- 2013 - Barbara A. Goff, MD
- 2014 - Richard R. Barakat, MD
- 2015 - Robert L. Coleman, MD
- 2016 - Jeffrey M. Fowler, MD
- 2017 - Laurel W. Rice, MD
- 2018 - Carol L. Brown, MD
- 2019 - Warner K. Huh, MD
- 2020 - David E. Cohn, MD
- 2021 - S. Diane Yamada, MD
- 2022 - Stephanie V. Blank, MD

== See also ==
- Gynecology
- Oncology
- Ovarian cancer
- Cervical cancer
- Endometrial cancer
- Vaginal cancer
- Vulvar cancer
- Women's health
