= British Gynaecological Cancer Society =

- Address: C/o Williams Denton Cyf, Glaslyn, Ffordd Y Parc, Parc Menai, Bangor LL57 4FE, Bangor, United Kingdom
- President: Dr Thomas Ind
- Website: http://www.bgcs.org.uk

The British Gynaecological Cancer Society (BGCS) is a society of medical professionals who seek to improve the care provided to gynaecological cancer patients. The society describes its mission as being "to advance the science and art of gynaecological oncology for the benefit of the public."

== See also ==
- Cancer in the United Kingdom
