= Louise Ropes Loomis =

American historian

- Born: May 3, 1874; Yokohama, Japan
- Died: January 2, 1958 (aged 83); Pomfret, Connecticut, US
- Occupations: Historian, editor, translator, college professor
- Known for: Professor at Wells College, co-founder of the Berkshire Conference of Women Historians
- Relatives: Roger Sherman Loomis (brother); Evarts G. Loomis (nephew); Gertrude Schoepperle (sister-in-law); Laura Hibbard Loomis (sister-in-law)

Louise Ropes Loomis (May 3, 1874 – January 2, 1958) was an American historian, classicist, and translator. She was a professor of history at Wells College from 1921 to 1940, and editor of Classics Club Publications from the 1920s until 1949. In 1930, she co-founded the Berkshire Conference of Women Historians with Louise Fargo Brown.

== Early life and education ==
Louise Ropes Loomis was born in Yokohama, the daughter of Henry Loomis and Jane Herring Greene Loomis; her parents were Presbyterian missionaries in Japan. Her brother was Arthurian scholar Roger Sherman Loomis; physician Evarts G. Loomis was one of her nephews.

In 1897, Loomis graduated from Wellesley College, where she was a literary editor of The Wellesley Magazine. She earned a master's degree at Columbia University in 1902, and completed doctoral studies at there in 1906, with a dissertation titled "Medieval Hellenism".

== Career ==
Loomis was a lecturer in history at Barnard College, and was appointed Warden of Sage College at Cornell University in 1905. In 1906 and 1928, she spoke at the annual meetings of the American Historical Association. From 1921 to 1940, she was a professor of history at Wells College. In 1930, she co-founded the Berkshire Conference of Women Historians, with Louise Fargo Brown of Vassar College. She was editor of Classics Club Publications from the mid-1920s until 1949.

== Publications ==
- Medieval Hellenism (1906)
- "The Greek Renaissance in Italy" (1908)
- The Book of the Popes I (Liber pontificalis): To the Pontificate of Gregory I (translator, 1916)
- The see of Peter (with James T. Shotwell, 1927)
- "The Organization by Nations at Constance" (1932)
- "Nationality at the Council of Constance: An Anglo-French Dispute" (1939)
- Homer, The Iliad of Homer (editor, with Samuel Butler, 1942)
- Plato, Apology, Crito, Phaedo, Symposium, Republic (editor, with Benjamin Jowett, 1942)
- Aristotle, On man in the universe: Metaphysics, Parts of animals, Ethics, Politics, Poetics (editor, 1943)
- Homer, The Odyssey of Homer (editor, with Samuel Butler, 1944)
- The Council of Constance: The unification of the church (translator, with John Hine Mundy and Kennerly M. Woody, 1961)

== Personal life ==
Loomis lived with Mary Katharine Fuertes, daughter of Cornell engineer Estevan Antonio Fuertes, for many years (they are recorded as living together in the 1920, 1930, and 1940 federal censuses, and in the 1915 New York State census), and the two women co-owned a poultry farm in Washingtonville. Loomis died in 1958, in Pomfret, Connecticut, aged 83 years. Her papers are in the Rare Book and Manuscript Library of Columbia University.
