= Roger Sherman Loomis =

American scholar (1887–1966)

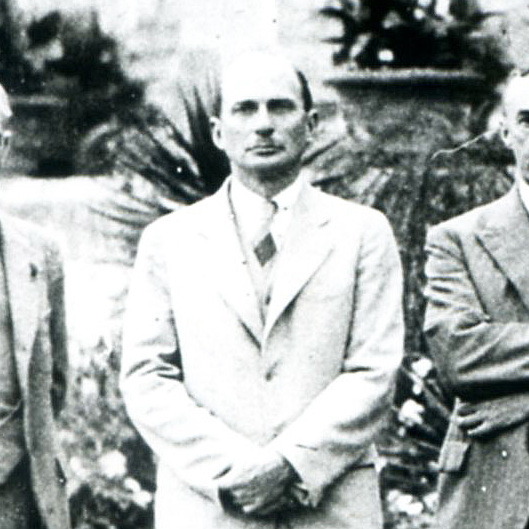
- Loomis in Truro at a meeting of the Arthurian Society (1930)
- Born: October 31, 1887; Yokohama, Japan
- Died: October 11, 1966 (aged 78); Waterford, Connecticut, U.S.
- Spouses: Gertrude Schoepperle (m. 1919; died 1921) Laura A. Hibbard (m. 1925; died 1960) Dorothy Bethurum (m. 1963)
- Relatives: Louise Ropes Loomis (sister); Evarts G. Loomis (nephew)

Academic background
- Education: Williams College (BA); Harvard University (MA); New College, Oxford (BLitt)
- Academic advisors: C. F. Bell; Arthur Napier

Academic work
- Discipline: Literature
- Sub-discipline: Medieval literature
- Institutions: Columbia University
- Doctoral students: Sigmund Eisner; Helaine Newstead
- Notable students: Joseph Campbell
- Main interests: Arthurian literature
- Notable works: Arthurian Tradition and Chrétien De Troyes (1949)

Roger Sherman Loomis (1887–1966) was an American scholar and one of the foremost authorities on medieval and Arthurian literature. Loomis is perhaps best known for showing the roots of Arthurian legend, in particular the Holy Grail, in native Celtic mythology.

== Biography ==
Roger Sherman Loomis was the son of Rev. Henry Loomis and Jane Herring Greene, the grandnephew of William Maxwell Evarts, and the great-great-grandson of American founding father Roger Sherman. Born on October 31, 1887, in Yokohama, Japan, he was educated at the Hotchkiss School in Lakeville, Connecticut.

He earned a Bachelor of Arts degree from Williams College in 1909, a Master of Arts degree from Harvard University in 1910, and, as a Rhodes Scholar, a Bachelor of Letters (BLitt) degree at New College, Oxford, in 1913. His BLitt dissertation, written under the supervision of Arthur Napier and C. F. Bell, was titled Illustrations of the Romances in Mediæval English Art. He held honorary degrees from Columbia, Williams, the University of Wales, and the University of Rennes in France.

He was an instructor at the University of Illinois Urbana-Champaign from 1913 to 1918. During the First World War he edited an Army publication Atenshun 21. He left Illinois for Columbia University, where he taught from 1919 until 1958: he was a member of Columbia's English faculty and held an emeritus position there from 1958 until his death in 1966. In 1919, also, Loomis married his first wife, Gertrude Schoepperle Loomis, (1882–1921), a medieval scholar who shared his interest in Arthurian literature (Folklore 38.4 1927 405–407).

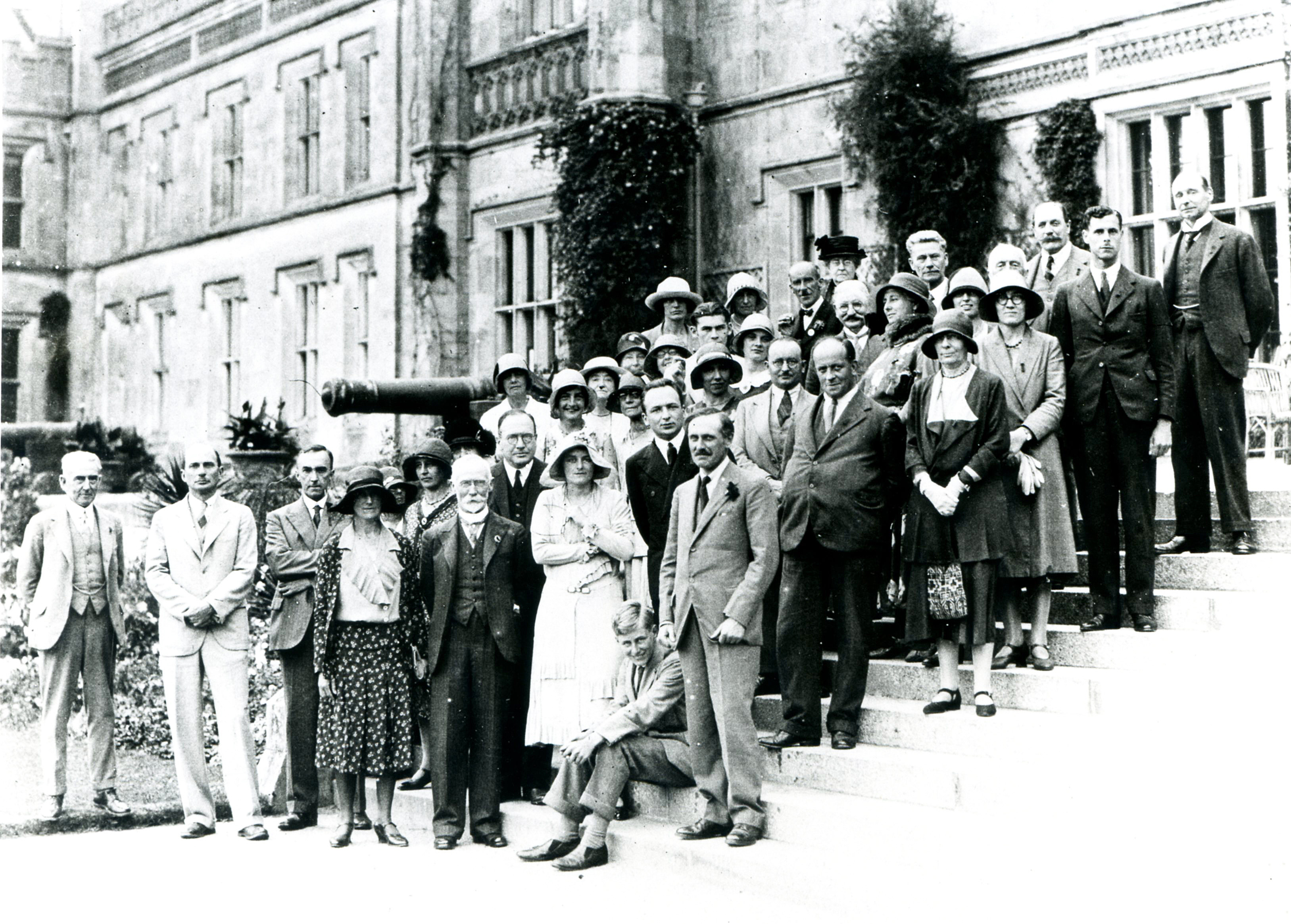
Arthurian Society meeting in Truro, Cornwall (August 1930)

From his early years he studied the influence of Celtic mythology on Arthurian legend, especially the Holy Grail romance. In 1930 Loomis attended the first International Arthurian Congress in Truro, Cornwall, where he, Henry Jenner, Dominica Legge, Eugène Vinaver, and other scholars investigated Arthurian legends. He was a member of the International Arthurian Society (president of American Branch, 1948–1963), the Modern Language Association, the Mediaeval Academy of America (fellow; second vice-president, 1961–1964), the Modern Humanities Research Association, and the American Humanist Association. In 1955–1956 he was an Eastman Professor at the University of Oxford.

Loomis wrote ten scholarly books and numerous journal articles. His book A Mirror of Chaucer's World, published in 1965 by Princeton, is a pictorial presentation of drawings, sculpture, paintings and other materials related to Geoffrey Chaucer and his age. His most notable book Arthurian Tradition and Chrétien de Troyes, published by Columbia University in 1949, won the Haskins Medal of the Mediaeval Academy of America.

After the death of his first wife in 1921, Loomis married Laura Alandis Hibbard (1883–1960), with whom he collaborated in many of his research and writing efforts. He dedicated one of his final volumes to Gertrude Schoepperle Loomis and Laura Hibbard Loomis "in grateful and loving remembrance" (The Grail: From Celtic Myth to Christian Symbol published by the University of Wales 1963; and later by Princeton University, in 1991).

Loomis died on October 11, 1966, in Waterford, Connecticut.

== Works ==
- Illustrations of Medieval Romance on Tiles from Chertsey Abbey (1916)
- Freshman Readings (1925)
- Celtic Myth and Arthurian Romance (1927)
- The Art of Writing Prose (1930) with Mabel Louise Robinson, Helen Hull and Paul Cavanaugh
- Models for Writing Prose (1931)
- The Romance of Tristram and Ysolt (1931) translator
- Tristan and Isolt: A study of the Sources of the Romance by Gertrude Schoepperle Loomis, 2d ed., expanded by a bibliography and critical essay on Tristan scholarship since 1912, by Roger Sherman Loomis (New York, B. Franklin, 1960)
- Arthurian Legends in Medieval Art (1938) with Laura Hibbard Loomis
- Introduction to Medieval Literature, Chiefly in England. Reading List and Bibliography (1939)
- Representative Medieval And Tudor Plays (1942) editor with Henry W. Wells
- The Fight for Freedom: College Reading in Wartime (1943) with Gabriel M. Liegey
- Modern English Readings (1945) editor with Donald Lemen Clark
- Medieval English Verse and Prose (1948) with Rudolph Willard
- Arthurian Tradition and Chrétien De Troyes (1949)
- Wales and the Arthurian Legend (1956)
- Medieval Romances (1957) editor with Laura Hibbard Loomis
- Arthurian Literature in the Middle Ages, A Collaborative History (1959) editor
- The Grail: From Celtic Myth to Christian Symbol (1963)
- The Development of Arthurian Romance (1963)
- A Mirror of Chaucer's World (1965)
- The Arthurian Material in the Chronicles: Especially Those in Great Britain and France (1973) expansion of Robert Huntington Fletcher's 1906 book
- Lanzelet (2005) translator Thomas Kerth, notes by Loomis and Kenneth G. T. Webster

Awards
Preceded by Raymond de Roover	Haskins Medal; 1951	Succeeded by Alexander Vasiliev
