= Gladys McGarey =

American holistic medicine practitioner (1920–2024)

- Born: Gladys Louise Taylor; November 30, 1920; Fatehgarh, United Provinces of Agra and Oudh, British India
- Died: September 28, 2024 (aged 103)
- Occupation(s): Holistic physician, educator, and writer
- Years active: 1940s–2024
- Known for: Promoting holistic medicine, conducting humanitarian missions, co-founding and leading medical organizations
- Spouse: William A. McGarey (m. 1943; death 2008)
- Parent(s): John and Elizabeth (née Siehl) Taylor, medical missionaries
- Relatives: Carl E. Taylor (brother)

Gladys Louise McGarey (née Taylor, November 30, 1920 – September 28, 2024) was an American holistic physician and medical activist. Over her career, McGarey promoted better childbirth practices, holistic medicine, and acupuncture through her medical practice, speeches, and books. She co-founded the American Holistic Medical Association in 1978 and served as its president. She also co-founded the Academy of Parapsychology and Medicine, and she served as president of the Arizona Board of Homeopathic Medical Examiners.

McGarey was awarded medical and lifetime achievement awards over the course of her life, including being honored as a Pioneer of Holistic Medicine by the American Holistic Medical Association and being inducted into the Arizona Women's Hall of Fame.

== Early life ==
Born in Fatehgarh, India on November 30, 1920, Gladys Louise Taylor was the fourth child of Dr. John Taylor and Dr. Elizabeth (Beth) Taylor, two Reformed Presbyterian Church missionaries who traveled to remote areas of India to deliver medical care. Her mother was one of the "world’s first female doctors, earning her degree in osteopathic medicine". Her father was also an ordained minister in addition to being an osteopathic physician himself.

Her parents left Cincinnati, Ohio for India in 1914 and settled in a Reformed Presbyterian mission north of New Delhi in the village of Roorkee. (Note: Powers states that they were from Mussoorie, but it was really Roorkee, according to this newspaper article. Both places are north of New Delhi.) They each had their own treatment tents. The Taylor family frequently moved to and from villages in the jungle. They offered free medical care to all people, regardless of caste, and many of their patients were children of parents with Hansen's disease, also known as leprosy. Gladys saw her parents treat "every imaginable affliction." They founded a home for the children with Hansen's disease. During the conflict-ridden period after the Partition of India, the Taylors treated the injured, prevented the spread of disease through immunizations, and buried the dead. Their work was recognized by Mahatma Gandhi. John and Beth were missionaries in India until 1967. Towards the end of his life, John published India—Dr. John Taylor Remembers. Beth died in 1970 and John followed in 1973.

Taylor had a sister, Margaret, and three brothers, John, Carl, and Gordon. (Note: Her brothers John, Carl, and Gordon, were dental, medical, and religious missionaries in India.) She studied at the Woodstock School in India.

== Medical school and internship ==
In 1935, Taylor came to the United States, where she studied and graduated from Muskingum University in New Concord, Ohio, and then received her medical degree from Woman's Medical College of Pennsylvania in Philadelphia. Taylor interned at the Deaconess Hospital in Cincinnati, in 1946. She was the lone woman among male interns, and managed the experience by remembering her father's advice to "never give up".

== Personal life ==
Gladys Taylor met and four years later on December 20, 1943, married William McGarey at the Immanuel Presbyterian Church in Cincinnati, Ohio, becoming Gladys McGarey. Both passed their Ohio Medical Board examinations in June 1947 and intended to be missionaries. (Note: Their intention at the time was to run a church-supported hospital and improve the care of poor and malnurished people, treat tropical diseases, and improve childbirth practices.) In 1947, William, a graduate of the College of the Ozarks, was a medical resident at the Cincinnati General Hospital.

They had six children, Carl, John, Bob, Analea, Helene, and David. Analea wrote the book Born to Heal about her mother. They divorced when McGarey was 70, after 46 years of marriage. William McGarey died on November 3, 2008. His medical career was much like his wife's; he practiced holistic medicine and acupuncture, was co-founder of holistic and other medical organizations, incorporated Cayce's medical theories into his practice, and was an author. His residence was in Scottsdale, Arizona at the time of his death.

McGarey died on September 28, 2024, at the age of 103.

== Medical practice ==
She specialized and became board-certified in Holistic and Integrated Medicine, believing in a holistic approach to medicine through the "interconnectedness of all aspects [of a person] – body, mind, emotions, spirit" as opposed to the general practice of issuing prescriptions to treat disease and injuries.

McGarey and William opened a medical practice in Wellsville, Ohio after she completed her internship. In 1952, William was drafted and served in the Air Force. Three years later, the family of six moved to Phoenix, where William worked at a county hospital.

For 60 years, she operated a family practice where she focused on prevention and wellness, including some of Edgar Cayce's beliefs about living a healthy lifestyle through diet, nutrition, and being wellness-centered. She said, "Unless our primary focus is toward enhancing life rather than simply killing diseases, we will not really understand where healing comes from." She introduced the mind, body, spirit approach to healing, as well as prayer and meditation, to treat her patients. McGarey spoke at many Association for Research and Enlightenment (ARE) events.

She helped introduce acupuncture to the U.S. and was one of the first medical physicians to use acupuncture to treat her patients. In addition to teaching, she has written books and delivered speeches about natural childbirth and acupuncture.

McGarey sought to integrate holistic practices within traditional medical practice in other countries. She conducted scientific research and education through the organization that she founded in 1989, Gladys Taylor McGarey Foundation, now known as The Foundation for Living Medicine. The foundation's activities include education on the integration of holistic medical practices with traditional medical care, including childbirth, humanitarian efforts, and patient awareness. The foundation was recognized in 2008 for their work at University of Arizona Medical School where they taught the ways in which integrative medicine improves patient's recovery. (Note: There are two Colleges of Medicine at University of Arizona, UA College of Medicine - Tucson and UA College of Medicine - Phoenix.) In 2009, McGarey responded to President Barack Obama's request to identify the ways in which the health care system in the United States could be improved. Her response was based upon the feedback of a symposium she conducted in May 2009 with 35 Alternative Medicine physicians.

McGarey provided humanitarian aid in Tibet, India, and other countries. Her approach was to integrate new treatment practices with traditional healing practices.

She joined her brother Carl E. Taylor — founding chair of the Department of International Health at Johns Hopkins Bloomberg School of Public Health — on a humanitarian medical operation in Afghanistan after he told her that Afghanistan had the highest rate of maternal mortality in the world. In Afghanistan, McGarey taught women how to take care of themselves while pregnant, including diet and nutrition, and childbirth practices that reduced infant mortality 47% in the rural areas that she visited.

McGarey, her husband William, Evarts Loomis, Gerald Looney, and C. Norm Shealy co-founded the American Holistic Medical Association in 1978 and McGarey served as its vice president and president. They decided to spell holistic with an "h" rather than a "w" because the Anglo Saxon world "hal" was the root word for "holy," "health" and "healing".

She co-founded the Academy of Parapsychology and Medicine and served as president of the Arizona Board of Homeopathic Medical Examiners. Over her career, she has been known as the "Mother of Holistic Medicine".

== Honors and awards ==
Awards in the field of medicine:

- The David Stackhouse award for pioneering excellence in Homeopathy
- The YWCA "Tribute to Women" award in the healer category
- The Native American Elder Award from the Phoenix Area of Indian Health Services
- In 2003, she was honored as a Pioneer of Holistic Medicine by the American Holistic Medical Association

Other awards:

- Humanities Award for Outstanding Service to Mankind, presented by the National Committee for the Advancement of Parapsychology and Medicine
- One of the Top Ten Arizona Women of 1993
- The 2001 Lifetime Distinguished Service Award from Muskingum College in Ohio
- Best-selling author for The Well-Lived Life (2024).

== Publications ==
=== Books ===
- McGarey, Gladys. The Well-Lived Life: A 103-Year-Old Doctor's Six Secrets to Health and Happiness at Every Age. Atria Books, 2024.
- McGarey, Gladys. The Well-Lived Life: A 102-Year-Old Doctor's Six Secrets to Health and Happiness at Every Age. Atria Books, 2023.
- McGarey, Gladys, and Ann McCombs. Living Medicine: Beyond Holistic Medicine. Waterside Productions, 2020.
- McGarey, Gladys, and Eveline Horelle Dalley. The World Needs Old Ladies. Living Medicine Publishing, 2013.
- McGarey, Gladys. Born to Live. Living Medicine Publishing, 2008.
- McGarey, Gladys, and Jess Stearn. The Physician Within You. 2000.

=== Articles ===
The following is a listing of articles that Dr. Gladys has written for Venture Inward, the official magazine of the Association for Research and Enlightenment (A.R.E.). Venture Inward is a bi-monthly magazine that is published for the members and affiliates of the Edgar Cayce Foundation. Venture Inward seeks to inspire, challenge, and expand human awareness in spiritual development, mystical experience, philosophy, parapsychology, and holistic health.

- Wellness and Holistic Life
- Planting Our Souls
- Focusing on Health, NOT the Disease
- The Choice for Pregnancy
- Our Body Is the Temple of the Living God
- Every Cell Has Regenerative Consciousness
- Facing Hard Times Gracefully
- ‘Fire is Ever Ire’
- The Journey from Head to Heart
- Karma Is Just Memory
- The Kurpe and Sickle and the Silver Cup
- Letting Our Soul Shine
- The Healing Power of Love
- The Rhythm of the Rocking Chair
- Why Did the Shirley Temple Doll Become Barbie?
- To Know Ourselves

== Sources ==
- Jodi Powers, ed. (July 2010). "Gladys McGarey" (PDF). Amelia Magazine: Modern Women Pioneers.
