= With Child: A Diary of Motherhood =

1979 book by Phyllis Chesler

- First edition
- Author: Phyllis Chesler
- Language: English
- Publisher: T. Y. Crowell
- Publication date: October 26, 1979

With Child: A Diary of Motherhood is a non-fiction book by Phyllis Chesler, a feminist who gave birth to a son, published on October 26, 1979, by T. Y. Crowell.

Caroline Seebohm of The New York Times wrote that Chesler's status as one of several "so-called radical feminists" is a characteristic that "stands out of the crowd".

== Reception ==
Seebohm expressed admiration for the development of the book since Chesler expressed a commonality with other women going through motherhood. Seebohm stated that there was irony since Chesler, in Women and Madness, had, in Seebohm's words, "exhorts women to shake themselves free of the models of mothering and nurturing so long imposed upon them, she believes, by a male dominated society." Chesler disputed this characterization in a letter to the editor, but Seebohm stood by it.

Kirkus Reviews wrote that "these journal entries are intimate and oddly involving." Kirkus stated that the book does not examine "some key issues" and that the work "is hardly novel and her privileged situation may turn some readers away."
