= Laura Hibbard Loomis =

American literary scholar (1883–1960)

- Born: June 18, 1883; Chicago, Illinois, U.S.
- Died: August 25, 1960 (aged 77); New York City, New York, U.S.
- Occupations: Scholar, college professor
- Spouse: Roger Sherman Loomis
- Relatives: Louise Ropes Loomis (sister-in-law)

Laura Alandis Hibbard Loomis (June 18, 1883 – August 25, 1960) was an American literary scholar and college professor who specialized in medieval English literature.

== Early life ==
Laura Alandis Hibbard was born in Chicago, the daughter of Frederick Alan Hibbard and Margaret McMullen Hibbard. She graduated from Hyde Park High School there. She earned a bachelor's degree at Wellesley College in 1905, and a master's degree in 1908. She won Wellesley's Alice Freeman Palmer fellowship for research abroad in 1910. She completed doctoral studies at the University of Chicago in 1916.

== Career ==
Hibbard taught at Mount Holyoke College from 1908 to 1916. From 1916 to 1943, she taught at Wellesley College, achieving full professor status in 1929, and held the Katharine Lee Bates Endowed Chair in English Literature. One of her students at Wellesley was Chinese writer Bing Xin. She published her research in academic journals including Speculum, PMLA, Modern Philology, and Modern Language Notes. She served a term as vice-president of the Modern Language Association.

In retirement, Loomis moved to live and work full-time with her husband Roger Sherman Loomis in New York City (rather than commuting, as she had done for years), and taught at Hunter College and at Columbia University. In 1953, she arranged an exhibition of medieval paintings at the Morgan Library, and wrote a book to accompany the show.

== Publications ==
- Three Middle English romances: King Horn, Havelok, Beves of Hampton (1911)
- Mediæval romance in England; a study of the sources and analogues of the non-cyclic metrical romances (1924, with Roger Sherman Loomis)
- "Arthur's Round Table" (1926)
- The table of the Last Supper in religious and secular iconography (1927)
- "Observations on the 'Pèlerinage Charlemagne'" (1928, with Tom Peete Cross)
- "Geoffrey of Monmouth and Stonehenge" (1930)
- "Sir Thopas and David and Goliath" (1936)
- Arthurian legends in medieval art (1938, with Roger Sherman Loomis)
- "Chaucer and the Breton Lays of the Auchinleck MS" (1941)
- "The Auchinleck Manuscript and a Possible London Bookshop of 1330-1340" (1942)
- "The Holy Relics of Charlemagne and King Athelstan: The Lances of Longinus and St. Mauricius" (1950)
- The passion lance relic and the war cry Montjoie in the Chanson de Roland and related texts (1950)
- "The Athelstan Gift Story: Its Influence on English Chronicles and Carolingian Romances" (1952)
- Medieval Vista (1953)
- "Secular Dramatics in the Royal Palace, Paris, 1378, 1389, and Chaucer's 'Tregetoures'" (1958)

== Personal life ==
Hibbard married fellow literary scholar Roger Sherman Loomis in 1925. His first wife was Hibbard's friend, Gertrude Schoepperle, who died in 1921. She died in 1960, aged 77 years, in New York City. Adventures in the Middle Ages; A Memorial Collection of Essays and Studies by Laura Hibbard Loomis (1973) was published in her memory.
