= New Utrecht High School =

Public school in New York City

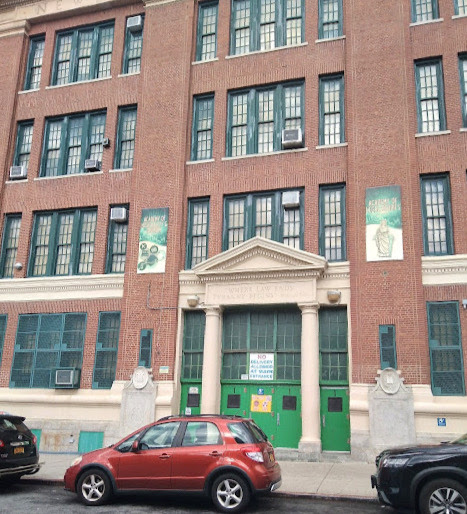

Location
- 1601 80th St; Brooklyn, New York 11214; United States; 40.6132°N 74.003°W

Information
- Type: Public
- Established: September 13, 1915
- School district: New York City Geographic District #20
- School code: K445
- NCES School ID: 360015102036
- Principal: Svetlana Litvin
- Teaching staff: 224.54 (on an FTE basis)
- Grades: 9-12
- Enrollment: 3,125 (2023–24)
- Student to teacher ratio: 15
- Campus type: Urban
- Colors: Green and white
- Mascot: Utes
- Website: www.newutrechthighschoolnyc.com

New Utrecht High School is a public high school located in Bensonhurst, a neighborhood of Brooklyn, New York. The school is operated by the New York City Department of Education under District 20 and serves students of grades 9 to 12.

A total of 40.5% of students are Asian-American, constituting a plurality of the student population. The school was ranked 12th out of 542 high schools in New York City for number of students in the 2022–23 academic year.

== History ==
New Utrecht High School was established in 1915 as an offshoot of the nearby coeducational Bay Ridge High School. New Utrecht High School became an all-boys school, while Bay Ridge High School became an all-girls school.

The school's first location was a wooden building on 86th Street and 18th Avenue, with a population of 350 students. Irving Hazen was the founding principal, and he adopted the green and white colors of his alma mater, Dartmouth College, as the school's colors.

In November 1924, the school moved to its present location on 80th Street and 16th Avenue, with 2,300 students. In February of the following year, girls were admitted, resulting in the school becoming coeducational. Over the next few years, the school continued to grow, consisting of a main building and four annexes, with a student population of nearly 11,000. It was the largest student body in the world at the time. In 1930, with a student population of 9,000, it was reported that 10 communists attacked the student government while they were debating.

New Utrecht High School was the scene of several racial conflicts between black and white youth within the community in the 1970s to 1990s. In 1974, 300 black students stormed the school after a fight between a black student and a white student ended with the black student being injured, spurring rumors that the incident was a racial attack. Three white students and two black students were arrested in the aftermath of the school incident. In 1990, a black student was shot by a group of white students stemming from an incident in the school locker room.

In the 2000s, New Utrecht High School underwent a major overhaul. It added a new, two-story cafeteria building, which replaced the old cafeteria located in the main building. The old cafeteria was subsequently turned into classroom space. A new entrance was also created, accompanied by a corridor connecting the cafeteria building with the main building.

Today, New Utrecht High School functions as a zoned school primarily serving students living in the neighborhoods of Bensonhurst and Dyker Heights in Brooklyn, New York.

As of 2024, the principal of the school is Svetlana Litvin.

Name	Service began	Service ended	Years
Svetlana Litvin	2021	Active	5
Maureen Goldfarb	2006	2021	15
Howard J. Lucks	1997	2006	9
Allen Leibowitz	1985	1997	12
Michael A. Russo	1971	1985	14
Isaac Hersh	1957	1971	14
Francis J. Griffith	1946–1950, 1955	1957	6
Abraham H. Lass	1950	1955	5
Leo R. Ryan	1942	1946	4
Maurice E. Rogalin	1936	1942	6
Harry A. Potter	1917	1936 (Note: It's unlikely but possible that there was another principal from 1932 to 1936, as the latest documentation found of Harry Potter as principal is from 1932.)	19
Irving A. Hazen	1915	1917	2

== Demographics ==
A plurality of New Utrecht's student body is Asian-American, reflecting the high Asian population of Bensonhurst and the surrounding neighborhoods. A significant portion of the student population is Hispanic. Both the Asian and Hispanic percentages have increased and continue to do so, while percentages for White and Black students have consistently decreased over the past decade.

There is a large gender gap among the student body. In the 2023-24 school year, 55.0%, or 1,720 students, were male; only 45.0%, or 1,405 students, were female. In addition, 16.4% of students have disabilities, 18.3% are English Language Learners, 79.4% are in poverty, and 79.9% are considered to be part of the Economic Needs Index.

Student demographics
Race	Students, 2003	Percentage, 2003	Students, 2013	Percentage, 2013	Students, 2023	Percentage, 2023	Change (Note: Change in percentage from 2003 to 2023)
Asian	738	26.1%	1,253	38.0%	1,265	40.5%	▲14.4%
Hispanic	666	23.5%	947	28.7%	1,117	35.7%	▲12.2%
White	1,124	39.7%	933	28.3%	626	20.0%	▼19.7%
Black	302	10.7%	144	4.4%	69	2.2%	▼8.5%
Other	3	0.1%	17	0.5%	48	1.5%	▲1.4%
Total	2,833	100%	3,294	100%	3,125	100%	–

=== Enrollment ===
Total number of students (Note: The table does not show available enrollment data from 1976 to 1998. You can view this data by clicking on the two references before this note.)
Year	Students	Change
1997–1998	2,734	N/A
1998–1999	2,594	▼140
1999–2000	2,580	▼14
2000–2001	2,643	▲63
2001–2002	2,728	▲85
2002–2003	2,602	▼126
2003–2004	2,833	▲231
2004–2005	2,934	▲101
2005–2006	3,067	▲133
2006–2007	2,989	▼78
2007–2008	3,007	▲18
2008–2009	2,821	▼186
2009–2010	2,937	▲116
2010–2011	3,228	▲291
2011–2012	3,259	▲31
2012–2013	3,262	▲3
2013–2014	3,294	▲32
2014–2015	3,469	▲175
2015–2016	3,545	▲76
2016–2017	3,613	▲68
2017–2018	3,547	▼66
2018–2019	3,427	▼120
2019–2020	3,480	▲53
2020–2021	3,572	▲92
2021–2022	3,336	▼236
2022–2023	3,118	▼218
2023–2024	3,125	▲7

== Curriculum ==
New Utrecht High School offers a variety of classes to fulfill the credit requirements for New York City students, including electives such as art and music classes, the student government, and math team. Most academic classes are available at the Honors level for higher-achieving students, and the school offers many Advanced Placement courses.

=== Academies ===
There are several academies at New Utrecht High School, some of which offer employment-oriented training in specialized fields, which include:

- Academy of Business and Technology
- Academy of Medical Professions and Health Careers
- Academy of Legal Studies
- Academy of Hospitality and Tourism
- Academy of Art and Design
- Academy of Asian Studies
- Academy of Computer Science
- Honors Academy

Some of the academies are associated with NAF, a non-profit organization originally known as the National Academy Foundation.

== Proficiency ==
The graduation rate in June 2022 was 73.8%, a decline from 81.2% in June 2021 and 85.1% in June 2020.

During the 2021–22 school year, 44% of students were classified as chronically absent by the New York State Department of Education, including over 57% of Hispanic students and almost 79% of black students. In comparison, around 54% of white students were chronically absent and just under 24% of Asian students, suggesting strong inequities in school attendance.

=== Regents scores ===
The following table lists a report of Regents scores from June 2023.

Examination	Students tested	Level 1	Level 2	Level 3	Level 4	Level 5	Proficient (Levels 3–5)	Proficiency compared to state
English Language Arts	29%	17%	15%	25%	16%	28%	68%	▼9%
Algebra I	25%	20%	21%	37%	12%	11%	59%	▼6%
Geometry	24%	36%	16%	27%	8%	14%	49%	▼4%
Algebra II	12%	33%	13%	32%	12%	10%	54%	▼10%
Living Environment	20%	26%	14%	43%	17%	(Note: Level 4 is the highest proficiency level for this examination.)	60%	▼6%
Earth Science	10%	37%	16%	34%	13%		47%	▼18%
Chemistry	16%	28%	21%	40%	12%		51%	▼14%
Physics	4%	21%	20%	44%	15%		59%	▼9%
Global History and Geography II	26%	13%	18%	39%	16%	14%	69%	▼5%
United States History and Government	21%	11%	17%	37%	31%	4%	72%	▼8%

=== SAT scores ===
The mean SAT score among New Utrecht students in Spring 2024 was a 966, with a 472 in English and a 495 in Mathematics. This is below the national average of 1028.

== Notable alumni ==
- Walter Adams (1922–1998): economist, university president
- Koby Altman (born 1982): professional basketball general manager
- Carmine Appice (born 1946): musician, drummer
- Steve Augeri (born 1959): singer
- Troy Ave (born 1985): rapper
- Lord Have Mercy (born 1973): rapper
- Gene Barry (born Eugene Klass; 1919–2009): actor
- Seymour Benzer (1921–2007): biologist
- Barbara Aronstein Black (born 1933): academic dean
- Abe Burrows (1910–1985): playwright
- Pat Capri (1918–1989): professional baseball player
- Jack Carter: comedian
- Ronald Castorina: politician
- Phyllis Chesler: feminist author, psychologist
- Joseph Colombo (1923–1978): criminal
- Louis "Louie Bagels" Daidone (born 1946): criminal
- Billy DeMars (1925–2020): professional baseball player, coach
- Max Desfor (1913–2018): photographer
- Victor Dorman (1915–1995): packaging process inventor
- Amram Ducovny (1927–2003): writer
- Stanley Ellin: author
- Jerry Ferrara: actor
- Cy Feuer: playwright, stage director, producer
- Stanley Fink (1936–1997): politician
- Eli Friedman (born 1933): nephrologist
- Leo Friedman: Broadway photographer
- Allen Funt (1914–1999): TV personality
- GASHI (born 1989): rapper
- David Geffen (born 1943): media mogul
- Ralph Ginzburg (1929–2006): author, editor, publisher, photojournalist
- Bernice Gottlieb (née Bernice Friedman; born 1931): pioneer in the transracial adoption movement, real estate executive
- Philip Habib (1920–1992): diplomat
- Buddy Hackett (born Leonard Hacker; 1924–2003): comedian
- Barbara Grizzuti Harrison: writer
- Sal Iacono: television comedian
- David Ignatow: poet, author
- Gabe Kaplan (born 1945): comic, actor, poker player
- Michael Kidd (1915–2007): choreographer
- Harvey Lembeck (1923–1982): actor
- Howard Levy: dermatologist, Vietnam War resister
- Steve Lombardi: professional wrestler
- Paulie Malignaggi: professional boxer
- Harold Martin (1918–2010): politician
- Patty McCormack: actress
- Robert Merrill (1917–2004): opera singer
- Walter Mischel (1930–2018): psychologist famous for the Marshmallow Test and contributions to personality and social psychology
- Art Modell (1925–2012): businessman, entrepreneur, professional sports team owner
- Doretta Morrow: actress
- Sam Nahem (1915–2004): professional baseball player
- Angela "Big Ang" Raiola: TV personality
- Anthony Ramos: actor, singer
- Teddy Reig (1918–1984): jazz record producer, promoter, artist manager
- Daniel Rodriguez: singer
- Stan Rosen (1906–1984): professional football player
- Spencer Ross: sportscaster
- Herschel Savage: pornographic actor
- John Saxon (1936–2020): actor
- Ralph Snyderman (born 1940): physician, scientist, administrator
- Arnold Stang: comedian, actor
- Martha Stewart (1922–2021): film and TV actress, singer
- Robert Treuhaft (1912-2001): labor movement attorney, defended 700 UC Berkeley students on trial for protesting during the Free Speech Movement.
- Tony Visconti (born 1944): music producer

== In popular culture ==
New Utrecht High School is the venue for key scenes in the 1947 movie It Happened in Brooklyn, starring Frank Sinatra, Kathryn Grayson, Jimmy Durante, and Peter Lawford.

The front and rear views of the school building were used in the opening and closing scenes of the TV sitcom Welcome Back, Kotter, which starred alumnus Gabe Kaplan.

== Gallery ==
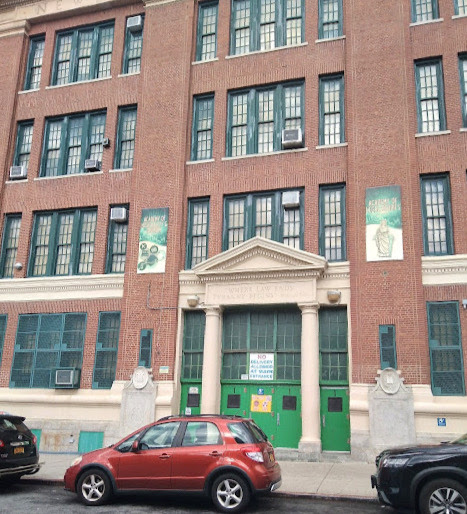
Main entrance, 2023

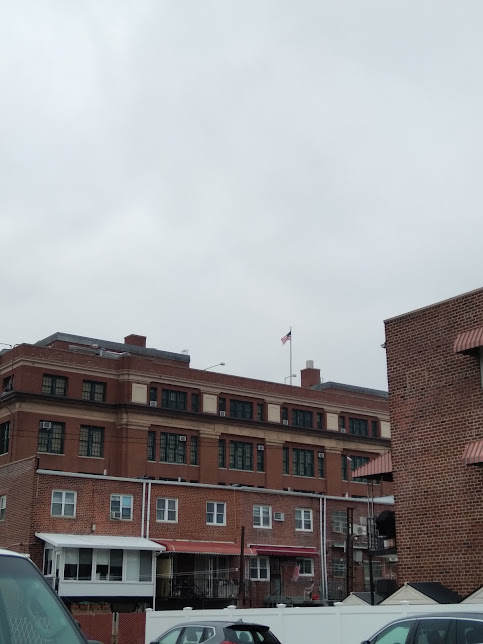
View from 81st St. and 16th Ave., 2023

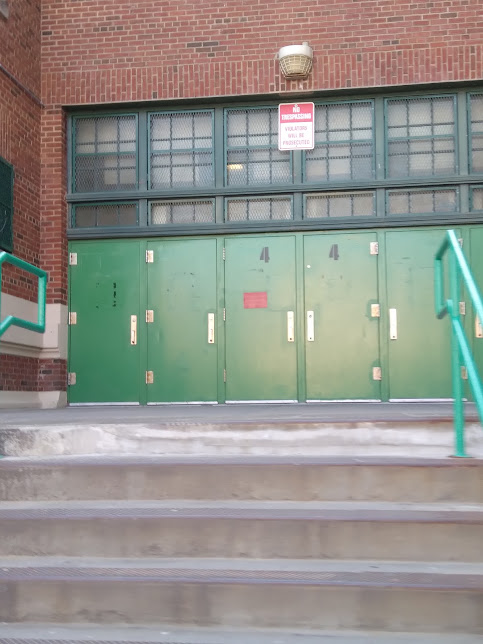
79th St. student entrance, 2023

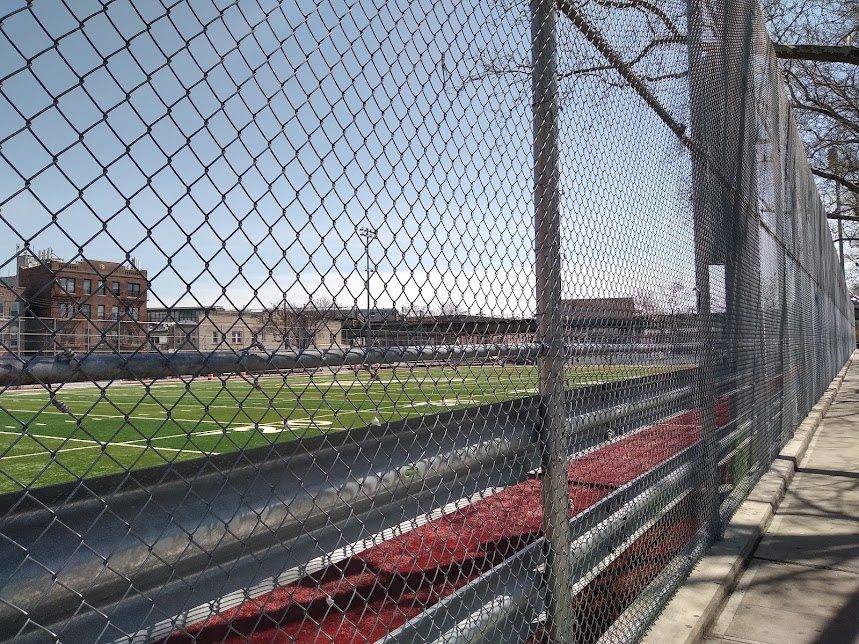
View of the field from 80th St., 2023

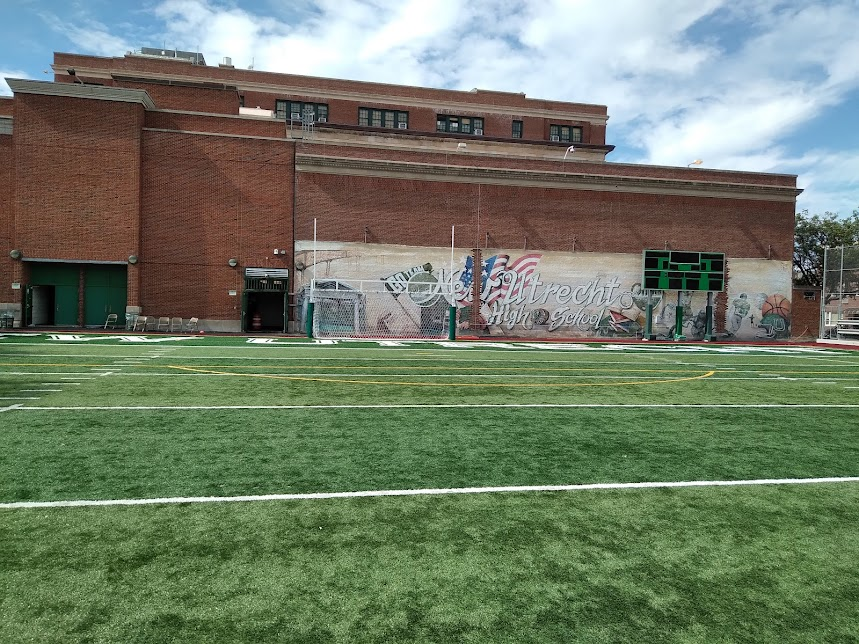
Rear of the building, 2021

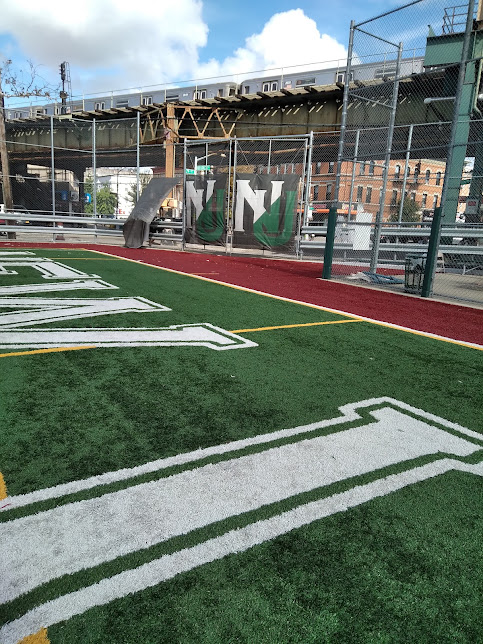
View of the train from the field, 2021

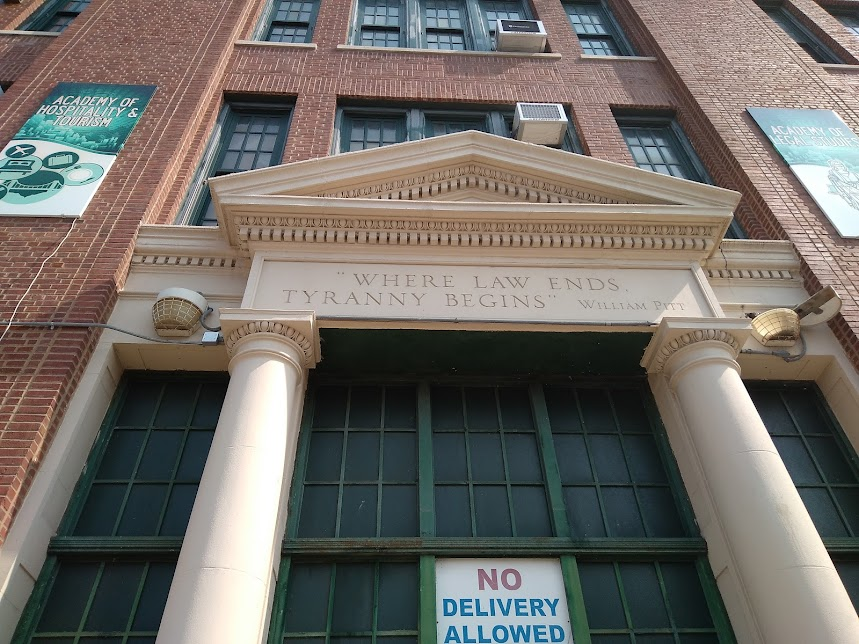
The entranceway of the school, 2021

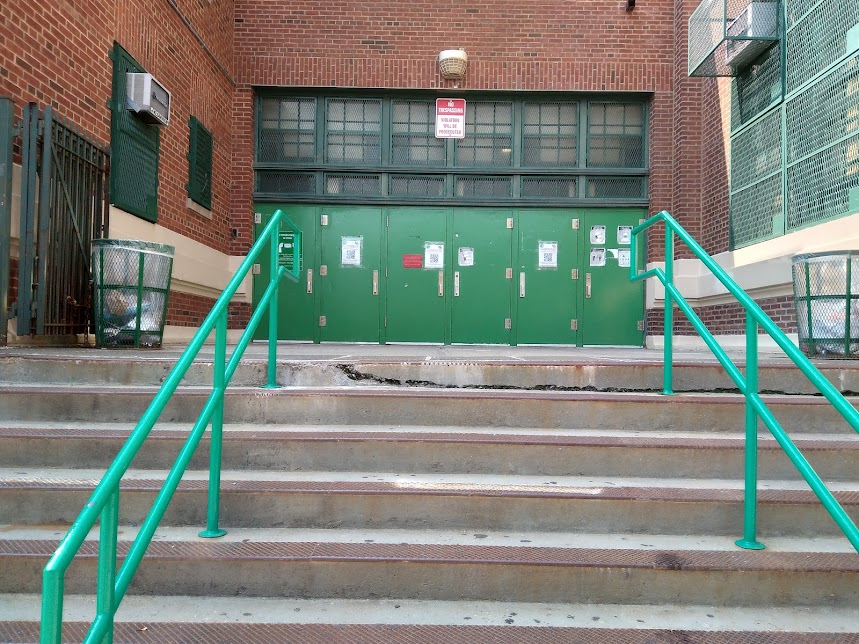
79th St. student entrance, 2021

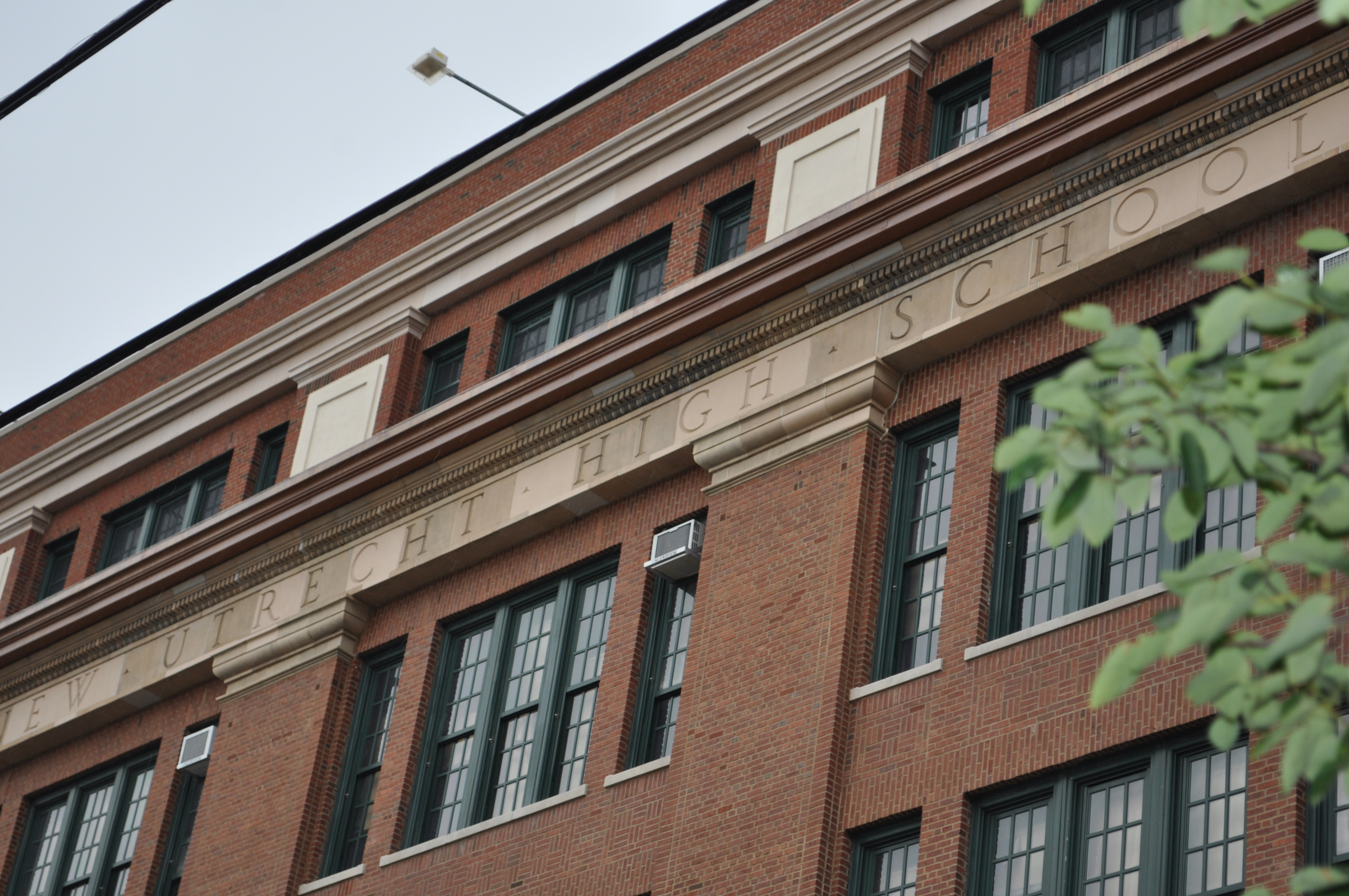
The side of the school, 2013

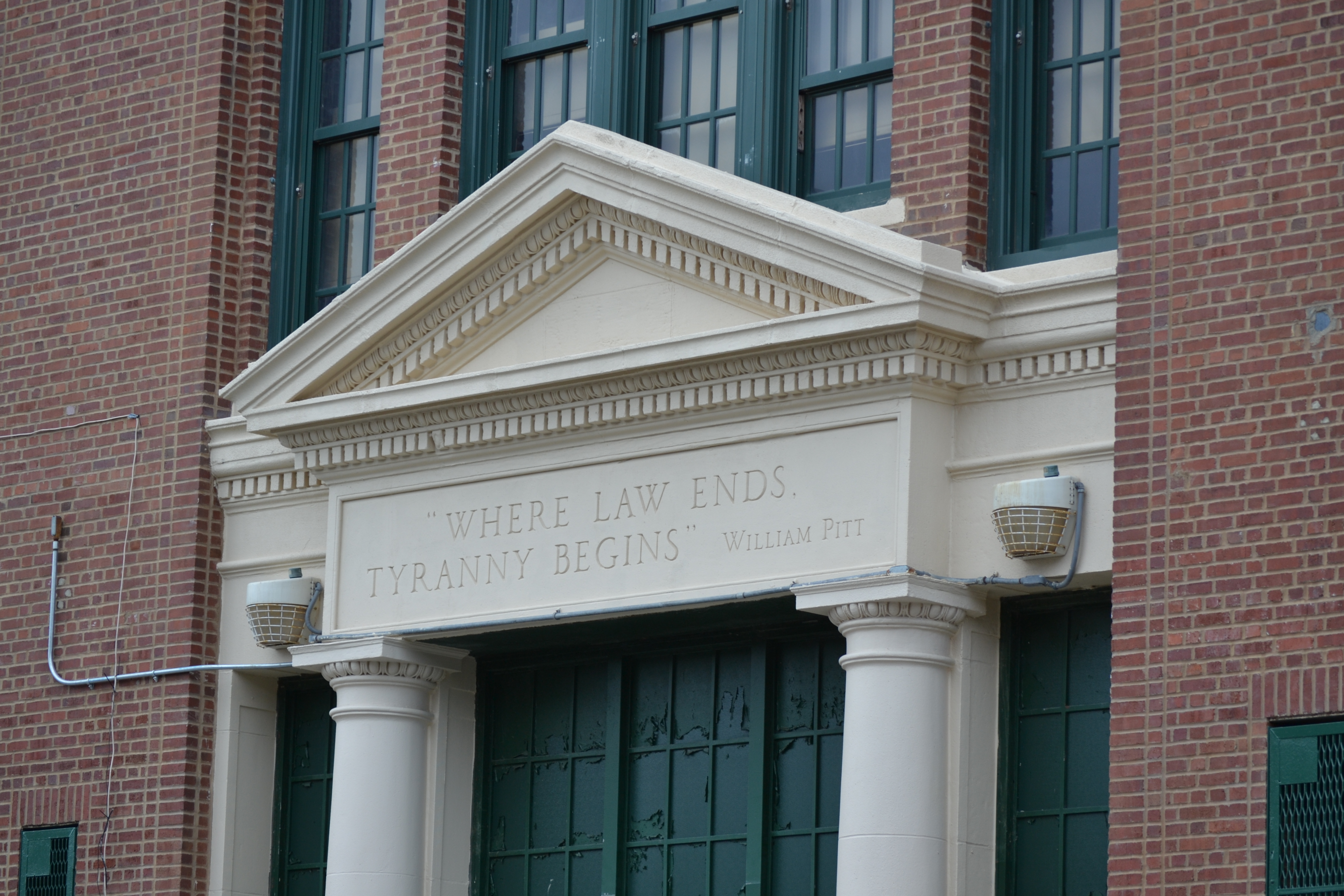
The entranceway of the
school, 2013

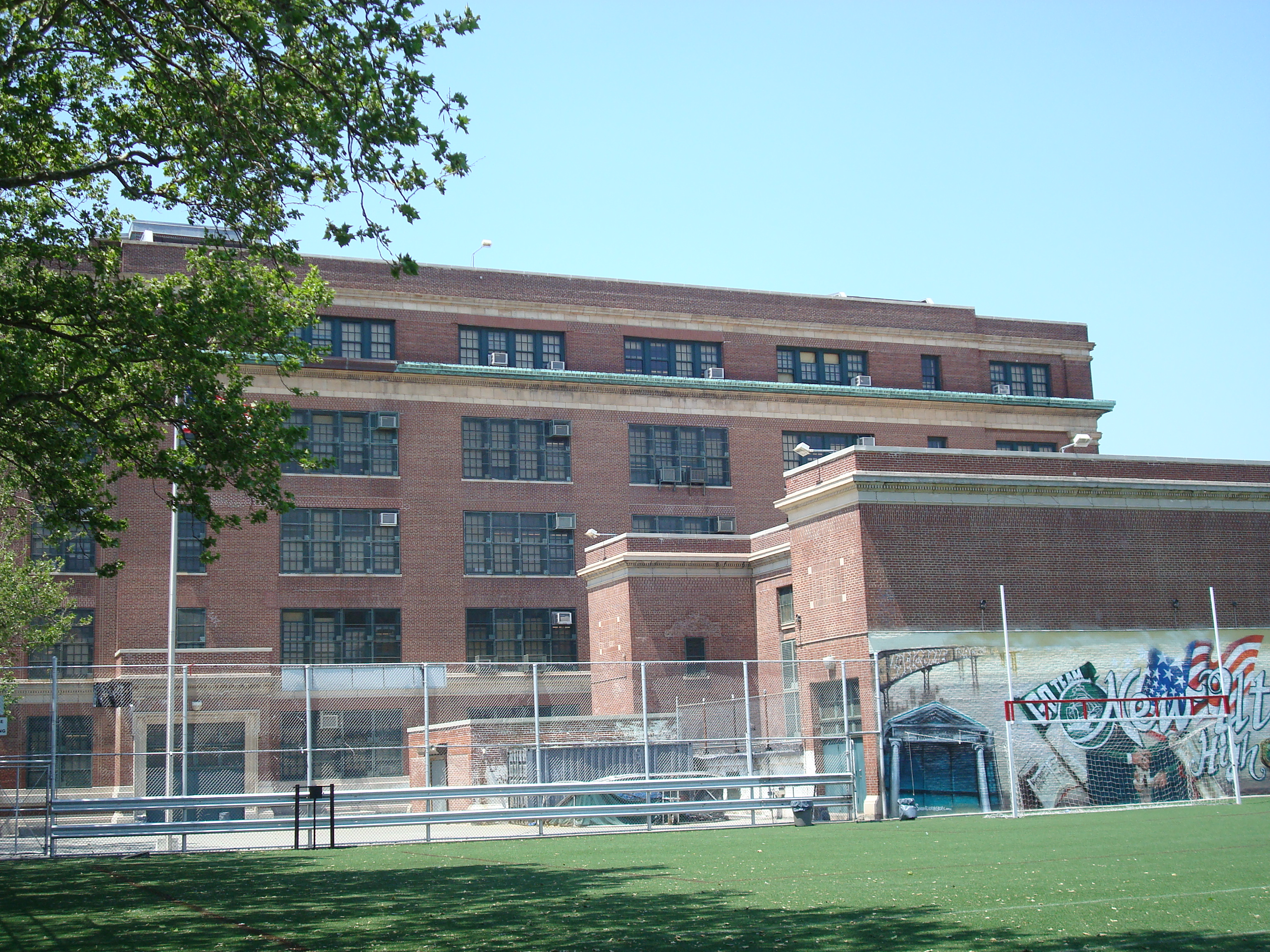
The rear of the school, 2013

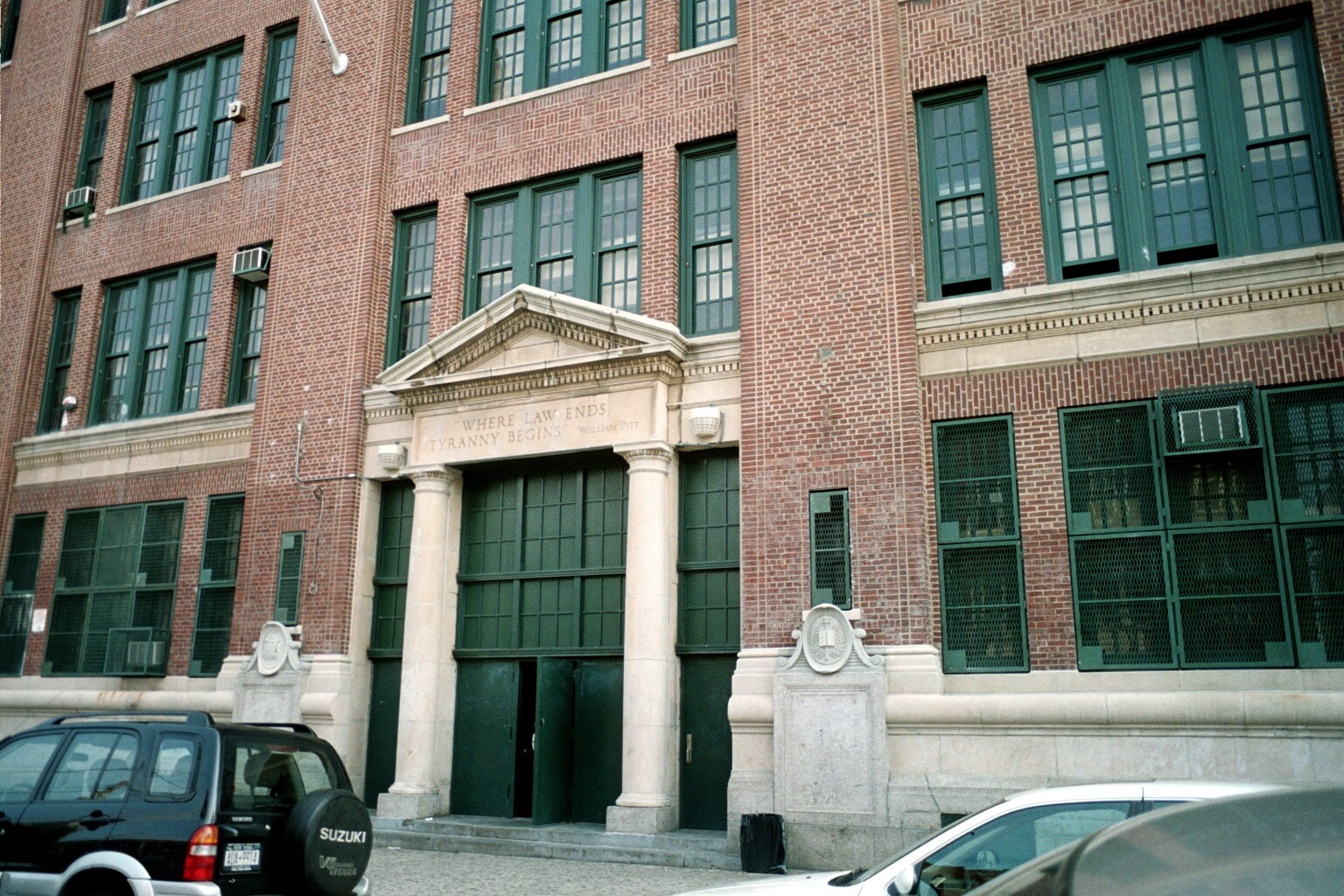
The school in 2003
