= Dilshad Najmuddin =

Pakistani civil servant

Dilshad Najmuddin (1933 – 18 May 2018) was a retired Inspector general of the Police Service of Pakistan. He was educated at the renowned Woodstock School near Mussorie, India, during the 1940s and later at the Forman Christian College, Lahore.

During the late 1980s, he also served as the Director of the Pakistan Narcotics Control Board (PNCB). After his retirement from the Pakistani Police, Dr. Najmuddin also served for some time as Pakistan's Ambassador to the Papal See from 1991 onwards.

He died at a hospital, in Islamabad, on 18 May 2018, following a brief illness.

Najmuddin belonged to the well-known Pakistani Christian Najmuddin family of Lahore, Pakistan who had run the renowned Joan McDonald schools system in Lahore and Islamabad, since 1921.

== See also ==
- Holy See-Pakistan relations
- Christianity in Pakistan
