= Victor Dorman =

American packaging executive

Victor Dorman (1915–1995) was an American packaging executive. He is credited with combining packaging processes that extended the shelf life of sliced cheese.

== Biography ==
Born in Bensonhurst, Brooklyn, Dorman attended New Utrecht High School. Later, he earned a bachelor's degree in business administration from New York University in the mid-1930s. During World War II, he served as an ensign in the U.S. Navy aboard a submarine chaser in the Pacific.

The Dorman Cheese Company, where Dorman eventually became chairman, was founded by his father, Nathan Dorman, a Lithuanian immigrant, in 1896. Initially a small-scale operation delivering cheese in Manhattan by horse-drawn wagon, the company expanded over the years. By the time it was sold to Beatrice Foods in 1986, it had established headquarters in Syosset, Long Island, a packaging plant in Monroe, Wisconsin, and distribution centers in Florida. Under Dorman's leadership, the company focused on the sale of various cheeses, including Swiss, Muenster, Edam, mozzarella, provolone, Jarlsberg, and Gouda.

In the late 1940s, with the rise of supermarkets, demand for pre-packaged cheese with longer shelf lives increased. This shift led to the introduction of the Flexvac 6-9 machine by the Standard Packaging Machine Company. This machine vacuum-packed cheese and introduced a small amount of nitrogen to extend shelf life and prevent mold growth. Concurrently, the United States Slicing Machine Company developed the interleaver, which automated the slicing of cheese and the placement of parchment paper between slices.

Dorman died in 1995.
