= Dorothy Riddle =

American psychologist

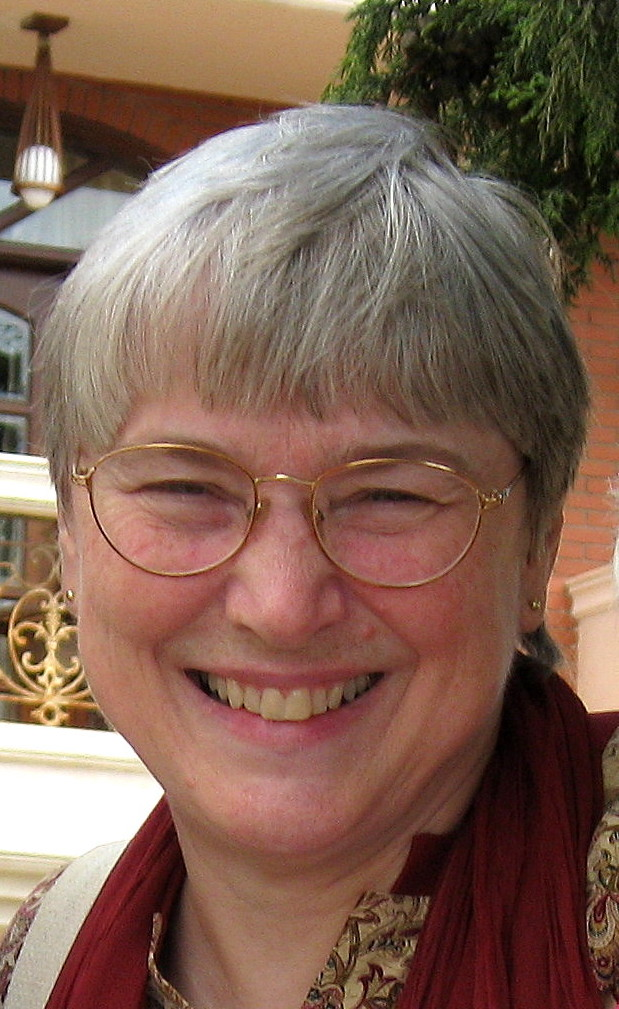
- Born: 12 January 1944 (age 82)
- Education: University of Colorado Boulder; Duke University; University of Arizona
- Known for: Riddle scale
- Scientific career
- Fields: Psychology, women's studies

Dorothy Riddle (born January 12, 1944) is an American-Canadian psychologist, feminist and economic development specialist. She is known as the author of the Riddle homophobia scale and published work on women's studies, homophobia, services and metaphysics.

== Biography ==
=== Early life ===
Dorothy Irene Riddle was born on January 12, 1944, in Chicago, United States.

With the establishment of the People's Republic of China on October 1, 1949, foreigners were forced to leave the country and the family moved to India as refugees. The early experience of poverty and social issues in China and India came to influence much of Riddle's studies and professional career in later years.

=== Education ===
Riddle started school in 1950 at Woodstock School, a boarding school in Mussoorie, Uttarakhand, India, where her grandfather, Allen Parker, had been principal. She graduated it as the valedictorian of her class in 1960 and moved back to United States to attend college.

Riddle studied psychology and philosophy at the University of Colorado Boulder and graduated with B.A., summa cum laude. She received a Ph.D. in clinical psychology, with a minor in statistics and research methodology, from Duke University in 1968 and a Master of Business Administration specializing in service industries from the University of Arizona in 1981.

=== Professional life ===
Dorothy Riddle's professional career has concentrated on the issues of feminism and women's studies, homosexuality and homophobia, and on services and economic development, focusing on the initiatives that empower disadvantaged groups and economies. She has also written extensively on metaphysics and spirituality.

==== Women's studies ====
After receiving her doctorate in 1968, Riddle had difficulty finding work in academia, as many universities at the time were not used to hiring women professors. Witnessing the injustice, Riddle became passionate about women's issues. She became a founding member of the Association for Women in Psychology, and introduced feminist analysis in the seminar 'Psychology of Social Issues' at the College of William and Mary where she was hired as an assistant professor of psychology. She traveled frequently to Washington, DC to lobby for the Equal Rights Amendment against discrimination based on person's sex or gender, and pressured the American Psychological Association to address women's issues fully by acting as the spokesperson of the Association of Women in Psychology. In 1969, after an Association for Women in Psychology group had worked on a series of demands, Riddle and Phyllis Chesler presented the demands at the annual meeting of the American Psychological Association. Chesler prepared a statement on the APA's obligations to women and demanded one million dollars in reparation for the damage psychology had perpetrated against allegedly mentally ill and traumatized women.

In the early 1970s, Riddle spoke and wrote on women's health, sexuality and sex roles and taught courses on these topics. In 1971, she launched the first BA-granting women's studies program at Richmond College (now the College of Staten Island, City University of New York (CUNY)) and was appointed to the first CUNY affirmative action committee.

She co-founded a feminist counseling service (Alternatives for Women) in 1973 in Tucson, Arizona where she conceptualized the empowerment model used in feminist therapy, and introduced the use of political analysis in psychotherapy.

In the 1990s, Riddle started to advocate for women business owners and helped to organize the first trade missions between Canada and the U.S. for women business owners. She is currently a Research Associate with the University of British Columbia Centre for Women's and Gender Studies where she continues to focus on women services business entrepreneurs.

==== Homophobia ====
In 1974, Dorothy Riddle was appointed to the American Psychological Association Task Force on the Status of Lesbian and Gay Male Psychologists, leading to APA's official statement in 1975 that homosexuality is not a mental disorder, and their condemnation of the conversion therapy to change a person's sexual orientation from homosexual to heterosexual. The APA's position paved the way for the official change in status of homosexuality from a psychiatric disorder to a lifestyle.

In parallel with her work on the APA Task Force on the Status of Lesbian and Gay Male Psychologists, Riddle developed a scale for measuring homophobia while a professor in the Psychology Department of the University of Arizona. The tool became known as the Riddle homophobia scale and was adopted by many organizations in anti-discriminatory training and for measuring changes in a range of other social attitudes as well.

Riddle showed in her studies that lesbians, gays and bisexuals have the potential to be positive role models of nontraditional gender roles, individual relationships and individual diversity, she investigated the psychological effects of negative self-image caused by society's stigmatization of homosexuality and the lack of same-sex support systems, and argued that lesbian patients need lesbian psychotherapists free from heterosexual bias to better understand their problems.

==== Services ====
In 1981, Riddle joined the faculty of the American Graduate School of International Management in Glendale, Arizona where she developed the first courses on international services trade and international services management.

In 1986, she published Service-Led Growth: The Role of the Service Sector in World Development, an analysis of the service sectors of 81 countries at four levels of development. It was the first major study to focus on the critical role of the service sector in economic development and has been widely credited for that.

=== Personal life ===
In 1993, Riddle immigrated to Canada.

== Recognition ==
Riddle is listed in the Who’s Who of American Women, the World Who’s Who of Women, and the International Who's Who of Professionals.

== See also ==
- Riddle scale
