= Bernice Gottlieb =

American interracial adoption activist (1931–2026)

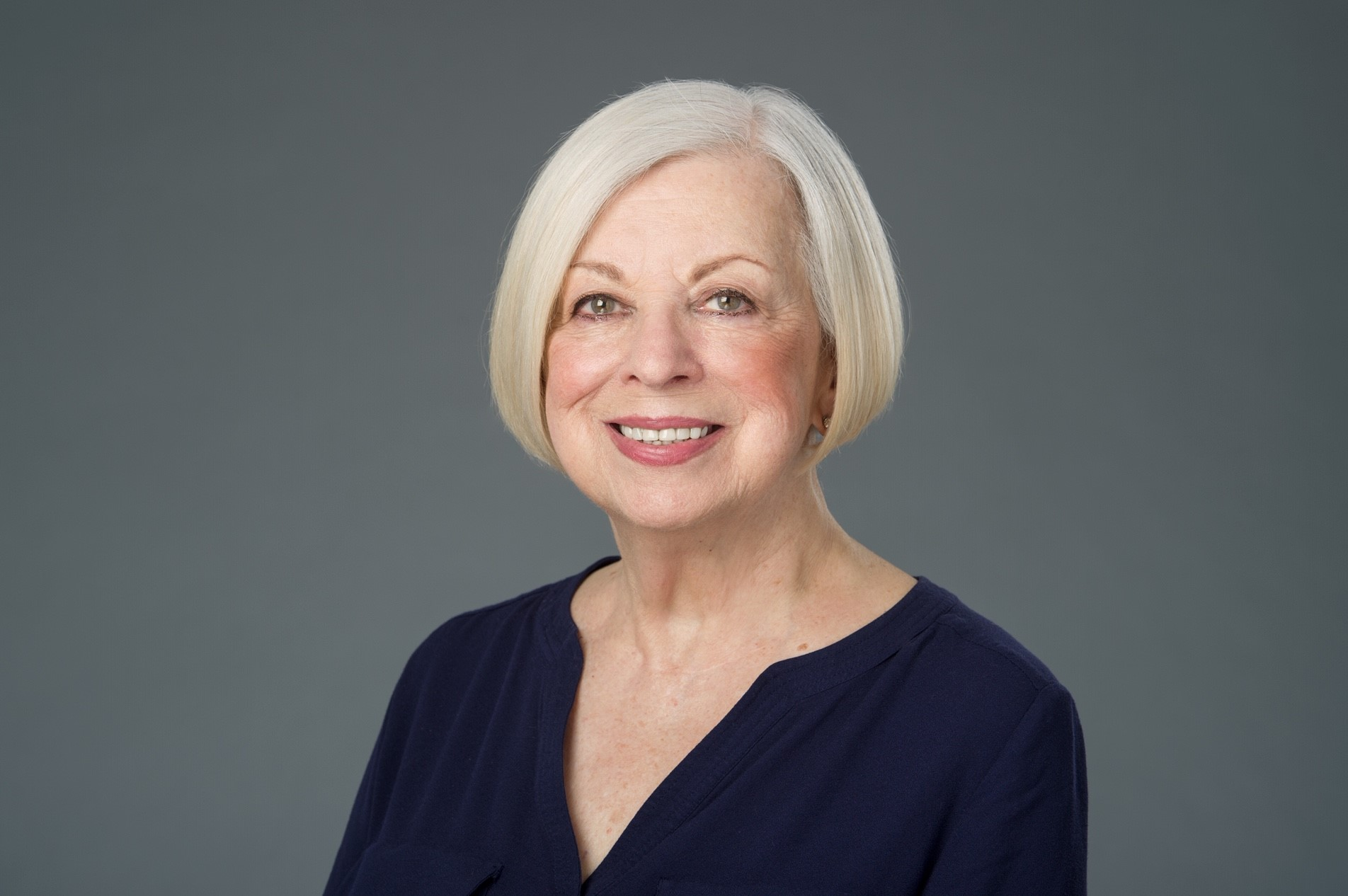
Gottlieb in 2016

Bernice Gottlieb (née Friedman, January 8, 1931 – August 25, 2026) was an American human rights advocate and pioneer in international adoption in the United States. In later years, she led a residential real estate firm and authored several books.

== Early years ==
Raised in Brooklyn, New York City, Gottlieb graduated from New Utrecht High School in 1949. She later married New York architect Ferdinand Gottlieb in 1953.

== Efforts in international adoption ==
In 1968, before adoption agencies in the northeast existed for the purpose, Gottlieb flew to South Korea in search of an orphaned child to adopt. In 1969, Gottlieb and her husband became one of the early American families of non-Asian heritage to adopt a Korean child, and the first from one of Korea's major orphanages.

Gottlieb's adoption of a daughter from Korea brought publicity to the cause of transracial adoptions and to her family. Over the next decade, Gottlieb would rise to national and global prominence as one of the leading authorities on international adoption.

== Efforts in Korea ==
In 1972, Gottlieb was approached by a Korean Roman Catholic priest, Rev. Alexander Lee (Korean name Lee Kyong-Jai), the administrator (from 1970 until his death in 1998) of a leprosy resettlement community, St. Lazarus Village, near Suwon, South Korea. Father Lee told Gottlieb of the significant stigma and isolation for those living in Korea with leprosy, also known as Hansen’s disease. Although the disease is treatable, "widespread misinformation about transmission" resulted in discrimination and quarantine. Children born to patients in a so-called "leper colony" were being denied basic human rights, including access to schooling.

From 1974 to 1976, while serving as director of Operation Outreach, as well as the New York State representative to the Committee of One Thousand, a 30,000-member group concerned with children in need, she succeeded in arranging for the unusual adoption of eight children born to patients in St. Lazarus Village who, according the program's sponsors, relinquished their children for adoption in the U.S. "so they may lead healthy, happy lives here, free of the 'untouchable' brand", as the New York Times put it. One of the parents of the original adoptive children said, "The future for them here is bleak. They must go. Me and my wife would like our misery to end with this generation."

In order to arrange these adoptions, Gottlieb lobbied Congress in 1976 to pass, for each child, a private bill to allow the unorphaned foreign-born children to emigrate to the United States for adoption by United States citizens.

The program was believed to be unprecedented in that the birth parents would retain a close connection with their biological children. These adoptions were part of a much broader public education campaign to dispel the deeprooted prejudices surrounding leprosy. Gottlieb's 2010 book, Take My Children, tells this story.

In later years, after she had left the field of adoption, Gottlieb was dismayed by reports of corrupt practices in South Korean international adoption, including the use of adoption to lower the country's social welfare costs, trafficking in stolen babies, coercion and false promises to mothers, and lying to adoptees about their origins. As of 2026, the South Korean government is phasing out international adoption.

== In India and United Nations ==
In late 1974, the Indian leprosy association, Hind Kusht Nivaran Sangh, contacted Gottlieb in an effort to extend the Outreach adoption program to children living in leprosy colonies in India. After Gottlieb visited the country on a tour of leprosy villages, the government of India approved the foreign adoption of up to 25 children born to leprosy patients. But Gottlieb found that the children in India lived under less restrictive circumstances than those faced by the Korean children in that they could attend local schools and were granted other basic rights if adequately supported from abroad. Instead of placing these children in adoptive homes, she established a fund to provide the children with uniforms and books, while continuing her public education efforts to combat the stigma associated with the disease.

In 1979, the International Year of the Child, Gottlieb authored and presented to the United Nations a research paper on "The Fact of Stigma", and a copy of the research is maintained in the archives of the Jimmy Carter Presidential Library.

== Following the Fall of Saigon ==
In late April, 1975, Gottlieb was contacted about a group of Vietnamese refugee children, among the last evacuated from Saigon, who were stranded in Guam without travel documents. Gottlieb was able to arrange their admission to the U.S., acting as personal sponsor to seven of them. She immediately set to work locating any living relatives and placed the majority, who were orphans, into new families. Among the group of seven she welcomed into her home, two young sisters remained as part of her family until their mother could be found and her release from Vietnam secured.

== Later efforts ==
Gottlieb retired from the adoption movement in the early 1980s, and was the principal for over twenty years of a residential real estate firm in Irvington, New York, Hudson Shores Realtors, before merging it into another firm.

In her retirement, she wrote several books, including two memoirs (Take my Children, OCLC 1525258069, and The Dove in the Tearoom, OCLC 945922703) and two novels featuring a crime-solving real estate agent (Havoc-on-Hudson, OCLC 945924072, and The House in the Cul-de-Sac , OCLC 1475439086).

In 1998, she was the recipient of the Ellis Island Medal of Honor.

== Death ==
Gottlieb died in Santa Monica, California, on August 25, 2026, at the age of 95.
