= Phyllis Chesler =

American feminist psychotherapist, professor, and author (born 1940)

- High school yearbook portrait, 1958
- Born: October 1, 1940 (age 86)
- Education: New Utrecht High School; Bard College; New School for Social Research
- Occupations: Psychotherapist; professor; author
- Notable work: Women and Madness (1972); With Child: A Diary of Motherhood (1979)

Phyllis Chesler (born October 1, 1940) is an American writer, psychotherapist, and professor emerita of psychology and women's studies at the College of Staten Island (CUNY). She is a second-wave feminist psychologist and the author of 20 books, including the best-sellers Women and Madness (1972), With Child: A Diary of Motherhood (1979), and An American Bride in Kabul: A Memoir (2013). Chesler has written extensively about topics such as gender, mental illness, divorce and child custody, surrogacy, second-wave feminism, pornography, prostitution, incest, and violence against women.

Chesler has written several works on subjects such as antisemitism, women in Islam, and honor killings. Chesler argues that many Western intellectuals, including leftists and feminists, have abandoned Western values in the name of multicultural relativism, and that this has led to an alliance with Islamists, an increase in antisemitism, and to the abandonment of Muslim women and religious minorities in Muslim-majority countries.

== Personal life ==
Chesler is the eldest of three children raised in a working-class Orthodox Jewish family in Brooklyn, New York. She attended Hebrew School from the age of six until she graduated from Marshalliah Hebrew High School, an after-school program for the study of Torah, at 14. As a youth, she was a member of the Socialist-Zionist youth movement HaShomer Hatzair, and later the even more radical left-wing Zionist youth movement Ain Harod. Despite her parents' disapproval, she continued to rebel against her religious upbringing.

She attended New Utrecht High School, where she was the editor of the yearbook and of the literary magazine. She won a full scholarship to Bard College, where she met Ali, a Westernized Muslim man from Afghanistan, the son of devout Muslim parents. They married in a civil ceremony in 1961 in New York State, and visited in Kabul, in the large, polygamous household of her father-in-law. She credits this experience with inspiring her to become an ardent feminist.

According to Chesler, her problems began on arrival in Afghanistan. Afghan authorities forced her to surrender her U.S. passport, and she ended up a virtual prisoner in her in-laws' house. Chesler describes this as how foreign wives were treated. This phenomenon has been documented by others. She reports that the U.S. embassy refused to help her leave the country. After five months, she contracted hepatitis and became gravely ill. At that point, her father-in-law agreed to allow her to return to the U.S. on a temporary visa.

Upon her return, she completed her final semester and graduated from Bard College, embarked on a doctoral program, worked in a brain research laboratory for E. Roy John, published studies in Science magazine and received a fellowship in neurophysiology at the New York Medical College at Flower Fifth Avenue Hospital. She later earned a Ph.D. in psychology in 1969 at the New School for Social Research and embarked on a career as a professor, author, and psychotherapist in private practice.

Chesler obtained an annulment from her first husband and married an Israeli-American, whom she also later divorced. She has one son. She describes their relationship, pregnancy, childbirth, and her first year as a mother in With Child: A Diary of Motherhood. In the 1998 edition, her son wrote the preface to the book.

== Career ==
=== Psychologist ===
In 1969, Chesler cofounded the Association for Women in Psychology. In 1972, she published Women and Madness, whose thesis is "that double standards of mental health and illness exist and that women are often punitively labeled as a function of gender, race, class, or sexual preference". The book sold more than 3 million copies worldwide. The book received a front page New York Times review by Adrienne Rich, who described it as "intense, rapid, brilliant, controversial ... a pioneer contribution to the feminization of psychiatric thinking and practice".

Chesler has been consulted by lawyers, psychologists and psychiatrists on diverse subjects including sex between patient and therapist, rape, incest, domestic violence, custody, honor killings, and the mistreatment of women in jails and in psychiatric institutions. For many years she maintained a small psychotherapy practice and in 1997 taught a course in Forensic Psychology at John Jay College. In 1997, she was the sole expert witness in a class action lawsuit in Nebraska on behalf of female psychiatric patients who had been sexually, physically, medically, and psychologically abused. In 1998, she taught a course in Advanced Psychology and Women's Studies at Brandeis University. From 2008 to 2012, Chesler submitted courtroom affidavits in cases where girls and women have fled being honor killed and applied for asylum in America.

=== Feminism ===
Chesler is considered a radical feminist and a second wave feminist leader. Chesler believes that men can and should be feminists, and she wrote in her book Letters to a Young Feminist that she envisions her heirs as both women and men. Chesler has studied male psychology and published a book on the subject (About Men) which discussed the father-son, mother-son, and brother-brother relationships; the book also tried to understand male conformity, how and why men obeyed the orders of male tyrants, and what kind of men resisted doing so.

Chesler taught one of the first Women's Studies classes in the U.S. at Richmond College (which later merged with Staten Island Community College to form the College of Staten Island) in New York City during the 1969–1970 school year. She turned the Women's Studies course into a minor and then a major at the university. With Vivian Gornick, she created an early feminist salon. In 1975, she co-led one of the first feminist Passover seders and continued to do so for 18 years. During her time at Richmond College, she established many services for female students, including self-defense classes, a rape crisis center, and a child care center. She was also a leader in the class action lawsuit against CUNY on behalf of women which took 17 years to be resolved. In 1975, she became one of five cofounders of The National Women's Health Network, with Barbara Seaman, Alice Wolfson, Belita Cowan, and Mary Howell, and is a charter member of the Women's Forum and a founding member of the International Committee for Women of the Wall.

In 1969, Chesler, together with others, co-founded the Association for Women in Psychology. With Dr. Dorothy Riddle, Chesler presented a series of demands at the 1969 annual meeting of the American Psychological Association, demands which an Association for Women in Psychology group had worked on together. Chesler prepared a statement on the APA's obligations to women and demanded one million dollars in reparation for the damage psychology had perpetrated against allegedly mentally ill and traumatized women.

In her early work, although Chesler argued for integration, she also stated in 1972 that "feminists" and feminist values must gradually and ultimately dominate public social institutions—in order to insure that they are not used against women", and argued that there has always been "a war between the sexes". In 1977, Chesler became an associate of the Women's Institute for Freedom of the Press. Chesler worked for the United Nations (1979–1980) and coordinated an international feminist conference that took place in Oslo, just prior to the 1980 UN conference on women.

In 1986, Chesler co-organized a speakout about mothers losing custody of children at the John Jay College of Criminal Justice in New York. Nearly 500 custodially embattled mothers and speakers attended, including Ti-Grace Atkinson, E.M. Broner, Paula Caplan, Toi Derricotte, Andrea Dworkin, and Kate Millett. New York State and national legislators and feminist leaders participated. Also in 1986, Chesler co-organized a congressional press briefing in Washington, D.C., on mothers and child custody. It was sponsored by then-Representatives Charles Schumer (D-NY) and Barbara Boxer (D-CA). Some of the mothers she interviewed for her 1986 book Mothers on Trial spoke at the briefing.

In 1987, Chesler worked with Mary Beth Whitehead's lawyer Harold Cassidy in the landmark Baby M case, in which the New Jersey Supreme Court declared that surrogacy contracts violated New Jersey law. Chesler organized demonstrations outside the courthouse, wrote articles, created an alliance of diverse groups, and ultimately documented this struggle and the issues raised by a surrogacy contract custody battle in Sacred Bond: The Legacy of Baby M. In 1989, Chesler began publishing in On the Issues magazine and also functioned as its Editor-at-Large. She did so for fifteen years until the magazine became an online edition.

In 1990–1991, Chesler organized expert witnesses in the case of Aileen Wuornos, a female serial killer. Chesler's stated goal was to educate the jury and the country about the lives of women in prostitution and the dangerous conditions they routinely face. The public defender did not call any of these witnesses, which became one of the grounds of the appeal that Wuornos' lawyers launched in the Florida Supreme Court. Chesler wrote about the legal and psychiatric issues raised by the case in The New York Times and St. John's Law Review and the Criminal Practice Law Report.

=== Views of women and Judaism ===
In 1976, the first feminist Passover seder in North America was held in Chesler's New York City apartment and led by Broner, with 13 women attending, including Chesler. Chesler also created and participated in Jewish feminist life cycle rituals.

In 1988, Chesler was among the women who prayed with a Torah for the first time in an all-female, multi-denominational, non-minyan group at the Western Wall in Jerusalem. In 1989, Chesler co-founded the International Committee for Women of the Wall to promote the religious rights of Jewish women in Jerusalem; she became one of the name plaintiffs in a lawsuit against the state of Israel on this issue. In 2002, she and co-author Rivka Haut both edited and contributed to an anthology on this subject. In 1989, Chesler began to study Torah. She published her first dvar Torah (Bible interpretation) in 2000.

=== Activist against racism and antisemitism ===
In the 1960s, Chesler was active in the Northern Student Movement. Chesler has written about the participation of African-American women in the American civil rights movement in the 1960s, and was interviewed on camera in a documentary about Viola Liuzzo, a white female civil rights activist who was murdered by Ku Klux Klan members. In 1973, Chesler co-organized the first press conference about feminism and antisemitism, and in 1974–1975, she co-organized the first Jewish feminist speakout in New York City. In 1981, Chesler organized the first-ever panel on racism, antisemitism, and feminism for the National Women's Studies Association in Storrs, Connecticut.

In 2013, Chesler was appointed a Fellow of the Middle East Forum.

== Book summaries ==
=== Women and Madness (1972) ===
Women and Madness is now considered a classic work. The poet and essayist Adrienne Rich's front-page review in The New York Times (cited above) was a first of its kind for a feminist work. When it first appeared, at least one critic viewed the work as "radical" and "overstated". Other reviews were more positive. The Saturday Review opined that "this is an extremely important book, a signal that the women's liberation movement is coming of age ... she writes with high passion and compassion". The Los Angeles Times described it as a "stunning book ... fascinating and important to every woman"; The Boston Phoenix viewed the book as "an extensively researched and deeply intuitive exploration of woman's psychic experience ... invaluable". When the book was translated into European languages, many reviews appeared. In his review for Le Monde, Roland Jaccard wrote that "like any important book, Women and Madness has the immense merit of 'troubling the world's sleep.'"

=== Women, Money and Power (co-authored with Emily Jane Goodman) (1976) ===
The book is an in-depth study of gender-based economic disparities in America in the 1970s. The New York Times gave it a mixed review but described it as "useful not only for its theoretical insights but for its presentation of a number of practical items". Kirkus called it "caustic and abrasive" but also "impressively researched ... one of the more challenging works to come out of the women's movement".

=== About Men (1978) ===
About Men describes the relationships between brothers, sons and fathers, and sons and mothers. When it was published in 1978, the book was described as "psychologically voluptuous, it plunges through the bloody underbrush of male-male relationships ... insisting that we look at men with fresh and fearless eyes". John Leonard of The New York Times wrote that Chesler "has written a brave, sad, disorderly, sometimes self-indulgent, often infuriating, always provocative book."

=== With Child: A Diary of Motherhood (1979) ===
Chesler was one of only a small number of second-wave feminists to focus on motherhood. In With Child: A Diary of Motherhood, Chesler explored the experience of pregnancy, childbirth, and the first year of "newborn" motherhood in psychological, spiritual, and mythic terms. The book was endorsed by both men (Alan Alda, Gerold Frank) and women (Judy Collins, Tillie Olsen, Marilyn French). It was also reviewed in the mainstream media. Caroline Seebohm of The New York Times noted that this book stood out because it was written by a radical feminist, and describes it as "a nice mixture of romantic charm and intellectual insight." In 1998, Chesler's eighteen-year-old son wrote a new introduction to the book.

=== Sacred Bond: The Legacy of Baby M (1988) ===
Sacred Bond discussed the issues raised by the high-profile Baby M case, in which surrogacy was ultimately declared illegal in the state of New Jersey. Despite liberal feminist opposition, Chesler defended the rights of the birth mother, Mary Beth Whitehead, who wanted to keep her child even though the genetic father and his wife were a more educated and higher income couple.

The New York Times described this book as "a powerful critique of the way many of us were inclined to think". A Los Angeles Times reviewer wrote that Sacred Bond is "a powerful, provocative book ... illustrating social problems sure to remain controversial". The book and its views were also condemned by pro-surrogacy lobbies, pro-adoption lobbies, and by feminists who were concerned with maximizing their options in case of infertility. This issue remains timely and is frequently in the news.

=== Patriarchy: Notes of an Expert Witness (1994) ===
This volume consists of several articles written by Chesler on topics such as the Aileen Wuornos, Baby M, child abuse, treatment of women in mental health institutions, and patriarchy. It also includes a critique of Naomi Wolf's book Fire with Fire.

=== Letters to a Young Feminist (1998) ===
In 1998, Chesler wrote a "legacy" letter. She wanted to share the history of her generation of feminists with coming generations and to point to work still left undone. The work was lauded by feminists of her era and mocked or minimized by daughter-generation feminists who did not want to keep standing on the shoulders of a previous generation with whom they disagreed and with whom they were in competition.

The New York Times felt much of the advice was unnecessary since "Feminism's daughters have outgrown their bunk beds". The reviewer found the book "strident" and fails to reach younger feminists but concedes that "Chesler does an admirable job. She writes poignantly of the way in which her generation was eerily silent about woman-hating among women, including among feminists. She implores readers to adopt a more global perspective on women's rights." Salon noted that "the book mostly seemed to piss off its intended audience."

Nevertheless, reviews from feminists of her own generation were more positive. Gloria Steinem endorsed the book and found it a "warm, personal, political, irresistible guide for young feminists, women and men."

=== Woman's Inhumanity to Woman (2002) ===
This pioneering book addressed the subject of female indirect aggression, both in the family and the workplace, both in childhood and adulthood, and covered woman's capacity for cruelty, competition, envy, and ostracism; the ways in which women, like men, have internalized sexist beliefs; and the importance of acknowledging the "shadow side" of female-female relationships, especially because such relationships are so important to women. The book was reviewed in many publications, and the author was interviewed widely in South America, North America (including in The New York Times), Europe, and Asia. It received a front-page review in the Washington Post Book World written by Deborah Tannen. Tannen wrote: "Chesler seems to have read everything and thought deeply about it ... Along with social commentary and psychological insight, Chesler offers astute literary criticism ... many of Chesler's richest scenarios are drawn from the more than 500 interviews she conducted ... many of Chesler's examples have an unmistakable and heartbreaking ring of familiarity. The time has come to stop idealizing or demonizing either sex. Seeing women, like men, as capable of both courage and jealousy, of providing care, and causing pain, is no more nor less than acknowledging women as fully human."

In addition, the book was reviewed in Salon, Publishers Weekly, and Kirkus Reviews.

=== The New Anti-Semitism (2003) ===
Chesler's The New Anti-Semitism: The Current Crisis and What We Must Do About It was issued in 2003. The book received positive notices from a range of reviewers including former Prisoner of Zion and author Natan Sharansky, British Chief Rabbi Lord Jonathan Sacks, novelist Erica Jong and lawyers Alan Dershowitz and Jay Lefkowitz. Sharansky praised the book as "authoritative" and "sensitive", and added "anyone who wants to understand the connection between anti-Semitism, Islamic terrorism, the role of propaganda and appeasement must read this book." Sacks added "I admire the courage of this vision and the power of the writing."

Historian Paul Johnson also praised the book as "impassioned, highly readable and often painful." It "show(s) how closely connected is hatred of Jews to its psychological twin, anti-Americanism. Anti-Semitism is now striking roots in the campus again, in the guise of political correctness—and ironically—anti-racism. (This) book reminds us how hard civilized people need to fight against it."

Some reviews were more critical. A 2003 review in Publishers Weekly argued that the book "too often undercuts itself when its author intends to be provocative", citing lines such as "African-Americans (not Jews) are the Jews in America but Jews are the world's niggers." The review piece concluded that "Chesler's tone and lack of intellectual rigor will not help her ideas to be heard by those who do not already agree with her."

=== The Death of Feminism (2005) ===
In The Death of Feminism: What's Next in the Struggle for Women's Freedom, Chesler documented how western academic and activist feminists came to abandon their former concepts of universal human rights for everyone and became multicultural relativists. She argues that their desire to avoid being labeled "racists" or "Islamophobes" eventually trumped their concern with women's and human rights in the Third World. The Death of Feminism was excerpted in Playboy magazine, but she was also interviewed by The Washington Times, and positively reviewed in the pages of The Weekly Standard and The National Review.

Kirkus called it a "loud wake up call ... a fierce polemic, filled with vigorous arguments and distressing human stories". Publishers Weekly wrote: "She has penned a cross between a cri de coeur and a deeply rhetorical polemic that makes scores of provocative points. ... As in her last book, The New Anti-Semitism Chesler raised important issues, but her style will alienate the very people she means to reach." However, leading Second Wave feminist Kate Millett, who wrote Sexual Politics, Flying, and Going to Iran, praised The Death of Feminism: "In telling her story she is sounding a warning to the West that it ignores to its peril." Lawyer Alan Dershowitz called the work "a tour de force ... a must read".

She was also interviewed about the book in the Chicago Tribune. and London Guardian. In 2006, Chesler participated at the First Muslim Dissident Conference in St. Petersburg, Florida, which she covered for the Times of London.

=== Mothers on Trial: The Battle for Children and Custody (2011) ===
In 2011, Chicago Review Press published a 25th anniversary edition of Chesler's 1986 book Mothers on Trial: The Battle for Children and Custody, in which she argues that the American legal system is biased and overworked and continues to fail the needs of mothers and children, especially those whose husbands and fathers are violent and vindictive. She discusses topics such as prolonged litigation, joint custody, court enabled incest, brainwashing, kidnapping, gay and lesbian custody, fathers' rights groups, and international child custody laws. The new edition includes a new introduction and eight new chapters. The new edition received favorable notices from the Library Journal and Kirkus Reviews.

=== An American Bride in Kabul: A Memoir (2013) ===
An account of her 1961 marriage to an Afghan man, her brief married life in a harem in Afghanistan, and the lifelong lessons she learned. The book uses material from diaries, letters, and interviews spanning a fifty-year period to describe this ill-fated relationship and the experiences that Chesler believes forged her feminism. American Bride in Kabul won a National Jewish Book Award for 2013.

=== Islamic Gender Apartheid: Exposing a Veiled War Against Women (2017) ===
The book is composed of a number of articles which Chesler wrote during the period 2003–2016. Some concern specific issues while other have their roots in speeches at conferences or government events. The main theme is Islamic gender segregation.

This volume covers a variety of topics facing women in the Muslim world including the burqa and face veil, child marriage, polygamy, honor-based violence, female genital mutilation (FGM), state-sponsored and vigilante attacks (including stoning and disfiguring women by throwing acid in their faces), forced female suicide killers, and other injustices that have been minimized or denied by Western media and governments. In the book, Chesler points out that many other feminists have ignored or refused to concern themselves with these issues and encourages American women to oppose the gender segregation of Muslim women as it threatens their own freedom as well.

The New English Review described the book as "in the same league as other courageous writers, Ayaan Hirsi Ali ... important for US policy makers as well as for other feminists."

=== A Family Conspiracy: Honor Killing (2018) ===
By 2003, Chesler had started to write about honor killings based on newspaper accounts, sources available online, interviews and memoirs and later produced a number of academic studies on honor killings in the West, the Middle East and South Asia. The studies along with more than 90 articles are collected in the book.

Chesler distinguishes honor killings from homicides, domestic violence and crimes of passion in that honor killings are carried out by a family due to their perception of a woman having brought public dishonor. In the book, the empirical evidence leads Chesler to conclude that the origins of honor killings are more likely to reside in tribalism rather than any single religion. Simultaneously, Chesler holds Islam, Hinduism and Sikhism responsible for failing to abolish or to even try to abolish honor killings and femicides. For example, in Pakistan, a Muslim country, Chesler notes that religious authorities do not condemn honor killings.

Chesler describes this book as the work of "an academic-turned-frontline-reporter." the murder of girls and women accused or suspected of any disapproved activity (refusing an arranged marriage, refusing to veil, insisting on an education, leaving a violent marriage, having infidel friends, talking to boys or sexual activity outside marriage (including rape)).

The "crimes" Chesler cites that have resulted in honor killing also include wanting to marry the "wrong" man in terms of caste, class, or religious sect, or leaving one's religion.

"Being born female in a shame-and-honor culture is, potentially, a capital crime; every girl has to keep proving that she is not dishonoring her family; even so, an innocent girl can be falsely accused and killed on the spot. ... Her virginity belongs to her family and is a token of their honor. If she is not a virgin, the shame belongs to her family and they must cleanse themselves of it with blood; her blood", she writes.

=== A Politically Incorrect Feminist (2018) ===
In A Politically Incorrect Feminist (2018), Chesler discusses the women who fought for women's rights and inspired others to do so.

In a review for Los Angeles Review of Books, Miriam Greenspan writes, "Chesler's genius is her refusal to submit to tribalism. In recounting harsh truths about feminist leaders, whom she takes to task for promulgating herd thinking or abandoning their values for the sake of political expediency, she shows how even the most progressive social justice movements can sometimes betray their own best ideals. Her memoir is a cautionary tale for today's social activists, who tend to be largely ignorant of the disappeared history of the woman's movement and are thus repeating some of its mistakes. Those who would continue the struggle for social justice would do well to read this book and take its hard-earned lessons to heart.”

=== Requiem for a Female Serial Killer (2020) ===
This book chronicles the crimes of Aileen Wuornos, America's so-called first female serial killer, Chesler's involvement with her case, and with Wuornos's trials and eventual execution. It is a genre-blended true-crime narrative, both fictional and non-fictional and sees events through Wuornos's eyes. She also profiles the way in which Wuornos is a unique serial killer. Requiem portrays prostitution as the greatest form of violence against women and discusses whether every woman, including a prostitute, has the right to defend herself. Chesler discusses the racism, sexism, and the nature of justice/injustice in north-central Florida and the feminist involvement in the case.

Requiem has been endorsed by Gloria Steinem, who wrote "We finally have begun to recognize women as victims—but why the silence when women fight back?" Alan Dershowitz praised the book, "If you love true crime thrillers, as I do, you must read Requiem with its feminist psychological twist. You won't be able to put it down. Chesler, an eminent psychologist, gets inside the mind of a unique female serial killer. FBI profilers should be ordering their copies right now."

== Critique of Islam ==
On December 14, 2005, Chesler delivered a presentation before a United States Senate committee entitled, "Gender Apartheid in Iran and the Muslim World". She called for the U.S. government to oppose what she described as "Islamic gender apartheid", and to support the rights of women living in fundamentalist Islamic regimes. "If we do not oppose and defeat Islamic gender apartheid, democracy and freedom cannot flourish in the Arab and Islamic world", she said. "If we do not join forces with Muslim dissident and feminist groups, and, above all, if we do not have one universal standard of human rights for all—then we will fail our own Judeo-Christian and secular Western ideals." She also told the committee that her experience in Afghanistan taught her "the necessity of applying a single standard of human rights, not one tailored to each culture".

Chesler made statements critical of Islam in the context of the Israeli–Palestinian conflict in a 2007 interview with The Jewish Press. She was quoted as saying, "It's easy to say, yes, the Muslims are against everyone who is not a Muslim. And it's true. That's part of what jihad is about, that's part of the history of Islam. [...] Here's the thing. The West, and that means Jews and Israelis, would like to lead sweet and peaceful lives. We're up against an enemy now that is dying to kill us, that lives to kill, and that at best merely wishes to impose on the rest of us its laws and strictures."

She has cited Bat Ye'or's Eurabia thesis as a warning to the West, and has been described as part of the counter-jihad movement.

=== Honor-related violence and honor killings ===
Chesler published four studies about honor killings in the American journal Middle East Quarterly in 2009, 2010, 2012 and 2015. In one such essay, she wrote that 91% of the total worldwide cases of honour killings (as reported in English-language media) were Muslim-on-Muslim crimes, including those committed in North America and Europe. Based on these sources, Chesler concluded that "there are at least two types of honor killings and two victim populations". She identified the first group as consisting of daughters with an average age of seventeen who were killed by their families, and the second group as consisting of women with an average age of thirty-six. In her most recent essay, Chesler asserts that both Hindus and Muslims commit honor killings, but that only Muslims do so worldwide.

Chesler argues that honor killings differ qualitatively from Western domestic femicide. She has acknowledged that "many honorable feminists" disagree with this position, writing that "understandably, such feminists fear singling out one group for behavior that may be common to all groups". Chesler's position is that perpetrators of domestically violent femicide are regarded as criminals in the west, but that the same stigma does not attach to honor killings in other societies.

As a result of her observations about Islam and honor killing, Muslim and left-wing activists successfully lobbied the University of Arkansas to remove Chesler from an academic conference on honor killing because they did not approve of her coverage of the subject. In an address before the New York County Supreme Court, Chesler reported that she has submitted affidavits on behalf of Muslim women and converts from Islam who she contends believed themselves to be in danger of being the victims of honor killing, and who sought asylum and citizenship in the United States.

=== Burqas ===
In 2010, Chesler published an essay in Middle East Quarterly calling for the burqa to be banned in western countries. She argued in defense of this position that despite the Qur'an's command to both men and women to dress "modestly", several Muslim-majority countries have, in the past, banned the full burqa or niqab. She argued that the overwhelming majority of Muslim countries do not require that women wear a face veil and noted that the burqa can function as a "sensory deprivation and isolation chamber."

In addition, Chesler has written that she is not opposed to the Islamic veil (hijab, headscarf) because it does not obscure a woman's facial identity. However, she also notes that there is a connection between a range of physical and psychiatric illnesses associated with forced veiling; these include the visible subordination of women, as well as the obvious lack of sunlight. However, she has also said she is not opposed to the Islamic headscarf (hijab).

=== Other ===
Chesler began writing about rape, incest, sexual harassment, and domestic violence during the late 1960s. Her focus has mainly been on Western countries, but with the rise of Islamic fundamentalism, terrorism, and gender apartheid, and the Islamist persecution of women and infidels, Chesler began to explore similar themes in Muslim-majority countries. She has argued, in a paraphrase of Nancy Kobrin, that some suicide bombers may be unconsciously acting out their hatred of women in committing violent acts. A 2006 review in the Toronto Star described Chesler's views on this subject as "compelling, if strident".

Muslim feminists and dissidents such as Ibn Warraq, Amir Taheri and Farzana Hassan have lauded Chesler's work in this area as ground-breaking and truthful. Ibn Warraq has praised Chesler's "great service in presenting the fruit of her sober research."

In a separate article, Hassan praised Chesler's memoir An American Bride in Kabul as a "poignant and fascinating account has many lessons for women -- and men -- of all cultures."

== Recent activities ==
In recent years, Chesler has sparked controversy, both for her work on honor-based violence, including honor killing, and for her outspoken criticism of anti-Jewish racism. Beginning in the 1990s Chesler has authored six books about the failures of Western feminism, antisemitism, Islamic gender and religious apartheid and honor killing and has criticized Western feminists for failing to defend women in non-Western societies.

Her work on these topics has sparked backlash. In April, 2017 Chesler's keynote address to a conference on honor-based violence at the University of Arkansas Law School was cancelled. The controversy was written about widely on social media, and Dr. Chesler was almost immediately invited by a group of grassroots activists at University College London to address a conference at that institution in November 2017.

Also in 2017, Taylor & Francis declined to publish her two volumes in this area, New English Review Press immediately agreed to do so. In the fall of 2017, they published Islamic Gender Apartheid: Exposing a Veiled War Against Women with a new introduction. The original introduction appeared at Tablet, Middle East Forum, and Mosaic.

At the same time, Chesler has received accolades from Islamic feminist organizations. In 2018, she received a "True Honor" award from the Iranian and Kurdish Women's Rights Organization (IKWRO) at a ceremony in London. The same year, she selected, edited, and newly introduced her volume A Family Conspiracy: Honor Killing (April 2018). It was translated into German by Henryk M. Broder's group and posted at his blog Die Achse des Guten.

A major interview with Dr. Chesler appeared in EMMA, a German feminist magazine.

In addition, from 2012 to 2020 Chesler submitted courtroom affidavits to support asylum applications for girls and women at risk of honor-based violence in their countries of origin.

In a 2021 article for Tablet titled "The Progressive Erasure of Feminism," Chesler wrote that the Equality Act would "dangerously privilege a minority over the majority by endangering women's sex-based rights in terms of sports, and women-only safe spaces in prisons, DV and homeless shelters, and in the military."

== Books ==
- Women and Madness (1972 and revised 2005)
- Women, Money and Power (1976)
- About Men (1979)
- With Child: A Diary of Motherhood (1979)
- Mothers on Trial: The Battle for Children and Custody (1986)
- Sacred Bond: The Legacy of Baby M (1988)
- Patriarchy: Notes of an Expert Witness (1994)
- Feminist Foremothers in Women's Studies, Psychology, and Mental Health (1995)
- Letters to a Young Feminist (1997)
- Woman's Inhumanity to Woman (2002)
- Women of the Wall: Claiming Sacred Ground at Judaism's Holy Site (2002)
- The New Anti-Semitism. The Current Crisis and What We Must Do About It (2003)
- The Death of Feminism: What's Next in the Struggle For Women's Freedom (2005)
- Mothers on Trial: The Battle for Children and Custody (25th Anniversary Edition) (2011)
- An American Bride in Kabul: A Memoir (2013)
- Living History: On the Front Lines for Israel and the Jews: 2003–2015 (2015)
- Islamic Gender Apartheid. A Veiled War Against Women (2017)
- A Family Conspiracy: Honor Killing (2018)
- A Politically Incorrect Feminist: Creating a Movement with Bitches, Lunatics, Dykes, Prodigies, Warriors, and Wonder Women (2018)
- Requiem for a Female Serial Killer (2020)

== See also ==
- Aurora Nilsson, a Swedish woman with similar experiences as a wife of an Afghan man in Kabul in the 1920s, who also wrote about her experiences.
