= Montjoie Saint Denis! =

Battle-cry and motto of the Kingdom of France

Coat of arms of the Kingdom of France with the royal motto and war cry: "Montjoie Saint-Denis!"

Montjoie! Saint Denis! (Note: Also known in minor variants such as Montjoye-Saint-Denis, and in French often written emphasizing its exclamation as "Montjoie ! Saint Denis !".) (French pronunciation: [mɔ̃tʒwa sɛ̃ dəni]) was the battle cry and motto of the Kingdom of France. It allegedly refers to Charlemagne's legendary banner, the Oriflamme, which was also known as the "Montjoie" and was kept at the Abbey of Saint Denis, though alternative explanations exist. The battle-cry was first known to be used during the 12th century reign of Louis VI of France, the first royal bearer of the Oriflamme.

== Etymological theories ==
Whilst "Saint Denis" undoubtedly refers to the ancient Saint Denis of Paris, the etymology of the term "Montjoie" is overall uncertain. It is first attested in The Song of Roland (12th century). The Catholic Encyclopedia suggested it originated in a term for marking stones or cairns set up on the roadside – in Late Latin known as mons Jovis – which from c. 1200 in French appears as monjoie. According to the Encyclopedia, cairns were used by warriors as gathering places, and the term was applied to the Oriflamme by the analogy that it was a place warriors gathered for combat. "Montjoie" has also been proposed as being derived from a Common Germanic phrase, *mund gawi ("pile of stones"), (Note: The asterisk * used throughout signifies the standard symbol of terms created by linguistic reconstruction.) supposedly used as a battle cry in a sense like "hold the line!". It has alternatively been proposed as deriving from *mund galga, from mund ("protect") and galga ("cross, rood") (as pilgrims would often affix crucifixes to these stones). Charles Arnould claimed the word originated in Gaulish *mant- ("path") and *gauda ("pile of stones").

Additional etymological theories exist which do not connect the term "montjoie" to the traditional explanation of the Oriflamme. Henri Diament believed it was in reference of the martyrdom of Saint Denis of Paris, which he claimed was associated with a Mons Jovis or Mons Gaudii ("Mountain of Joy"). However this connection is unexplained, as the name of the place of St. Denis' martyrdom, Montmartre, originated from Mons Martis rather than Mons Jovis. A connection to Montmartre is re-affirmed by G. Bugler, who believed the "joie" came from a cognate of "Gau", or region, presumably translating the phrase as "the place of the hill of St. Denis". Laura Hibbard Loomis believed the phrase to have originated from "meum gaudium" (my joy). This alternative Latin etymology is given by Gerhard Rohlfs, who connected it to "Mons Gaudii", a name given by medieval pilgrims to a point where one would get their first glimpse of their destination.

== Contemporary usage ==
The term has been sometimes associated with the royalist right-wing in France. In June 2021, French president Emmanuel Macron was slapped in the face by a man who shouted the motto. French legislator Éric Coquerel stated that the perpetrators of a 2018 pie attack against him, associated with Action Française, had also used the phrase.

== See also ==
- "Liberté, égalité, fraternité" ("Liberty, equality, fraternity") – national motto of France
