= Sigmund Eisner (academic) =

American scholar of medieval literature (1920–2012)

- Born: December 9, 1920; Red Bank, New Jersey, US
- Died: December 18, 2012 (aged 92)

Academic background
- Education: University of California, Berkeley; Columbia University
- Thesis: A Tale of Wonder (1955)
- Doctoral advisor: Roger Sherman Loomis

Academic work
- Discipline: Literature
- Sub-discipline: Medieval literature
- Institutions: University of Arizona
- Main interests: Geoffrey Chaucer

Sigmund Eisner (1920–2012) was an American scholar of medieval literature. A professor emeritus at the University of Arizona, he was a noted expert on Geoffrey Chaucer and was frequently consulted on matters of astronomy in Chaucer.

== Biography ==
Eisner was born in Red Bank, New Jersey, on December 9, 1920, but was raised in the San Francisco Bay Area. He enrolled at the University of Arizona in 1939, but joined the army after the Second World War. He graduated from the University of California at Berkeley in 1947 and received his Doctor of Philosophy degree from Columbia University in 1955, then was a Fulbright Scholar in Ireland.

Eisner taught at Oregon State University and Dominican College before returning to the University of Arizona, where he taught for over forty years. He died on December 18, 2012.

== Select bibliography ==
- A Tale of Wonder. A Source Study of The Wife of Bath's Tale (Wexford: John English, 1957)
- The Tristan Legend: A Study in Sources (Evanston: Northwestern UP, 1969)
- Geoffrey Chaucer, A Treatise on the Astrolabe. Variorum Edition of the Works of Geoffrey Chaucer 6 (Norman: U of Oklahoma P, 2006; ed. with Marijane Osborn)
