= The Death of Feminism =

2005 book by Phyllis Chesler

The Death of Feminism: What's Next in the Struggle for Women's Freedom
- Author: Phyllis Chesler
- Language: English
- Publisher: Palgrave Macmillan
- Publication date: 2005
- Publication place: United States
- Media type: Print (hardcover)

The Death of Feminism: What's Next in the Struggle for Women's Freedom is a 2005 non-fiction book by Phyllis Chesler. In it, she criticizes the contemporary feminist community for not sufficiently opposing Islamism.

Chesler stated that she chose her title since the movement became characterized by "a moral failure, a moral bankruptcy, a refusal to take on, in particular, Muslim gender apartheid".

A portion of the book describes a period in her life where she was held against her will by her husband's family in Afghanistan. She urges feminists to reconsider any pro-Islamist positions in the book's end chapter.

== Reception ==
Kirkus Reviews stated that it is "a fierce polemic, filled with vigorous arguments and distressing human stories."

Publishers Weekly stated that "Chesler raises important issues, but her style will alienate the very people she means to reach."
