= Riddle scale =

Psychometric scale

The Riddle scale (also known as Riddle homophobia scale or Riddle scale of homophobia) was a psychometric scale that measured the degree to which a person is or is not homophobic. The scale was frequently used in tolerance education about anti-discriminatory attitudes regarding sexual orientation. It is named after its creator, psychologist Dorothy Riddle.

== Overview ==
The Riddle homophobia scale was developed by Dorothy Riddle in 1973–74 while she was overseeing research for the American Psychological Association Task Force on Gays and Lesbians. The scale was distributed at talks and workshops but was not formally published for a long time; it is cited in the literature either as an (unpublished) conference presentation from 1985 or as an article from 1994. At the time it was developed, Riddle's analysis was one of the first modern classifications of attitudes towards homosexuality.

In that respect, the scale has served the purpose that Riddle originally had in mind: she devised the scale to explicate the continuum of attitudes toward gays and lesbians and to assess the current and desired institutional culture of an organization or a work place.

== Level of measurement ==
The Riddle scale is an eight-term uni-dimensional Likert-type interval scale with nominal labels and no explicit zero point. Each term is associated with a set of attributes and beliefs; individuals are assigned a position on the scale based on the attributes they exhibit and beliefs they hold.

The scale is frequently divided into two parts, the 'homophobic levels of attitude' (first four terms) and the 'positive levels of attitude' (last four terms).

== The scale ==
- Repulsion: Homosexuality is seen as a crime against nature. Gays/lesbians are considered sick, crazy, immoral, sinful, wicked, etc. Anything is justified to change them: incarceration, hospitalization, behavior therapy, electroconvulsive therapy, etc.
- Pity: Represents heterosexual chauvinism. Heterosexuality is considered more mature and certainly to be preferred. It is believed that any possibility of becoming straight should be reinforced, and those who seem to be born that way should be pitied as less fortunate ("the poor dears").
- Tolerance: Homosexuality is viewed as a phase of adolescent development that many people go through and most people grow out of. Thus, lesbians/gays are less mature than straights and should be treated with the protectiveness and indulgence one uses with children who are still maturing. It is believed that lesbians/gays should not be given positions of authority because they are still working through their adolescent behavior.
- Acceptance: Still implies that there is something to accept; the existing climate of discrimination is ignored. Characterized by such statements as "You're not lesbian to me, you're a person!" or "What you do in bed is your own business." or "That's fine with me as long as you don't flaunt it!"
- Support: People at this level may be uncomfortable themselves, but they are aware of the homophobic climate and the irrational unfairness, and work to safeguard the rights of lesbians and gays.
- Admiration: It is acknowledged that being lesbian/gay in our society takes strength. People at this level are willing to truly examine their homophobic attitudes, values, and behaviors.
- Appreciation: The diversity of people is considered valuable and lesbians/gays are seen as a valid part of that diversity. People on this level are willing to combat homophobia in themselves and others.
- Nurturance: Assumes that gay/lesbian people are indispensable in our society. People on this level view lesbians/gays with genuine affection and delight, and are willing to be their allies and advocates.

== Discussion ==
Riddle's analysis has been credited for pointing out that although 'tolerance' and 'acceptance' can be seen as positive attitudes, they should actually be treated as negative because they can mask underlying fear or hatred (somebody can tolerate a baby crying on an airplane while at the same time wishing that it would stop) or indicate that there is indeed something that we need to accept, and that we are the ones with the power to reject or to accept. This observation generalizes to attitude evaluations in other areas besides sexual orientation and is one of the strengths of Riddle's study.

Although it deals mostly with adult attitudes towards difference, the model has been positioned in the cognitive developmental tradition of Piaget and Kohlberg's stages of moral development.

As a psychometric scale, the Riddle scale has been considered to have acceptable face validity but its exact psychometric properties are unknown.

== See also ==
- Allport's Scale
- Bisexual erasure
- Heterosexism
- Kinsey Scale
- Kübler-Ross model
- Psychometrics
- Discrimination against asexual people
