= Woodstock School =

School in Mussoorie, Uttarakhand, India

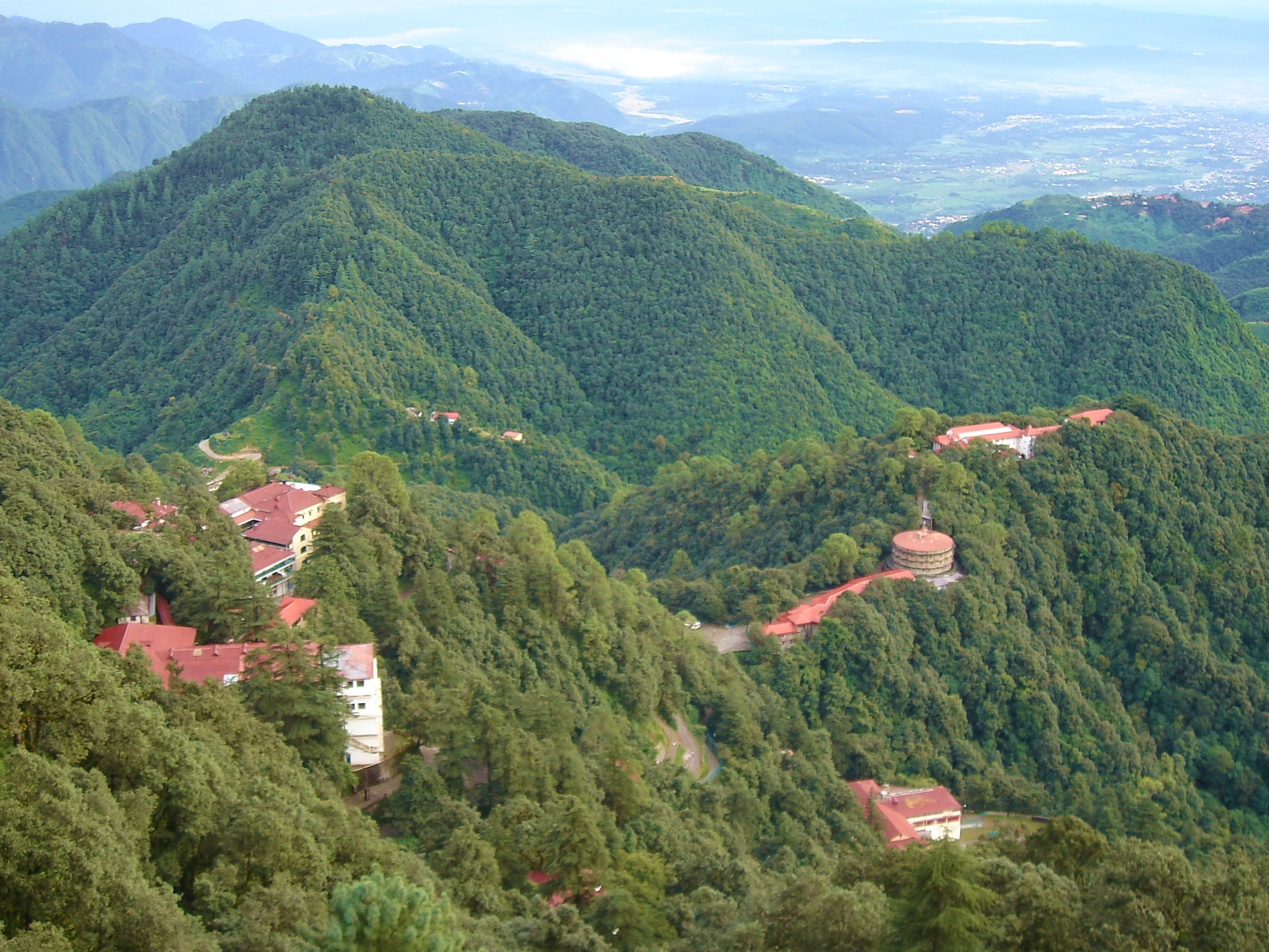
- Woodstock school campus

Location
- Mussoorie, Uttarakhand, 248179; India; 30°27′14″N 78°6′3″E

Information
- Type: Independent, Residential, International
- Motto: Palma non sine pulvere (No reward without effort)
- Religious affiliation: Christian
- Established: 1854; 172 years ago
- Principal: Blair Lee
- Grades: KG–12
- Gender: Coeducational
- Enrolment: 450 students
- Student to teacher ratio: 6:1
- Language: English
- Colours: Brown and gold
- Mascot: Tiger
- Newspaper: The Woodstocker
- Yearbook: Whispering Pine
- Website: www.woodstockschool.in

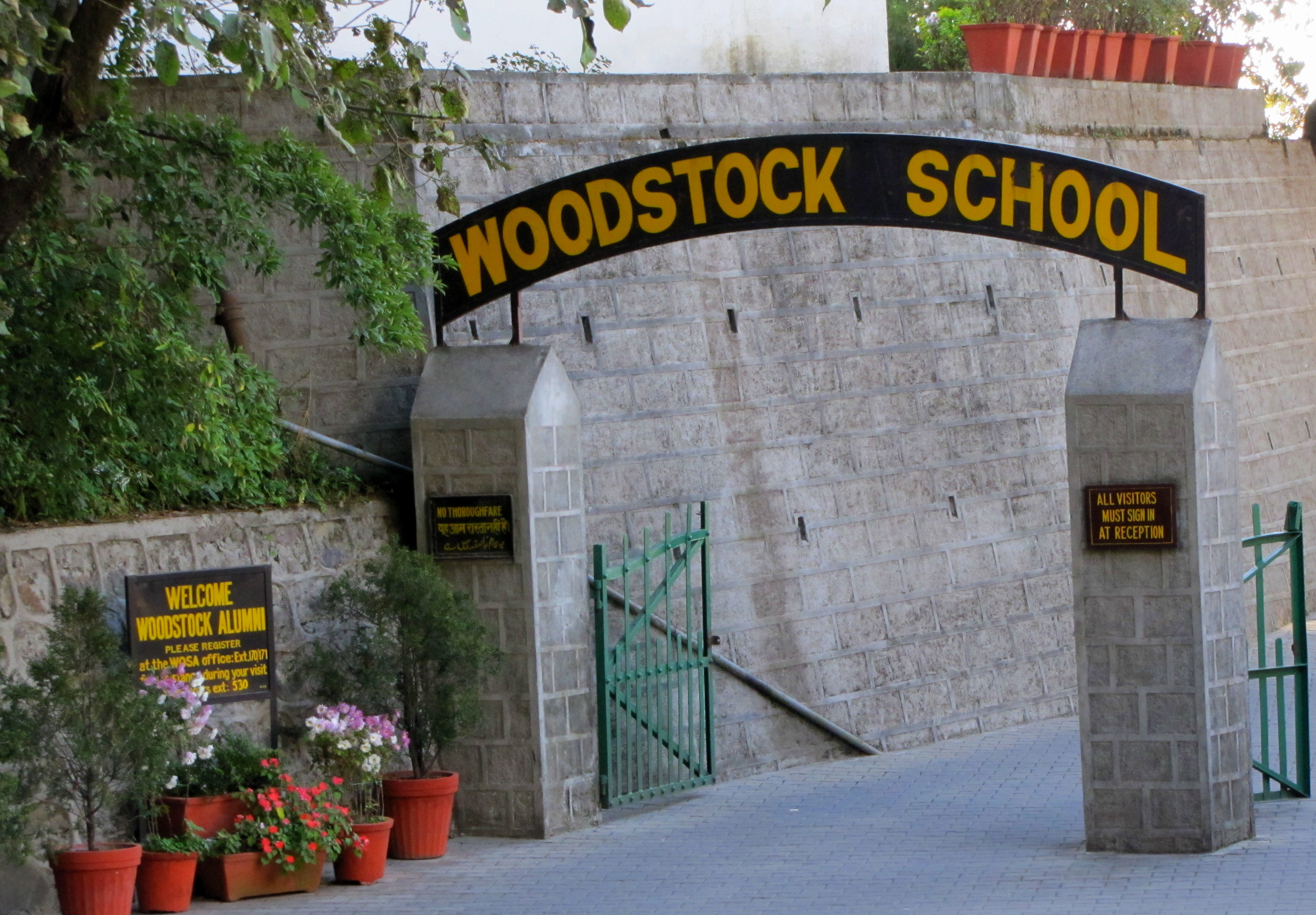
Woodstock entrance

Woodstock School is an international coeducational residential school located in Landour, a small hill station contiguous with the town of Mussoorie, Uttarakhand, India, in the foothills of the Himalayas.

Woodstock is one of the oldest residential schools in Asia, operating today as a private nonprofit institution with Indian Christian Minority Status. Woodstock offers kindergarten through Grade 12 instruction, with a residence programme beginning in Grade 6. It is fully accredited by the Middle States Association, the first school in Asia to receive accreditation in 1960. In 2019 Woodstock School was officially accredited as an International Baccalaureate (IB) World School, with full authorisation for both the IB Middle Years Programme (MYP) and Diploma Programme (DP). It is also regarded as one of the most expensive schools in India.

It is included in The Schools Index of the world's 150 best private schools and among the top 10 international schools in Asia. Architectural Digest named Woodstock one of the nine most beautiful boarding schools in the world.

== History ==
Woodstock was founded in 1854 and has been on its current campus since 1856. Woodstock House, rented from the estate of Colonel Bradshaw Reilly. First managed as a girls’ school with staff provided by an English mission, there came an increasing demand from missionaries for a school in North India with an American curriculum to prepare students for American colleges and universities. By 1928, a full American coeducational programme had been introduced at Woodstock. In 1959, Woodstock was the third high school outside North America and the first school in Asia to receive US accreditation through the Middle States Association of Colleges and Secondary Schools.

During the 1960s, cross-cultural courses in social studies, literature, art, and religion were introduced, and Indian classical music and dance lessons were added. Indian universities became more accepting of the Woodstock Diploma, and in 1990 the Association of Indian Universities recognized the Woodstock Diploma as being equivalent to the Indian school-leaving examination, thus allowing graduates to enter Indian universities with greater ease.

In the 1960s and 1970s Woodstock began to rethink its composition, purpose, and philosophy as an institution. The school consciously shifted its conception from that of a missionary school to a school consisting of an international student body, staff, and curriculum, with a strong Indian cultural component. This was led by Robert Alter, Principal from 1968 to 1978. With the increasing internationalisation of the student body, an English as a Second Language (ESL) programme was established in 1978.

In recent years, Woodstock has renovated classrooms and laboratories, and moved to the International Baccalaureate curriculum. Woodstock became an International Baccalaureate World School in 2019, with authorisation for both the IB Middle Years Programme (MYP) and Diploma Programme (DP). The class of 2021 was the first Woodstock students to graduate with both an American High School Diploma and the International Baccalaureate Diploma.

In 2004, Woodstock celebrated 150 years. The Government of India issued a Woodstock School commemorative postage stamp in 2004.

== Alumni organizations ==
The Woodstock Old Students Association (WOSA) was founded in 1911 and has chapters in many countries.

== Affiliations ==
- International Baccalaureate(IB)
- Council of International Schools (CIS)
- Global Alliance for Innovative Learning (GAIL)
- Association of International Schools in India (TAISI)
- Boarding Schools Association (BSA)
- National Association of Independent Schools (NAIS)
- Academy for International School Heads (AISH)
- Headmasters' and Headmistresses' Conference (HMC)
- Council for Advancement and Support of Education (CASE)
- National Honor Society (NHS)

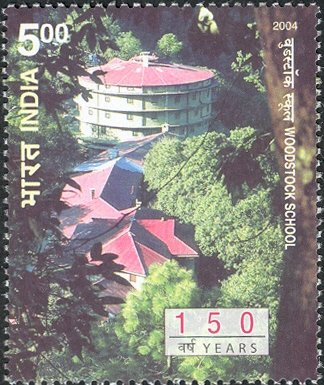
Postal stamp - 150 years of Woodstock School, 2004

== Notable alumni ==
- Chris Anderson, publisher (founder of Future Publishing and owner, CEO and curator of TED) (1974)
- Martha (Marty) Chen (née Alter), academic, scholar and social worker (1960)
- Tom Alter, actor (1968)
- Stephen Alter, author (1974)
- George H. Carley, former Chief Justice of the Supreme Court of Georgia (1956)
- Robert Griffiths, physicist (1952)
- Jonathan Mark Kenoyer, anthropologist (1970)
- Dilshad Najmuddin, Pakistani Inspector-General police officer and ambassador to the Holy See (1945)
- Pernia Qureshi, fashion entrepreneur, designer (2002)
- Dorothy Riddle, psychologist (1960)
- Nayantara Sahgal, writer (1943)
- Henry Scholberg, author (1939)
- Robert E. Scott, law professor (1962)
- Carl E. Taylor, international health expert (1932)
- Jay Smith, American Christian evangelist, apologist and polemicist.
- Kate Forbes, Deputy First Minister of Scotland
- Gita Mehta, writer and filmmaker
- Aditi Saigal, singer and actress
- Saumitra Jha, professor and economist at the Stanford Graduate School of Business
- Ajai Thandi, co-founder Sleepy Owl Coffee
