= Association for Women in Psychology =

The Association for Women in Psychology (AWP)
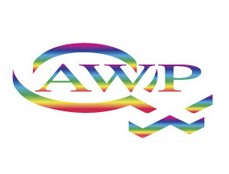
- AWP Logo
- Formation: 1969
- Location(s): Membership Coordinator Counseling Dept, Sonoma State University, Rohnert Park, CA USA 94928-3609
- 2010 Collective Coordinator: Nina Nabors
- Membership Coordinator: Julie L. Shulman
- Website: AWPsych.org

The Association for Women in Psychology (AWP) is a not-for-profit scientific and educational organization committed to encouraging feminist psychological research, theory, and activism.

== History ==
The Association for Women in Psychology (AWP) was founded in 1969 at the annual convention of the American Psychological Association (APA). Its co-founders included Phyllis Chesler, Dorothy Riddle, and E. Kitch Childs. At the time, there was no national organization nor division thereof addressing issues related to the psychology of women. Also in 1969, after an Association for Women in Psychology group had worked on a series of demands, Chesler and Riddle presented the demands at the annual meeting of the APA. Chesler prepared a statement on the APA's obligations to women and demanded one million dollars in reparation for the damage psychology had perpetrated against allegedly mentally ill and traumatized women. Members of the AWP also picketed the APA's Board of Directors meeting, to raise awareness of the sexism within the organization and the field of psychology in general. In response, APA eventually established a division on the Psychology of Women (Division 35) in 1973. Together, AWP and Division 35 successfully advocated for a Women's Program Office at APA's national headquarters.

== Status ==
AWP remains an independent organization, operating separately from Division 35, outside of APA's organizational structure. AWP has held non-governmental organization (NGO) status within the United Nations since 1976. AWP maintains a broad membership inclusive of all people interested in the psychology of women. AWP sponsors regional and national conferences on feminist psychology and offers several awards to recognize significant contributions to the psychology of women. AWP also collaborates with other organizations in support of feminist approaches to psychological theory, research, pedagogy, teaching, and mental health issues. AWP is concerned about such things as reproductive rights and bias in psychiatric diagnosis in DSM-5.

AWP co-sponsors a listserv, POWR-L, the Psychology of Women Resource List, and a suite at the APA convention with Division 35, both of which support collaboration and collegiality among feminists.
