= Carl E. Taylor =

American academic (1916–2010)

Carl E Taylor
- Born: July 26, 1916; Landour, India
- Died: February 4, 2010 (aged 93); Baltimore, Maryland, U.S.
- Parent: Dr. Beth and Dr. John Taylor
- Relatives: Gladys (née Taylor) McGarey, sister
- Scientific career
- Fields: Public Health
- Workplaces: Johns Hopkins School of Public Health & Future Generations

Carl Ernest Taylor, MD, DrPH (July 26, 1916 – February 4, 2010) was a key contributor to the Alma Ata Declaration. At the age of 88, he assumed the position of Country Director for the nonprofit organization Future Generations Afghanistan where he led innovative field-based activities until age 90.

== Early life and education ==
Taylor was born in Landour, a small hill station contiguous with Mussoorie in the Western Himalayas. His parents were medical missionaries in the region. He spent his early years assisting his parents with a mobile clinic in riverine jungles along the Ganges river, where the river leaves the Himalayas and enters the Gangetic Plain. He came back to the US and earned his medical degree from Harvard Medical School. After that, he started practising medicine in Panama where he also met and married his wife. They were together for 58 years until she died in 2001.

In 1947, he returned to India and became the director of Fatehgarh Presbyterian Hospital, near Agra. During the Partition of India, he led a medical team helping the local people. He came back to Harvard and completed his DrPH and his dissertation was about the relation between nutrition and infection and it is regarded as a seminal work in this field. In 1952, he founded the Department of Preventive Medicine in India's Christian Medical College in Ludhiana, Punjab, initiating a series of village health training programs outside that medical campus which, then working with his friend, India's Health Minister Sushila Nayyar, would become a model for India. In 1956 he joined the faculty of the Harvard School of Public Health, returning from there to India in 1962 to initiate what would grow into a three-decade long research regime out of the Narangwal Rural Health Centre. In 1963, he joined the faculty of the Johns Hopkins School of Public Health.

== Death ==
He died of prostate cancer on February 4, 2010. He was 93 and still active and he had his last lecture on January 27, 2010, in his favourite course: Case Studies in Primary Health Care at Johns Hopkins School of Public Health. He had three children.

== Publications ==
Taylor published more than 190 peer-reviewed journal articles, books, chapters and policy monographs.

- Taylor, Daniel C. Taylor, Carl E., Taylor, Jesse O. Empowerment On An Unstable Planet: From Seeds of Human Energy to a Scale of Global Change (New York: Oxford University Press, 2012)
- Taylor-Ide, Daniel C., and Taylor, Carl E., Just and Lasting Change: When Communities Own Their Futures. Johns Hopkins University Press, Baltimore, MD, March 2002
- Taylor, Carl E., Scaling Up Social Development, LEISA Magazine. October 2001.
- Taylor, Carl E., Ethical Issues Influencing Health for All Beyond the Year 2000, Infectious Disease Clinics on North America. Vol. 9: 223-233, 1995.
- Taylor, Carl E., Surveillance for Equity in Primary Health Care: Policy Implications for the International Experience, International Journal of Epidemiology. Vol. 21: 1043-1049, 1992.

== Legacy ==
He continued to teach a course at JHSPH on Primary Health Care with special emphasis on community-based approaches until one week before his death. He has inspired and influenced directly or indirectly many successful community-based health interventions, such as Comprehensive Rural Health Project, Jamkhed and the Home-based newborn care developed by Drs Abhay Bang and Rani Bang among many others.

== Videos and pictures ==
- Reflecting on community health, the 1978 Alma Ata conference on primary health care, and his students' opportunities to change public health. (3 minutes; from a 2008 interview)
- Interview at Global Health TV: At 2008's International Conference on Global Health, he received the award for lifetime achievement. Prof. Taylor took time out to talk with Global Health TV and reflect on his long career.
- Pictures of Carl Taylor at caringbridge.org
- Pictures of Carl Taylor at globalhealth.org

== See also ==
- Alma Ata Declaration
- Global health
- International health
- Jamkhed
- Primary Health Care
