= Women and Madness =

1972 book by Phyllis Chesler

Women and Madness is a 1972 book by Phyllis Chesler.

In the book, Chesler argues that women are negatively impacted by psychiatry and psychology due to the dominance of men in those fields. The work explores the effects on women in same-sex relationships and psychiatry/psychology in the third world. Claudia Pitts of National Louis University wrote that the book was "one of the earliest works of the second wave feminist movement to address issues such as the mistreatment of women, particularly in rape and incest; female role models; and spirituality in mental health services." Miriam Greenspan of the Los Angeles Review of Books described it as "a cultural watershed exposing how male-dominated psychiatry damages women."

== Background ==
Phyllis Chesler is a feminist psychotherapist. As part of the writing process, Chesler conducted interviews.

== Contents ==
In the book Chesler includes an analysis of famous women who had negative endings to their lives and mythological stories from Western tradition involving female characters with negative endings, as well as quotations from psychotherapists and male authors and quotes from female authors, some of whom were feminists. She also included statistics from hospitals.

== Reception ==
Bard College stated that the book "has been reprinted many times in the United States and internationally."

=== Reviews ===
Adrienne Rich, in an article in The New York Times, concluded that Women and Madness "is a pioneer contribution to the feminization of psychiatric thinking and practice." Rich stated that the book at times makes an assumption that the reader is already familiar with the relevant fields.

Roland Jaccard of Le Monde wrote that "like any important book, Women and Madness has the immense merit of 'troubling the world's sleep.'"

Salvatore R. Maddi wrote in The Saturday Review that it is "an extremely important book, a signal that the women's liberation movement is coming of age."
