= Gertrude Schoepperle =

American university teacher (1882-1921)

Gertrude Schoepperle (July 15, 1882 – December 11, 1921) was an American university professor and a scholar of medieval Celtic, French, and German literature.

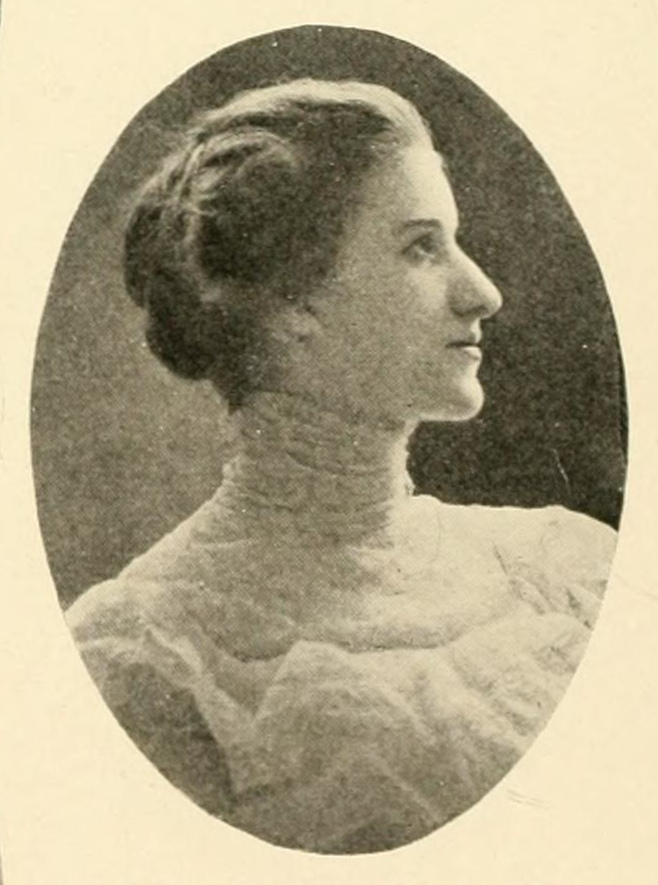
Gertrude Schoepperle in 1903

== Biography ==
Gertrude Schoepperle was born in Oil City, Pennsylvania, July 15, 1882. Her parents were Vinzens Schoepperle, of Rötenbach, Germany, and Elizabeth Klein, of Kittanning, Pennsylvania.

Schoepperle attended Oil City High School. She studied at Wellesley College, Radcliffe College, before traveling abroad to continue her studies in Munich, Paris (with Ferdinand Lot, Joseph Bédier, and Marie Henri d'Arbois de Jubainville), and Dublin. She graduated with a Ph.D. in 1909, at Radcliffe College, with the thesis of "Studies on the Origin of the Tristan Romance".

From 1912 to 1913 she taught German at New York University. From 1911 to 1919, she taught in the English Department at the University of Illinois at Urbana–Champaign and established a strong Celtic studies program. From 1919 to 1921, she taught French at Vassar College.

Schoepperle married Roger Sherman Loomis in August 1919. She died in Poughkeepsie, New York, December 11, 1921, and is buried at Prospect Lawn Cemetery, in Hamburg, New York.

== Selected works ==
- Arthur in Avalon and the Banshee.
- Chievrefoil, 1909
- The love-potion in Tristan and Isolt, 1910
- The Island combat in "Tristan.", 1910
- Sur un yers de la Folie Tristan de Berne, 1911
- Tristan and Isolt, a study of the sources of the romance by Gertrude Schoepperle, 1913
- Folk-ballads of Southern Europe, 1914
- Irish Studies at the University of Illinois, 1918
- The Washer of the Ford, 1919
- John Arnott Macculloch, 1920
- Etude sur le Lancelot en prose, 1921
- John Synge and His Old French Farce, 1921
- The old French "Lai de Nabaret", 1922
