= Evarts G. Loomis =

American homeopathic physician (1910–2003)

- Born: 1910; Newark, New Jersey
- Died: October 2, 2003 (aged 92–93)
- Occupation: Homeopathic physician

Evarts Greene Loomis (1910–2003) was an American homeopathic physician, naturopath, surgeon and author who was regarded as a pioneer of holistic medicine. He was the founder of Meadowlark Holistic Health Retreat.

== Biography ==
Loomis was educated at Haverford College and Cornell Medical School. He was a Quaker. Loomis served as a surgeon during World War II with the United Nations Relief and Rehabilitation Association in Algeria. He was assigned by the Friends' Ambulance Unit in Tenchung, China where he directed a hospital and clinic with an international medical team to treat civilian and military personnel.

After the war, Loomis studied alternative medicine remedies and metaphysical New Thought. His mother Amy Brown Loomis (died February 26, 1980) was a spiritualist medium who claimed to have communicated with Jesus Christ.

Loomis died on October 2, 2003.

== Meadowlark ==
Loomis founded Meadowlark at a property once owned by Louis B. Mayer in Hemet, California. In 1958, it became a holistic medical retreat. Meadowlark hosted conferences and in 1973 a preceptorship program for medical students. He was executive director of Meadowlark and is reported to have treated thousands of guests before retiring in 1991. Loomis advocated juice fasting such as carrot and celery juice for detoxification.

Meadowlark promoted holistic medicine and spiritual healing. The American Holistic Medical Association (AHMA) was formed at their facilities. Gladys McGarey, C. Norman Shealy and William A. McGarey were associated with the AHMA.

== Selected publications ==
- Medicine of the Whole Man (1967)
- Healing for Everyone: Medicine of the Whole Person (1979)
