= Columbia University Mailman School of Public Health =

Graduate school in New York, New York, US

- Type: Private; Graduate school School of Public Health
- Established: 1922; 104 years ago
- Parent institution: Columbia University
- Dean: Jonathan Mermin
- Faculty: 180 Full-Time Faculty
- Students: 1,430
- Location: Manhattan, New York City, United States; 40.84261°N 73.9432°W
- Website: publichealth.columbia.edu

The Columbia University Mailman School of Public Health (formally the Joseph L. Mailman School of Public Health) is the public health graduate school of Columbia University. Located on the Columbia University Irving Medical Center campus in the Washington Heights neighborhood of Manhattan, New York City, United States of America, the school is accredited by the Council on Education for Public Health.

Founded in 1922 as the DeLamar Institute of Public Health, it is one of the oldest public health schools in the United States. It became an official school within Columbia University in 1945. In 1999, following a $33 million gift from the Mailman Foundation, the school was renamed the Joseph L. Mailman School of Public Health in honor of Joseph L. Mailman, an investor, philanthropist and founder of one of the earliest conglomerates in North America.

The school is home to the Calderone Prize, the most prestigious award in the field of public health, as well as numerous research centers, including the Center for Infection and Immunity, ICAP, the Robert N. Butler Columbia Aging Center, and the Center for Environmental Health Sciences in Northern Manhattan.

== History ==
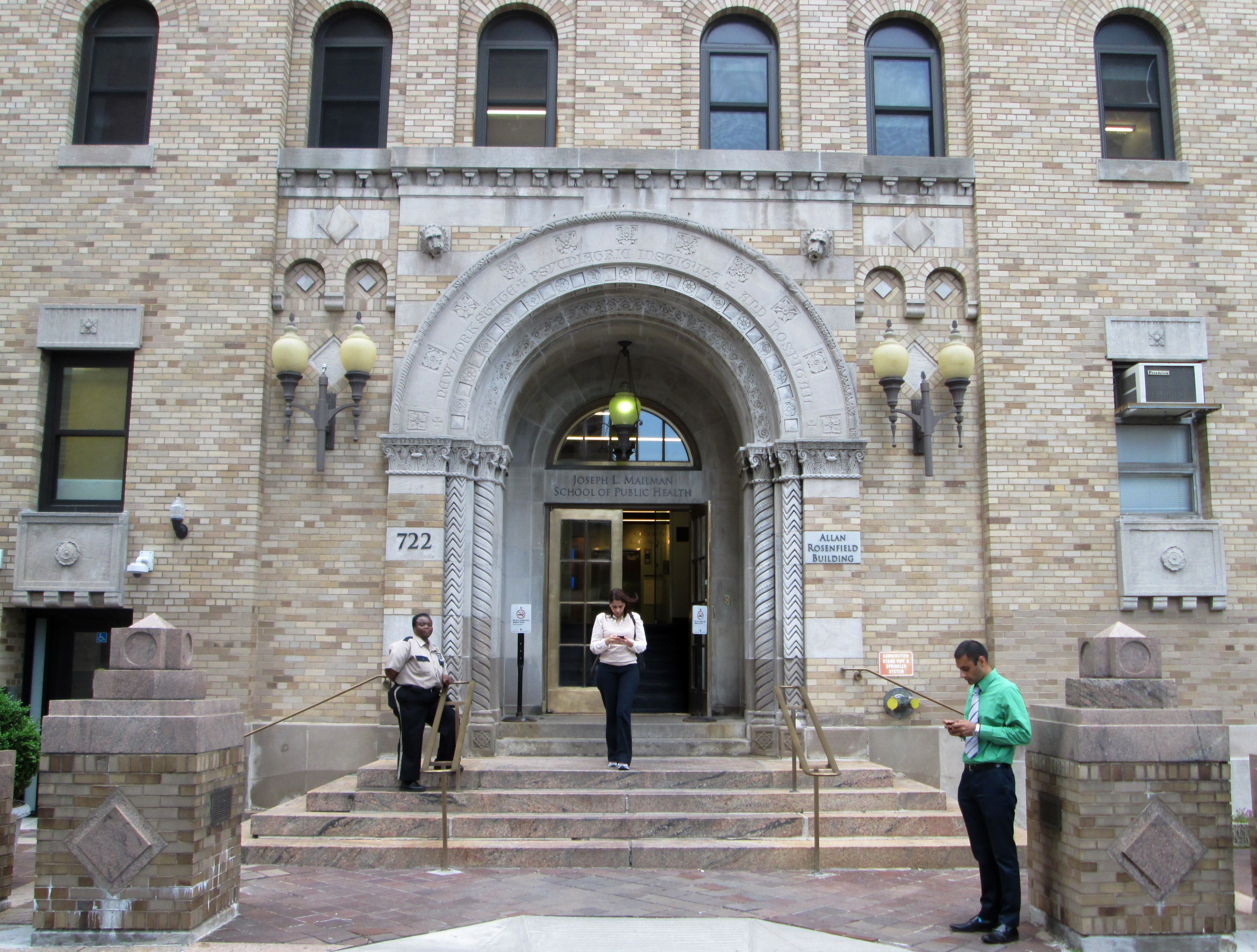
The entrance to the Allan Rosenfield Building at the Mailman School.

In 1918, Columbia University's College of Physicians and Surgeons received a $5 million endowment from the estate of mining magnate Joseph Raphael De Lamar to establish an educational program in public health, which led to what would become the Mailman School of Public Health. The DeLamar Institute of Public Health opened its doors in 1922, and the following year began offering the Master of Science in Public Health degree. In 1940, the Doctor of Science of in Public Health degree was offered for the first time.

In 1945, the designation of "Institute of Public Health" was changed to the "School of Public Health" by the Trustees of Columbia University. In 1967, the nation's first Psychiatric Epidemiology Training Program was established with funding from the National Institute of Mental Health. In 1968, School established the Division of Sociomedical Sciences, the first in the country to offer graduate degrees in social science with a focus on health.

Since 1992, the school has administered the Calderone Prize, regarded as the most prestigious award in the field of public health. The award is made to an individual who has, "accomplished work of extraordinary distinction in the field of public health or made a specific discovery or contribution that has had long-term national or global implications in such areas as communicable disease, environmental health, epidemiology, social and/or behavioral medicine, health policy, or any aspect of health promotion or disease prevention."

In 1998, the Mailman Foundation endowed the school with $33 million, at the time the largest gift ever given to a school of public health. The school was renamed the Joseph L. Mailman School of Public Health in recognition of Joseph Mailman, an investor, philanthropist, and businessman.

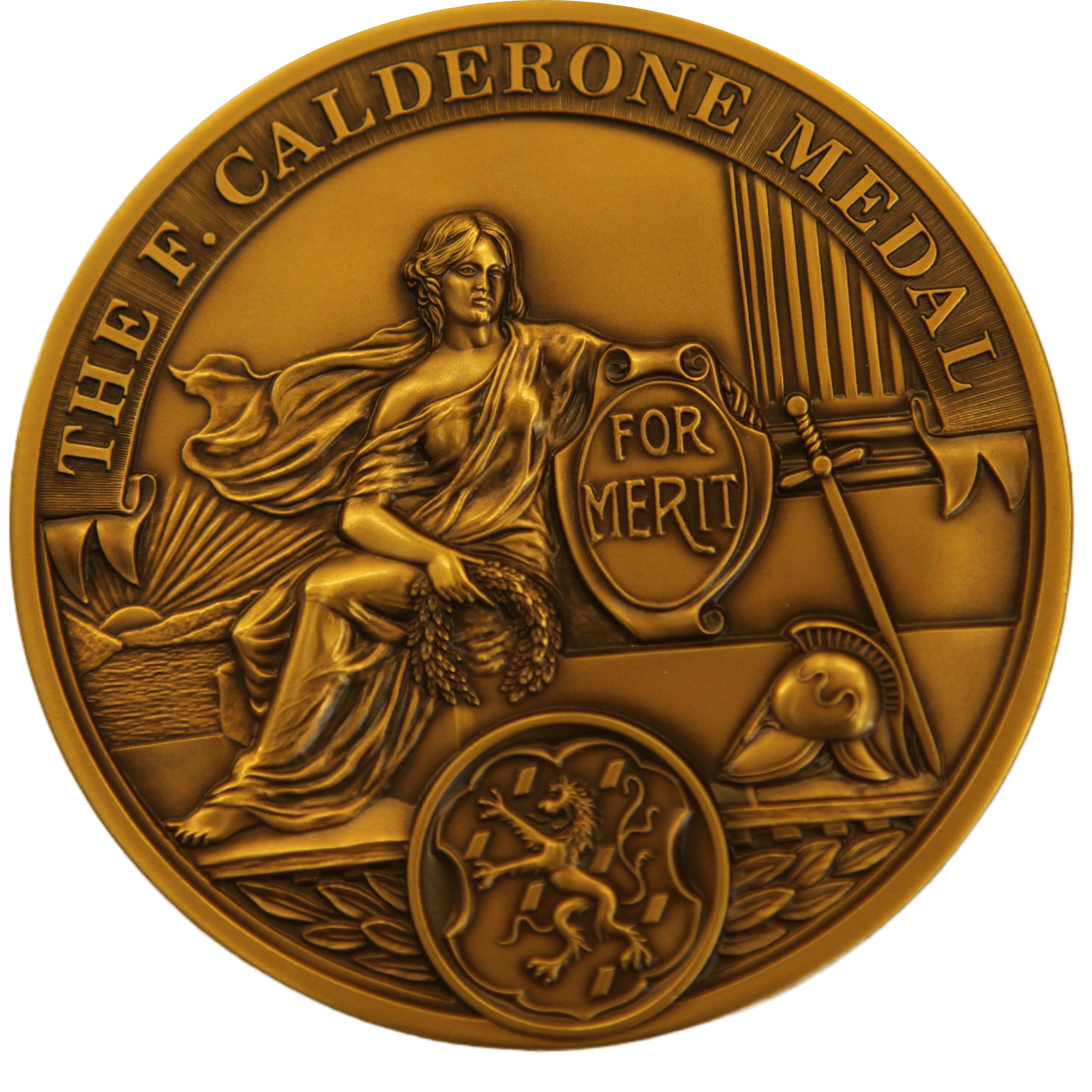
The Calderone Prize is the most prestigious award in the field of public health, and is administered by the Columbia University Mailman School of Public Health.

In 2011, the School established the Climate and Health Program to foster cross-disciplinary, translational scholarship on the human health dimensions of climate change. In 2012, the school redesigned and implemented a new Master of Public Health (MPH) degree to meet global health challenges, which has since become a model at other schools worldwide.

== Educational programs ==
The Mailman School offers MPH, MHA, MS, PhD, and DrPH degrees. The school's educational offerings include 10 dual degree programs with other schools at Columbia University.

== Faculty ==
Jonathan Mermin was named Dean of the school in March 2026.

A total of 180 full-time faculty members work in over 100 countries, as well as in the Northern Manhattan community. Their research areas include climate and health, HIV/AIDS treatment and prevention, healthy aging, maternal health, mental health, environmental toxins and children's environmental health, climate and health, epigenetics, the human microbiome, the history and ethics of public health, healthcare reform, and health systems, among many other critical issues.

Department chairs

- Biostatistics - Kiros Berhane, PhD
- Epidemiology - Charles C. Branas, PhD
- Environmental Health Sciences - Ana Navas-Acien, MD, PhD, MPH
- Health Policy and Management - Michael S. Sparer, PhD, JD
- Population and Family Health - Thoai D. Ngo, PhD, MHS
- Sociomedical Sciences - James Colgrove, PhD, MPH (Interim)

== Student Demographics ==
Demographics as of 2025:

- 1,430 students
- 90% master's students
- 10% doctoral students
- 34 states/territories represented
- 53 countries represented
- 38% non-U.S. citizens

== Employment ==
One year after graduation, 97% of graduates were employed or continuing their studies in graduate school (8% of respondents). The overall median salary 6 months after graduation was $70,000 annually.

== Research Centers ==
=== The Center for Infection and Immunity ===
The Center for Infection and Immunity (CII) is one of the world's largest and most advanced academic centers focused on microbial surveillance, discovery, and diagnosis. CII is directed by W. Ian Lipkin, MD, John Snow Professor of Epidemiology and Professor of Neurology and Pathology who has been named the "World’s Most Celebrated Virus Hunter" due to his speed and innovative methods of identifying new viruses. From the onset of the COVID-19 pandemic, 50 to 60 CII researchers began collaborating with researchers at Sun Yat-sen University in China. Dr. Lipkin had advised the Chinese government and the World Health Organization (WHO) during the 2002–2004 SARS outbreak, for which China awarded him its highest honor in January 2020. CII researchers have discovered more than 1,800 new microbes.

=== ICAP ===
ICAP at Columbia University is a leader in global public health, internationally known for tackling health challenges such as HIV, tuberculosis, malaria, maternal and child health, non-communicable diseases, and most recently, the COVID-19 pandemic—all spanning over more than 40 countries. As a result of ICAP's support, 40.5 million people have been tested for HIV and 2.6 million have received HIV care in ICAP-supported health facilities. At its start, ICAP was led by Wafaa El-Sadr, MD, MPH, MPA, University Professor, and Dr. Mathilde Krim-amfAR Chair of Global Health, and director of Columbia World Projects.

=== Robert N. Butler Columbia Aging Center ===
Columbia University's Robert N. Butler Columbia Aging Center is a university-wide hub for aging science and policy. Located at the Mailman School of Public Health, the center carries out a mission is interdisciplinary research, policy and education to advance aging equity. The Columbia Aging Center houses the International Longevity Center USA (ILC-USA), and it is the current home of the International Association of Gerontology and Geriatrics (IAGG). The ILC-USA is a member of the global consortium of ILCs devoted to the development of policies, awareness campaigns and interventions at the individual and societal level to best respond to populating aging and support longevity. This consortium known as the ILC Global Alliance reaches into 17 countries around the world.

=== The Climate and Health Program ===
The Mailman School houses the Global Consortium on Climate and Health Education, a global network of 200+ Universities committed to educate their students on health impacts of climate change. The school is the first to house a climate and health training program funded by the National Institutes of Health for doctoral students and postdoctoral trainees, and has a Master of Public Health certificate program in Climate and Health.

=== NIEHS Center for Environmental Health in Northern Manhattan ===
The Mailman School is home to the NIH/NIEHS funded Center for Environmental Health in Northern Manhattan, which includes researchers working in environmental health sciences across Columbia University. Virginia Rauh, one of the Center members, was the lead author of a landmark paper showing that chlorpyrifos, a commonly used pesticides, caused neurodevelopmental alterations in children. Her data supported tighter regulations of the pesticides that were initially opposed and blocked by the Trump administration and eventually reinstated under the Biden administration.

=== Epigenetics and Precision Prevention ===
Since 2017, the Mailman School offers a summer Epigenetic Boot Camp for Planning and Analyzing DNA Methylation Studies, a two-day intensive boot camp of seminars and hands-on analytical sessions that provides an overview of concepts, techniques, and data analysis methods utilized in human epigenetics studies.

The Laboratory of Precision Environmental Biosciences, regarded as one of the pioneering epigenetics labs worldwide, is the central focus of a wider Precision Medicine program at the Mailman School, focusing on public health and prevention. That includes research and education on the human microbiome, extracellular RNA communication, molecular epidemiology, genomics, viromics, mitochondriomics, statistical genetics, computational biology, and biomarker sciences.

== Facilities ==
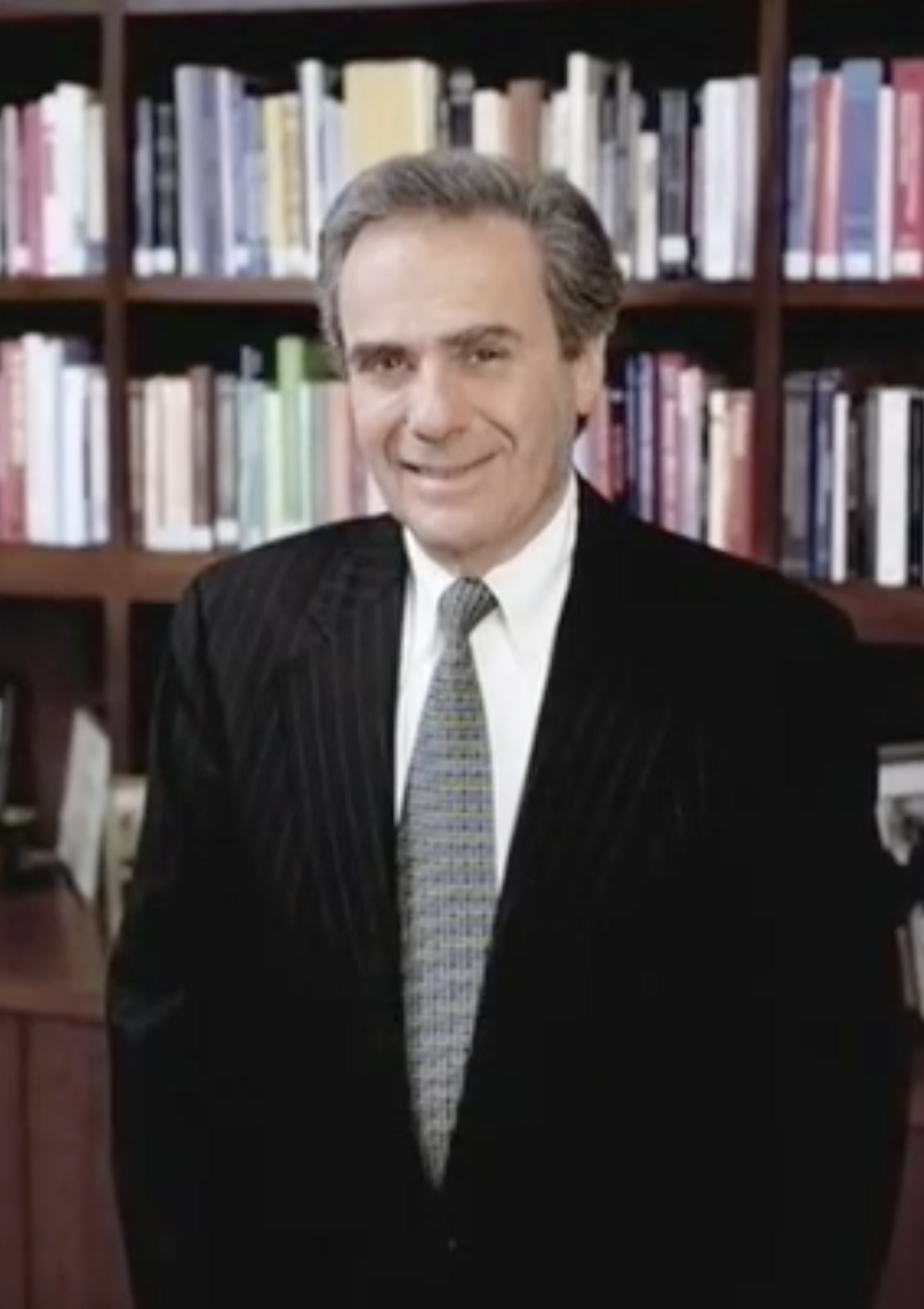
Allan Rosenfield, longtime dean of the Mailman School and women's health advocate during the HIV/AIDS pandemic. The Mailman School's main building was named for Rosenfield.

The Mailman School of Public Health's main facility, the Allan Rosenfield Building, was constructed in 1930 at 1050 Riverside Drive on the Columbia University Irving Medical Center campus. It served as the original New York State Psychiatric Institute until it was moved to a nearby newly constructed facility in 1998.

The building is named after Allan Rosenfield, a longtime dean of the Mailman School who was referred to in The New York Times as a "giant in the world of public health." Renovation work on the building included increased sustainable features.

== Notable alumni ==
- Salim Abdool Karim – South African medical researcher
- Ola Akinboboye – Nigerian-American nuclear cardiologist
- Rebecca Alexander – American Deafblind psychotherapist, author and advocate
- Wendy Atkin – Professor and epidemiologist
- Emma Benn – American biostatistician
- Paolo Boffetta – Italian epidemiologist (born 1958)
- Beverly Buchanan – African-American artist
- Mary Calderone – American physician, author and advocate (1904–1998)
- Chelsea Clinton – American writer (born 1980)
- Millicent A. Comrie – Jamaican doctor
- Angela Diaz – Medical practitioner and academic
- Denise Drace-Brownell – American businessperson and author
- Theodore S. Drachman – American novelist
- Shekinah Elmore – American oncologist (died 2024)
- Pedro Espada Jr. – American politician (born 1953)
- Joseph L. Fleiss – American mathematician (1937–2003)
- Chandra Ford – American public health academic
- Laura Forese – American pediatric orthopedic surgeon and hospital administrator
- Tom Frieden – American physician
- Sandro Galea – American epidemiologist
- Madelyn Gould – American epidemiologist and researcher
- Alphonse A. Haettenschwiller – American military officer and politician (1925–2025)
- James G. Haughton – American physician
- Cheryl Healton – American public health researcher
- Judith Jacobson – Epidemiologist
- Jon Jaques – American basketball player (born 1988)
- Barry Jordan – American neurologist
- Kathie-Ann Joseph
- Katherine Keyes – American epidemiologist
- Ann Kurth
- Margaret Morgan Lawrence – American psychiatrist
- Jessica Y. Lee – American dentist
- Brian Lehrer – American radio broadcaster (born 1952)
- Donna Lynne – American politician (born 1953)
- Dolores Malaspina – American psychiatrist
- Neha Mankani – Pakistani midwife
- Aletha Maybank – American physician
- Mary Ann McLaughlin – American cardiologist
- Ilan Meyer – American psychiatric epidemologist (born 1956)
- Karin B. Michels – Epidemiologist
- Robert Lewis Morgan – American politician
- Anthony Munroe – American businessman
- Eleanor Murray – British-Canadian Epidemiologist, science communicator
- Mary Northridge – American epidemiologist
- John Nwangwu – Nigerian-born epidemiologist (born 1952)
- James Oleske – American pediatrician; one of the first to identify HIV in children
- Nigel Paneth – English pediatrician and epidemiologist
- Tania Patriota – Colombian diplomat
- Ralph L. Sacco – American neurologist (1957–2023)
- Wafaa El-Sadr – Egyptian physician
- Arthur Schatzkin – American epidemiologist (1948–2011)
- Nina Schwalbe – American public health researcher
- Susan Shaw (conservationist) – American scientist, explorer, conservationist, author (1943–2022)
- Yvonne Thornton – American obstetrician and musician (born 1947)
- Ernest S. Tierkel – Epidemiologist (1917–1981)
- Christy Turlington – American model (born 1969)
- Sten H. Vermund
- Warren Winkelstein – American epidemiologist
