= James Haughton =

James Haughton may refer to:

- James Haughton (police officer) (1914–2000), British police officer
- James Haughton (reformer) (1795–1873), Irish social reformer, temperance activist and vegetarian
- James Haughton (activist) (1929–2016), American civil rights activist, labor leader, community organizer, and social worker
- James G. Haughton, American public health administrator
