= Wafaa El-Sadr =

Egyptian physician

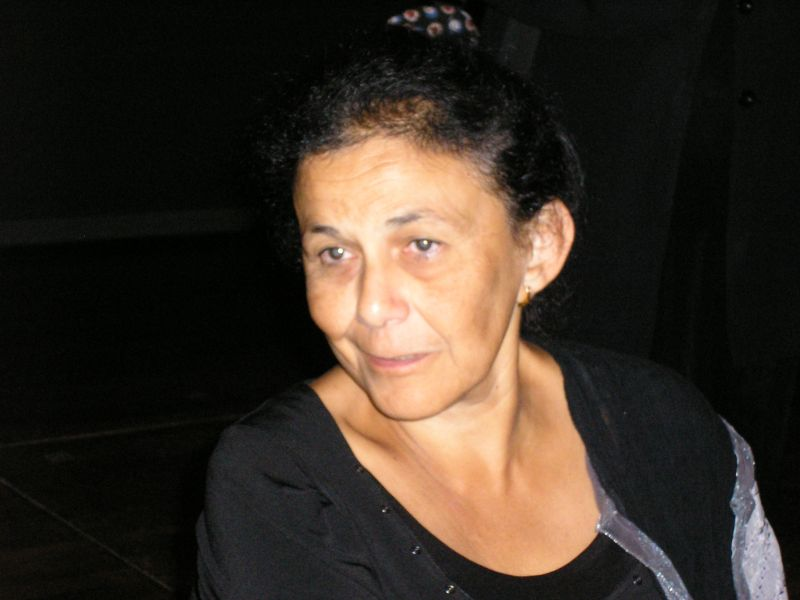
- Wafaa El-Sadr at the Consortium of Universities for Global Health 2010 Seattle conference
- Born: August 1950 (age 76); Egypt
- Education: Cairo University (MD), Columbia Mailman School of Public Health (MSc Epidemiology), John F. Kennedy School of Government - Harvard University (MSc Public Administration)
- Occupations: Physician, Epidemiologist
- Employer: Columbia University
- Known for: Public health; MacArthur Fellow

Wafaa El-Sadr is an Egyptian-American Columbia University Professor and the director of ICAP at Columbia University, Columbia World Projects, and the Center for Infectious Disease Epidemiologic Research (CIDER) at Columbia Mailman School of Public Health.

== Education ==
El-Sadr holds a medical degree from Cairo University, Egypt, a master's of public health degree in epidemiology from the Columbia Mailman School of Public Health, and a master's in public administration degree from the John F. Kennedy School of Government at Harvard University. She is Board certified in internal medicine and infectious diseases.

- MD, 1974, Cairo University
- MPH, 1991, Columbia University
- MPA, 1996, Harvard University Kennedy School

== Career and accomplishments ==
From 1988 to 2008, El-Sadr led the Division of Infectious Diseases at Harlem Hospital Center, where she helped develop HIV/AIDS and tuberculosis (TB) program. She has led a number of research studies and grant-funded programs through funding from the National Institutes of Health, U.S. Centers for Disease Control and Prevention, U.S. Agency for International Development, Health Resources and Services Administration, New York State and New York City Departments of Health as well as private foundations.

Working with former dean of the Columbia University Mailman School of Public Health Allan Rosenfield, El-Sadr helped establish the MTCT-Plus initiative, a global program that aims to provide women and their families with HIV-related services. ICAP covers 13 countries in sub-Saharan Africa. ICAP entered into a settlement with the US Department of Justice for fraud and submission of false claims in 2014, and paid $9 million in restitution to the US government.

In 2011, she has focused her efforts on highlighting the continued impact of HIV in the United States, establishing the Domestic Prevention Working Group within the NIH-funded HIV Prevention Trials Network.

In 2008, El-Sadr was named a John D. and Catherine T. MacArthur Foundation Fellow. In 2009, Rolling Stone magazine named El-Sadr in its list of "100 People Who Are Changing America." In the same year, she was also named as one of Scientific American 10: Guiding Science for Humanity. She is also a member of the Institute of Medicine of the National Academies. In November 2009, The Utne Reader named El-Sadr one of the "50 Visionaries Who Are Changing Your World."

El-Sadr is a member of the science planning committees for the International AIDS Society conference in Vienna (2010) and the Conference on Retroviruses and Opportunistic Infections (CROI, 2010). She is a member of the Technical Advisory Group on Tuberculosis for the World Health Organization and a board member for the Population Council. She has served as a member of the Antiviral Advisory Committee for the U.S. Food and Drug Administration, and the Advisory Council for the Elimination of TB at the U.S. Centers for Disease Control and Prevention. She also has served on the amfAR board. She is a fellow of the Infectious Diseases Society of America and previously chaired its tuberculosis committee. In 2021, she became the director of Columbia World Projects at Columbia University.

== Works and recognition ==
- Founder and global director of ICAP
- Member of Board of Directors at IAFA since 2022
- Awarded an honorary Doctor of Science at Boston University

== Selected publications ==
- Wafaa M El-Sadr, Jessica Justman. 2020. Africa in the Path of Covid-19. N Engl J Med; 383(3):e11. doi:10.1056/nejmp2008193.
- Wafaa M El-Sadr, Katherine Harripersaud, Miriam Rabkin. 2017. Reaching global HIV/AIDS goals: What got us here, won't get us there. PLoS Med; 14(11):e1002421. doi:10.1371/journal.pmed.1002421.
- Roger I Glass, Wafaa El-Sadr, Eric Goosby, Linda E Kupfer. 2019. The HIV response and global health. Lancet; 393(10182):1696. doi:10.1016/s0140-6736(19)30353-8.
- Wafaa M El-Sadr. 2020. What one pandemic can teach us in facing another. AIDS; 34(12):1757-1759. doi:10.1097/qad.0000000000002636.
