= Maybank (surname) =

Maybank is a surname. Notable people with the surname include:

- Aletha Maybank (born 1974), American physician
- Anthuan Maybank (born 1969), American sprinter
- Burnet R. Maybank (1899–1954), American politician
- Hannah Maybank (born 1974), British artist
- Ralph Maybank (1890–1965), Canadian politician
- Teddy Maybank (born 1956), British footballer

== See also ==
- Clifton Maybank, a hamlet in Dorset, England
