= Forese =

Forese is an Italian surname. Notable people with the surname include:

- Laura Forese, American pediatric orthopedic surgeon and hospital administrator
- Thomas Forese, American politician

== See also ==
- Forese Donati (died 1296), Italian nobleman
