= Patriota (surname) =

Patriota is a surname. Notable people with the surname include:

- Anchieta Patriota (born 1957), Brazilian politician
- Antonio Patriota (born 1954), Brazilian diplomat
- Diego Silva Patriota (born 1986), Brazilian footballer
- Tania Patriota, Brazilian diplomat
