= Ana Navas-Acien =

Spanish physician-epidemiologist

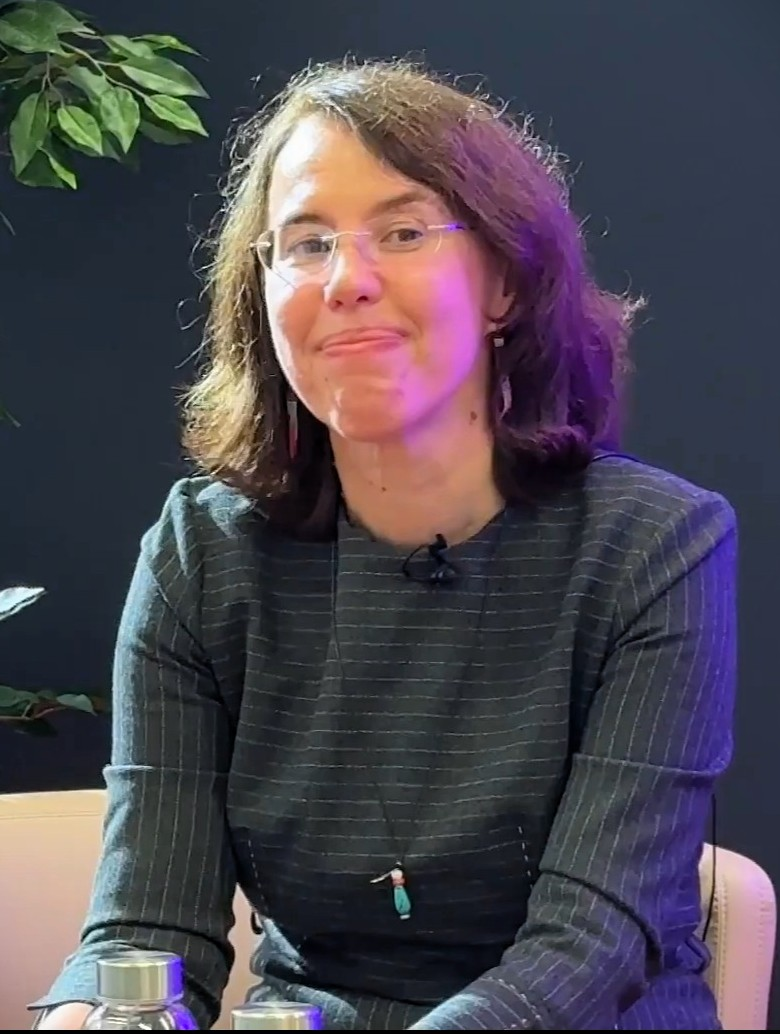
- Navas Acién in 2024
- Born: Almería
- Education: University of Granada; Johns Hopkins University
- Scientific career
- Workplaces: Hospital Universitario La Paz; Columbia Mailman School of Public Health; Johns Hopkins University
- Thesis: A prospective study of low arsenic exposure, type 2 diabetes and fatal myocardial infarction in Washington County, Maryland (2005)

Ana Navas-Acien is a Spanish physician-epidemiologist who is the Leon Hess Professor and Chair of Environmental Health Sciences at Columbia Mailman School of Public Health. She works to improve the quality of drinking water for American Indian communities.

== Early life and education ==
Navas-Acien grew up in Almería, a desert-like part of Spain with scarce access to drinking water. Her parents relied on aljibe, a rainwater collection system. She earned her undergraduate degree in medicine at the University of Granada. She moved to the Hospital Universitario La Paz for her specialty training, and eventually to Johns Hopkins University for a doctoral degree. In Madrid, she became interested in environmental risk and how to support communities. Her doctorate focused on arsenic exposure and how it impacts public health, specifically type 2 diabetes and myocardial infarction. As a doctoral researcher she was a member of Phi Beta Kappa.

== Research and career ==
Navas-Acien works on environmental exposures, molecular pathways and effective interventions for improving public health. She has studied risk factors for cardiovascular and kidney disease in minority communities. She has explained that exposures to metals is commonplace in everyday society, and whilst some are essential for physiological functioning, some are risk factors for cardiovascular disease. Navas-Acien has explored concentrations of arsenic in American drinking water, and showed the contaminant was present in significant amounts in Hispanic communities and in the Southwest. She has shown that arsenic contamination is linked to the development of type 1 diabetes.

In 2016, Navas-Acien joined the Columbia University Mailman School of Public Health. She was appointed by Joe Biden to serve on the National Cancer Institute Advisory Board in 2023. That year she was named the Senior Mentor of the Year by the Irving Institute for Clinical and Translational Research. She was named the Leon Hess Professor in 2024. In April 2025, she joined a group of environmental health scientists to launch an educational video series about why environmental health is important for everyone's lives.

== Selected publications ==
- Public Health Consequences of E-Cigarettes, National Academies Press, 18 May 2018, doi:10.17226/24952, Wikidata Q60530630
- Felicia Hill-Briggs; Nancy E Adler; Seth A. Berkowitz; Marshall H Chin; Tiffany L Gary-Webb; Ana Navas-Acien; Pamela L Thornton; Debra Haire-Joshu (2020). "Social Determinants of Health and Diabetes: A Scientific Review". Diabetes Care. doi:10.2337/dci20-0053. PMC 7783927. PMID 33139407. Wikidata Q101164386.
- Ana Navas-Acien; Eliseo Guallar; Ellen K Silbergeld; Stephen J Rothenberg (2007). "Lead exposure and cardiovascular disease--a systematic review". Environmental Health Perspectives. 115 (3): 472–82. doi:10.1289/ehp.9785. PMC 1849948. PMID 17431501. Wikidata Q22306125.
- Ana Navas-Acien; Ellen K Silbergeld; Roberto Pastor-Barriuso; Eliseo Guallar (2008). "Arsenic exposure and prevalence of type 2 diabetes in US adults". JAMA. 300 (7): 814–822. doi:10.1001/jama.300.7.814. PMID 18714061. Wikidata Q34810681.
