= Jessica Lee (disambiguation) =

Jessica Lee is a British politician.

Jessica Lee may also refer to:

- Jessica Lee (actress), British musical theatre actress
- Jessica Lee (cyclist) (born 1990), Hong Kong cyclist
- Jessica Lee (figure skater) (born 1999), American figure skater
- Jessica Lee (model), American model
- Jessica J. Lee, Canadian author and environmental historian
- Jessica Y. Lee, American dentist

== See also ==
- Jessica Lee Rose (born 1987), American-New Zealand actress
- Jessica Lee Goldyn (born 1985), American actress
- Jesse Lee (disambiguation)
- Jessie Lee (disambiguation)
- Jess Lee (disambiguation)
