= Charles Branas =

Gun violence researcher

Charles C. Branas
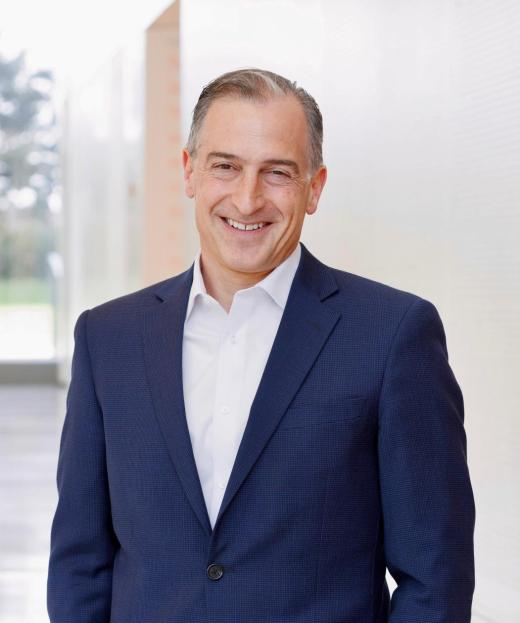
- Education: Franklin & Marshall College, Drexel University, Johns Hopkins Bloomberg School of Public Health
- Known for: Urban planning, Gun violence research
- Awards: Member of the National Academy of Medicine, Member of the American Epidemiological Society
- Scientific career
- Fields: Epidemiology, public health
- Workplaces: Columbia Mailman School of Public Health, University of Pennsylvania, University of California, Berkeley
- Thesis: A trauma resource allocation model for ambulances and hospitals (1997)
- Website: https://www.publichealth.columbia.edu/profile/charles-branas-phd

Charles C. Branas is an American epidemiologist and public health expert whose research integrates epidemiology, urban planning, emergency medicine, and social policy. He is the Gelman Professor of Epidemiology and Chair of the department of epidemiology at Columbia University's Mailman School of Public Health.

Branas is recognized for his studies on gun violence prevention, geographic access to healthcare, and place-based interventions to improve population health. He is a member of the National Academy of Medicine and a widely cited producer of public health-driven, upstream prevention strategies.

== Education and career ==
Branas received a Bachelor of Arts degree from Franklin & Marshall College in 1990 and a Master of Science in 1993 from Drexel University. Branas earned a PhD in epidemiology from Johns Hopkins University in 1998, where he studied under Ellen MacKenzie at the Bloomberg School of Public Health and Charles ReVelle at the Whiting School of Engineering. He then pursued postdoctoral training at the University of California, Berkeley, which he completed in 2000.

Early in his career, Branas worked in emergency medical services as a paramedic. He subsequently held research and teaching positions in clinical and public health settings, focusing on injury prevention and trauma care systems, including leading optimization studies for helicopter depot and trauma center locations that demonstrated a 34% gain in 60-minute access to care across twelve U.S. states. Prior to joining Columbia University, he was a faculty member at the University of Pennsylvania's Perelman School of Medicine, where his work centered on the geography of medical care access and firearm-related injury.

In 2017, Branas was appointed Chair of the Department of Epidemiology at Columbia University's Mailman School of Public Health, one of the oldest epidemiology departments in the world. In collaboration with Hostos Community College and the Columbia School of General Studies, Branas also led the creation of the NextGen Public Health Scholars Program, a 2+2+2 associate to bachelors to masters degree pipeline program for public health scholars. He has led multiple large-scale research initiatives, including two Centers for Disease Control and Prevention (CDC)-funded injury research centers.

== Research ==
Branas is known for studying how place-based and structural factors (the built environment, housing, and emergency response systems) influence health, safety, and access to care. His work integrates methods from epidemiology, public health, and urban planning to study issues such as gun violence, emergency medical systems, and neighborhood-level interventions. He has applied these approaches in U.S. and international settings, focusing on how the physical and social environment contributes to injury, disease, and health disparities, and has authored or co-authored hundreds of scientific publications.

=== Urban health and place-based interventions ===
Branas established a scientific evidence base for using simple, low-cost interventions such as greening vacant lots and remediating abandoned buildings to improve health and safety in urban settings. In 2018, he led the first series of citywide randomized controlled trials showed that such interventions can lead to reductions in gun violence by up to 30%, and decreases in self-reported fear and depression among residents. His work has shown that approximately 15% of the spaces in US cities is vacant or abandoned, a total area about the size of Switzerland, making low-cost citywide interventions like these of high value to urban planners and policymakers. These findings were called "one of the most exciting research experiments in social science," highlighted in over 150 news outlets, and have influenced city planning and public safety strategies internationally.

Since the 2018 paper, Branas and colleagues have expanded their work to explore how place-based interventions can support broader urban health goals and community resilience. Their studies in several U.S. cities, including Philadelphia, Youngstown, OH, Flint, MI, Detroit, Newark, and New Orleans have demonstrated sustained reductions in crime and violence, as well as broader improvements in social cohesion and perceptions of safety among the thousands of remediated lots and buildings that he and his collaborators fixed as part of their experimental research, something that he has called "win-win science that generates new knowledge while simultaneously creating positive, real-world changes and providing health-enhancing resources for local communities." Other cities, such as Dallas, TX, subsequently made use of this work to launch their own placed-based violence prevention efforts. Branas's recent studies have also explored gender differences in the impacts of place-based interventions, as well as their effects on COVID-19 outcomes.

Branas is also a co-author of "Changing Places: The Science and Art of New Urban Planning" (2019), a book examining how urban design and place-based strategies can influence health, safety, and social outcomes.

=== Gun violence and injury prevention ===
Branas has written extensively about the epidemiology and prevention of firearm injury. In 1995, he and his colleagues conducted the first study showing that patients who had been injured, often with firearms, had similar outcomes whether they were transported to hospitals by police or paramedics. Their findings helped inform city policy and several later studies suggesting that police transport improves survival of violently injured people and community perceptions of police. Branas has also conducted several studies examining the risk factors for gun violence, including firearm possession, alcohol use, and environmental context. His 2004 study showed that rural US residents were at greater risk of gun suicide than urban residents were of gun homicide. This study overturned long-held ideas about gun violence as primarily a "city problem" and was covered by Pulitzer-prize winning reporter Fox Butterfield. Follow-up work from 2023 also showed that rural Americans experience higher rates of gun death than residents of urban centers.

In 2009, he published the first study to show that individuals in possession of firearms were more than four times as likely to be shot than those not in possession. A 50-year-long study, published in 2025, corroborated these findings and expanded on them to highlight the potential context-dependent value of firearms for self-defense.

Branas' research has informed national discussions on firearm safety and has been cited in legal and policy debates, including the Surgeon General's Advisory. Findings and fieldwork from his NIH study, a first focused on gun violence, were later re-enacted in a 2016 episode of Through the Wormhole with Morgan Freeman.

=== COVID-19 response and systems modeling ===
During the COVID-19 pandemic, Branas applied public health and systems science approaches to analyze healthcare capacity and risk at the population level. His work included forecasting hospital surge capacity, hospital critical care resource needs, evaluating geographic disparities in care access, and assessing the impact of demographic shifts during the pandemic. He also examined the pandemic's effects on structural health challenges, including those related to incarceration, housing, and disparities in access to care.

=== Community engagement and global health ===
Branas has studied and led programs on health systems and place-based interventions in various settings beyond the United States, including Guatemala, New Zealand, Guyana, and Greece. His global health work has focused on injury prevention, refugee health, and capacity building in low- and middle-income countries. In Greece, his work on the relationship between economic conditions and suicide was used to question the continuation of austerity measures. In the United States, his community health research often involves partnerships with local organizations to co-develop and evaluate public health interventions targeting historically underserved neighborhoods.

=== Other work ===
Branas has been involved in applying public health research to real-world settings, including in support of the field of epidemiology, local and global initiatives, and evidence-based gun violence prevention.

From 2020 to 2023, he served as Chair of the National Academies of Sciences, Engineering, and Medicine's Committee on Applied Research for Hazard Mitigation and Resilience. He is Co-Chair of the Firearm Violence Special Interest Group at the National Academy of Medicine and a founding board member of the Research Society for the Prevention of Firearm-Related Harms.

Branas is a co-founder of the Columbia Scientific Union for the Reduction of Gun Violence (SURGE), an interdisciplinary initiative that brings together researchers from across Columbia University to advance evidence-based strategies for gun violence prevention; they envision that "more science means less violence." The initiative fosters collaboration among scholars in public health, education, medicine, law, and social work to generate new data and inform policy decisions.

He has been active in organizing and chairing scientific meetings, including leadership roles with the American Public Health Association and co-organizing the National Research Conference on Firearm Injury Prevention.

== Awards and honors ==
- Elected Member, American Epidemiological Society, 2014
- Elected Member, National Academy of Medicine, 2019
- Outstanding Experimental Field Trial Award, American Society of Criminology, 2020
- Alumni Citation, Franklin & Marshall College, 2020

== Selected publications ==
- Branas, Charles C.; MacKenzie, Ellen J.; Williams, Justin C.; Schwab, C. William; Teter, Harry M.; Flanigan, Marie C.; Blatt, Alan J.; ReVelle, Charles S. (2005-06-01). "Access to Trauma Centers in the United States". JAMA. 293 (21): 2626–2633. doi:10.1001/jama.293.21.2626. ISSN 0098-7484. PMID 15928284.
- Branas, Charles C.; Richmond, Therese S.; Culhane, Dennis P.; Ten Have, Thomas R.; Wiebe, Douglas J. (2009). "Investigating the Link Between Gun Possession and Gun Assault". American Journal of Public Health. 99 (11): 2034–2040. doi:10.2105/ajph.2008.143099. ISSN 0090-0036. PMC 2759797. PMID 19762675.
- Branas, Charles C.; Kastanaki, Anastasia E.; Michalodimitrakis, Manolis; Tzougas, John; Kranioti, Elena F.; Theodorakis, Pavlos N.; Carr, Brendan G.; Wiebe, Douglas J. (2015-01-01). "The impact of economic austerity and prosperity events on suicide in Greece: a 30-year interrupted time-series analysis". BMJ Open. 5 (1) e005619. doi:10.1136/bmjopen-2014-005619. ISSN 2044-6055. PMC 4316557. PMID 25643700.
- Branas, Charles C.; South, Eugenia; Kondo, Michelle C.; Hohl, Bernadette C.; Bourgois, Philippe; Wiebe, Douglas J.; MacDonald, John M. (2018-02-26). "Citywide cluster randomized trial to restore blighted vacant land and its effects on violence, crime, and fear". Proceedings of the National Academy of Sciences. 115 (12): 2946–2951. Bibcode:2018PNAS..115.2946B. doi:10.1073/pnas.1718503115. ISSN 0027-8424. PMC 5866574. PMID 29483246.
- Reeping, Paul M.; Cerdá, Magdalena; Kalesan, Bindu; Wiebe, Douglas J.; Galea, Sandro; Branas, Charles C. (2019-03-06). "State gun laws, gun ownership, and mass shootings in the US: cross sectional time series". BMJ. 364: l542. doi:10.1136/bmj.l542. ISSN 0959-8138. PMC 6402045. PMID 30842105.
- Zebrowski, Alexis; Rundle, Andrew; Pei, Sen; Yaman, Tonguc; Yang, Wan; Carr, Brendan G.; Sims, Sarah; Doorley, Ronan; Schluger, Neil; Quinn, James W.; Shaman, Jeffrey; Branas, Charles C. (2021-04-15). "A Spatiotemporal Tool to Project Hospital Critical Care Capacity and Mortality From COVID-19 in US Counties". American Journal of Public Health. 111 (6): 1113–1122. doi:10.2105/AJPH.2021.306220. ISSN 1541-0048. PMC 8101594. PMID 33856876.
- South, Eugenia C.; MacDonald, John M.; Tam, Vicky W.; Ridgeway, Greg; Branas, Charles C. (2023-01-01). "Effect of Abandoned Housing Interventions on Gun Violence, Perceptions of Safety, and Substance Use in Black Neighborhoods: A Citywide Cluster Randomized Trial". JAMA Internal Medicine. 183 (1): 31–39. doi:10.1001/jamainternmed.2022.5460. ISSN 2168-6106. PMC 9857286. PMID 36469329.

== Selected press ==
- The New York Times, 2005
- New Scientist, 2009
- The Atlantic, 2011
- The Philadelphia Inquirer, 2017
- The New Yorker, 2018
- Scientific American, 2018
- Science, 2018
- CNN, 2019
- The Chicago Reporter, 2019
- The Wall Street Journal, 2020
- The Washington Post, 2020
- FOX28, 2025

== Personal life ==
Branas is married to Andrea R. Branas, an associate professor in the Department of Health and Rehabilitation Sciences at Temple University's College of Public Health.
