= Kathie-Ann Joseph =

- Born: 1970 (age 55–56); Spanish Town
- Education: Harvard University, Columbia University, Columbia University Mailman School of Public Health
- Scientific career
- Workplaces: New York University, Bellevue Medical Center, Columbia University Medical Center

Kathie-Ann Joseph is a surgeon and researcher at New York University Langone Health where she specializes in breast surgery and oncology surgery. Joseph is also the chief of breast surgery at Bellevue Medical Center, where she was recognized in 2015 as Bellevue's Physician of the Year. Joseph works to reduce disparities in cancer care in order to improve health care for individuals in need. Specifically, Joseph focuses on developing programs that will help African-American women to address their needs in breast cancer prevention and care. She is also studying the effects of a cell surface receptor molecule called RAGE which appears to play a role in tumor growth.

Kathie-Ann Joseph is the first African-American woman to be appointed to the faculty at New York-Presbyterian Hospital/Columbia University Medical Center in the Department of Surgery. She has presented before the President's Cancer Panel, an advisory board to the President of the United States. and has advised the New York State Cancer Consortium on the development of its cancer control plan. In 2009, Essence magazine included her among the year's 25 Most Influential African Americans.

== Background ==
Kathie-Ann Ramsay was born to Royes Ramsay and Thelma Ramsay in Spanish Town, Jamaica in 1970. She grew up in Brooklyn, New York and graduated from Stuyvesant High School in 1987. Kathie-Ann Ramsay married David Joseph in 1995 at Coral House in Baldwin, New York. She continues to live in Brooklyn, New York with her husband, Dr. David Joseph and her two sons, Devon Joseph and Justin Joseph.

== Education and experience ==
Joseph earned her bachelor's degree in sociology in 1991 from Harvard University. Her mother died of cervical cancer during her sophomore year. After graduating from Harvard in 1991, Joseph attended Columbia University. She continued her education at Columbia College University of Physicians & Surgeons and Columbia University Mailman School of Public Health where she earned a joint M.D.-M.P.H. degree. Ken Ford, Joseph's surgery instructor at Columbia College University of Physicians & Surgeons, inspired Joseph to become a surgeon.

After earning her M.D.-M.P.H. in 1995, Joseph worked at New York University Medical Center to complete her seven-year surgical residency. After completing her surgical residency, Joseph earned a two-year fellowship at NYU Medical Center in surgical oncology. Following the surgical oncology residency, she then earned a fellowship in breast oncology at Columbia. In 2003, Joseph was appointed an assistant professor of surgery at Columbia.

== Research ==
Joseph's research includes studying a cell surface receptor molecule called RAGE which plays a role in tumor growth. In addition to RAGE, Joseph also focuses her research on risk factors associated with cancer including genetics, age, race, and ethnicity. Joseph's research works to find proper treatment for breast cancer and improve the overall quality of breast cancer care. She is a proponent of expanding genetic testing for people of African-American descent along with other ethnic backgrounds to increase the pool of known genetic information in order to improve breast cancer diagnosis and treatment, noting that the Gail Model for assessing breast-cancer risk has not been validated for communities of color. She is also involved in testing new equipment that uses infrared rays to detect lesions, and in 2017, led a study to treat benign tumors with high intensity frequency ultrasound.

== Achievements and award ==
While attending Harvard University, Joseph was awarded the Hoopes Prize for Excellence in Undergraduate Research for her thesis called Triple Jeopardy: Elderly, Poor, African-American Women and Their Barriers to Health Care and Screening for Breast and Cervical Cancer. In 2002, she was awarded the first Women at Risk Breast Surgery Fellowship by Columbia University Medical Center. Throughout her career, she has become a recipient of the Southwest Oncology Group Young Investigator, the 2004 AACR Minority Scholar Award in Cancer Research, the Joanne Masin Breast Cancer Alliance Young Investigator Award, and the Susan G. Komen Greater NYC Gay Clark Stoddard Compassionate Care Award. Joseph was the first African-American woman to be appointed to the faculty at New York-Presbyterian Hospital/Columbia University Medical Center in the Department of Surgery.

Joseph was chosen as one of New York's "40 Under 40" honorees in 2005 by Crain's New York Business, and in 2006 by The Network Journal. She was listed as one of New York Moves magazine's Power Women in 2005, and was one of those interviewed in New York's 2018 series "Powerful Women Talk About Power". She was named one of America's leading doctors in 2008, by Black Enterprise magazine. She was considered by Essence in 2009 to be one of the year's 25 Most Influential African Americans. In 2016, she was included in the list of top 10 Caribbean-born female doctors in the US, compiled by News Americas.
