= Kiros Berhane =

Ethiopian-born biostatistician and public health researcher

Kiros T. Berhane
- Education: Addis Ababa University (BSc); University of Guelph (MS); University of Toronto (PhD); Johns Hopkins University (postdoc)
- Known for: Statistical methods for longitudinal growth and latency modeling; Children's Health Study findings on air pollution and lung development
- Awards: Fellow, African Academy of Sciences (2025): Fellow of the American Statistical Association (2017); Fellow of the American Association for the Advancement of Science (2024)
- Scientific career
- Fields: Biostatistics; Environmental epidemiology; Global health
- Workplaces: Columbia University; University of Southern California

Kiros T. Berhane is an Ethiopian–American biostatistician noted for methodological work in environmental epidemiology and for team-science contributions linking ambient and traffic-related air pollution to impaired lung-function growth in adolescents—and later demonstrating lung growth improvements with cleaner air. As of 2025 he is Chair of Biostatistics at Columbia University's Mailman School of Public Health and serves on the Science magazine Board of Reviewing Editors; he is also an elected Fellow of the American Association for the Advancement of Science and of the American Statistical Association.

== Education ==
Berhane earned a BSc in statistics and mathematics from Addis Ababa University, an MS in statistics from the University of Guelph, and a PhD in biostatistics from the University of Toronto. He completed a postdoctoral fellowship at Johns Hopkins University.

== Career ==
Berhane joined the Graduate School of Public Health at the University of Pittsburgh, where he was an assistant professor of family medicine and clinical epidemiology in the School of Medicine and an assistant professor of biostatistics, with research interests in nonparametric regression, longitudinal data analysis, and time-series methods.

He later moved to the Keck School of Medicine of the University of Southern California, where he became a professor of preventive medicine in the Division of Biostatistics and directed the school's epidemiology and biostatistics graduate degree programs. From 2011 to 2019 he served as director of graduate programs in biostatistics and epidemiology at USC. At USC he served as lead biostatistician for the Children's Health Study (CHS), a series of longitudinal cohort studies that provided evidence that long-term exposure to ambient air pollution slows lung function growth and worsens respiratory symptoms in children.

In January 2020 Berhane was appointed Cynthia and Robert Citrone-Roslyn and Leslie Goldstein Professor of Biostatistics and Chair of the Department of Biostatistics at the Columbia University Mailman School of Public Health. He directs the Center for Achieving Resilience in Climate and Health (C-ARCH) at Columbia, a climate and health "solutions lab" he co-leads with environmental health scientist Darby Jack that develops and evaluates strategies to build resilience to climate-related health risks, with an emphasis on partnerships with governments and communities and on research capacity building in regions such as Eastern Africa.

Berhane serves on various leadership capacities within the NIH-funded Data Science Initiative for Africa (DS-I Africa), such as the Contact Principal Investigator of the Advancing Public Health Research for Eastern Africa through Data Science Training (APHREA-DST) training project, and as a member of the steering committee for the DS-I Africa Consortium.

Outside academia, Berhane writes poetry in Tigrinya, Amharic and English and shares his work on the Ethiopian online literary site Meskot and on his YouTube "Literature Channel".

== Research and contributions ==
=== Children's Health Study findings on air pollution and lung growth ===
As a biostatistician in the CHS, he co-authored studies that provided longitudinal evidence that contemporary ambient air pollution slows adolescents' lung development (NEJM, 2004), and that living near heavy traffic is associated with impaired lung-function growth (The Lancet, 2007). He also co-authored the NEJM report showing that cleaner regional air was associated with measurably better lung growth in adolescents (2015); contemporaneous coverage described it as "for the first time" linking improved air quality to better lung development in children.

=== Methodological contributions ===
Berhane has developed and helped spread new statistical methods for studying how health measures change over time and how the timing and amount of exposure to workplace and environmental hazards are linked to later disease risk. With Nuoo-Ting Molitor, he introduced an approach that looks at the overall shape of a person's growth curve over time (for example, when growth speeds up most) and connects those features to environmental conditions such as air pollution; this work grew out of analyses of lung growth in the CHS.

In studies where cancers may appear many years after exposure, he co-authored one of the early methods that uses smooth curves ("splines") to describe how cancer risk changes with time since exposure, using data from the Colorado Plateau Uranium Miners cohort. He later helped develop a more flexible version of this idea that looks at age, time since exposure, and exposure level together, to better describe how long-term or repeated exposures affect disease risk (Statistics in Medicine, 2008).

He has written about statistical challenges in long-term studies of air pollution and children's health, including how to capture adolescent growth spurts and other biologically meaningful features of children's lung function over time.

Berhane has also contributed to genetic and gene–environment interaction studies in asthma and childhood obesity, including work on nitric oxide synthase and arginase polymorphisms and exhaled nitric oxide in children, and on TGF-β1 promoter variants and susceptibility to early-onset childhood asthma.

=== Tigray ===
During the 2020–2022 war in the Tigray region of Ethiopia, Berhane joined other members of the Global Society of Tigray Scholars and Professionals in documenting the public health consequences of the conflict, serving as a co-author of a BMJ Global Health assessment of war-related damage to Tigray's health system and a subsequent community-based BMJ Global Health study of war-related sexual and gender-based violence. He was a signatory to an International Diabetes Federation appeal calling for urgent restoration of access to insulin and other essential medicines.

== Honors and awards ==
- Fellow, African Academy of Sciences (2025)
- Elected Member, International Statistical Institute (2025).
- Fellow, American Association for the Advancement of Science (2024).
- J. Warren Perry Distinguished Lecturer (2024), University at Buffalo.
- Fellow, American Statistical Association (2017).
- Fulbright U.S. Scholar (Ethiopia, 2016–2017).

== Professional service and leadership ==
- Member, Board of Reviewing Editors, Science (AAAS).
- Member, Committee on Assessing Causality from a Multidisciplinary Evidence Base for National Ambient Air Quality Standards, National Academies of Sciences, Engineering, and Medicine.
- Member, U.S. Environmental Protection Agency Science Advisory Board (2017 roster).
- Member, Health Effects Institute Review Committee.
- Core Panel, Lancet Initiative on the Future of Health and Economic Resiliency in Africa (FHERA).

== Publications ==
=== Editorial boards ===
Berhane serves on the editorial or advisory boards of several scientific journals. He is an associate editor of the International Journal of Public Health, and has been a member of the editorial boards of Environmental Epidemiology and the Archives of Environmental & Occupational Health, as well as an advisory board member for the East African Journal of Health Sciences. He also serves on the Board of Reviewing Editors for Science, published by the American Association for the Advancement of Science (AAAS).

=== Peer-reviewed articles ===
In 2025, Google Scholar reported an h-index of 75, i10-index of 174 and 25,366 citations.

Selected articles:

- Gauderman WJ, Avol E, Gilliland FD, Vora H, Thomas D, Berhane K, et al. "The effect of air pollution on lung development from 10 to 18 years of age." N Engl J Med. 2004;351(11):1057–1067. doi:10.1056/NEJMoa040610. PMID: PMID 15356303.
- Gauderman WJ, Vora H, McConnell R, Berhane K, Gilliland F, Thomas DC, et al. "Effect of exposure to traffic on lung development from 10 to 18 years of age: a cohort study." Lancet. 2007;369(9561):571–577. doi:10.1016/S0140-6736(07)60037-3. PMID: PMID 17307103.
- Gauderman WJ, Urman R, Avol E, Berhane K, McConnell R, Rappaport E, et al. "Association of improved air quality with lung development in children." N Engl J Med. 2015;372(10):905–913. doi:10.1056/NEJMoa1414123. PMID: PMID 25738666.
- Berhane K, Molitor N-T. "A Bayesian approach to functional-based multilevel modeling of longitudinal data: Applications to environmental epidemiology." Biostatistics. 2008;9(4):686–699. doi:10.1093/biostatistics/kxm059. PMID: PMID 18349036; PMCID: PMC 2733176.
- Hauptmann M, Berhane K, Langholz B, Lubin JH. "Using splines to analyse latency in the Colorado Plateau Uranium Miners cohort." J Epidemiol Biostat. 2001;6(6):417–424. doi:10.1080/135952201317225444. PMID: PMID 11859827.
- Berhane K, Hauptmann M, Langholz B. "Using tensor product splines in modeling exposure–time–response relationships: Application to the Colorado Plateau Uranium Miners cohort." Stat Med. 2008;27(26):5484–5496. doi:10.1002/sim.3354. PMID: PMID 18613262; PMCID: PMC 3032879.
