= Katherine Keyes =

American epidemiologist

- Born: Edina, Minnesota, US
- Spouse: Jeffrey Wild (m. 2006, divorced)
- Children: Aidan n. wild

Academic background
- Education: BA, BS, 2001, University of Minnesota; MPH, 2006, PhD, 2010, Columbia University Mailman School of Public Health
- Thesis: Ecologic-level disapproval and the prevalence of substance use: a multi-level age-period-cohort analysis of high-school attending adolescents in the United States (2010)

Katherine Margaret Keyes is an American epidemiologist. She is a professor of epidemiology at the Columbia University Mailman School of Public Health. Her research focuses on psychiatric and substance use epidemiology across the life course, including early origins of child and adult health and cross-generational cohort effects on substance use, mental health, and injury outcomes including suicide and overdose.

== Early life and education ==
Keyes graduated from the University of Minnesota with a Bachelor of Arts in theatre arts and Bachelor of Science in business in 2001 before enrolling at Columbia University Mailman School of Public Health for her Master's degree in public health and PhD.

== Career ==
Upon completing her PhD, Keyes began her post-doctoral fellowship at Columbia from 2011 until 2012. In this role, she was the senior author on a literature review of 31 peer-reviewed and published studies conducted in six countries on alcohol consumption, disorders, and mortality. The result of the study found that people born after World War II were more likely to binge drink and develop alcohol use disorders. She also reviewed 31 international studies of birth-cohort and gender differences in alcohol consumption and mortality to conclude that "those born between 1978 and 1983 are the weekend warriors, drinking to black out. In that age group, there is a reduction in male drinking, and a sharp increase for women."

As an assistant professor of epidemiology, Keyes was the recipient of a 2015–2016 Calderone Junior Faculty Award to fund "innovative data input methods to create synthetic survey-nonrespondent observations, leading to more accurate national estimates of alcohol and tobacco use across several population subgroups." In February, Keyes was the lead author on the first comprehensive evaluation of recent sleep trends by age and time period for U.S. adolescents called "The Great Sleep Recession: Changes in Sleep Duration Among U.S. Adolescents, 1991-2012." In the report, she found that female students, racial/ethnic minorities, and students of lower socioeconomic status were the most likely to be sleep-deprived. Her research team also analyzed 7,191 fatal accidents involving drivers between the ages of 16 and 25 from nine states and found that 50.3% of them tested positive for alcohol, marijuana or both.

In 2016, Keyes was the senior author on a study examining the wage gap women experience and the mental health disorders associates with it. The findings, which were based on data from a 2001–2002 United States population-representative sample of 22,581 working adults ages 30–65, found that American woman were diagnosed with depression at a higher rate than men. Keyes later received a five-year grant from the National Institute on Alcohol Abuse and Alcoholism for her research project "Age, Period, and Cohort Effects on Gender Differences in Alcohol Use and Alcohol Use Disorders in 47 National, Longitudinally-Followed Cohorts." She also co-authored the first study to estimate the prevalence of Flakka use among adolescents in the United States.

During the COVID-19 pandemic, Keyes was the senior author on a study which refuted claims that adolescents' heavy use of social media increased the risk of depression. In response to the findings, Keyes said that "daily social media use does not capture the diverse ways in which adolescents use social media, which may be both positive and negative depending on the social context." She was the recipient of the Carol J. Rowland Hogue Mid Career Award in recognition of her "research on psychiatric and substance use epidemiology across the lifecourse, including early origins of child and adult health and cross-generational cohort effects on substance use, mental health, and injury outcomes including suicide and overdose." She also sits on the editorial board of the Injury Epidemiology and Drug and Alcohol Dependence journals.
