= Karin B. Michels =

Epidemiologist

Karin B. Michels is an epidemiologist currently serving as the Chair of the Department of Epidemiology for the Fielding School of Public Health at the University of California, Los Angeles.

== Education ==
Michels received her BS-equivalent degree from the University of Freiburg Medical School, MS in epidemiology from the Columbia University School of Public Health, MPH from the Harvard School of Public Health, ScD in epidemiology from the Harvard School of Public Health, MS in medical statistics from the London School of Hygiene & Tropical Medicine and a PhD in biostatistics from the University of Cambridge.

== Research and career ==
Michels' areas of interest include epigenetic, breast cancer, and nutritional epidemiology.

From 2000 to 2015, Michels served as an associate professor at Harvard Medical School's Department of Obstetrics, Gynecology, and Reproductive Biology at Brigham and Women's Hospital. There, she utilized data from large epidemiologic cohort studies and population databases to explore links between diet and health, particularly cancer. Her research there also includes finding risk factors for breast cancer as well as the impact of the intrauterine environment on long-term health. She currently leads one of the BCERP (Breast Cancer and the Environment Research Program) Centers to study the role of environmental toxins of breast cancer risk.

Since 2008, Michels has served as a full professor of cancer epidemiology for the Medical Center at the University of Freiburg. Since 2013, she has served as the director for the Institute for Prevention and Cancer Epidemiology.

In 2016, Michels was appointed as the new chair and a new professor of epidemiology by the UCLA Fielding School of Public Health.

She is best known as a co-founder of epigenetic epidemiology, where she studies the relation between epigenetics and the developmental origins of health and disease (DoHaD). Her research often centers on longitudinal studies of a cohort, focusing on understanding of human microbiome in early life health and development. Her other notable work include methodological contributions to nutritional epidemiology and researching ways to prevent cancer through improved diets.
