= Nigel Paneth =

English pediatrician and epidemiologist

- Born: Nigel Sefton Paneth; 19 September 1946 (age 80); London, England
- Education: Columbia College; Dartmouth Medical School; Harvard Medical School; Columbia University Mailman School of Public Health
- Known for: Research on causes of cerebral palsy
- Scientific career
- Fields: Epidemiology; Pediatrics
- Workplaces: Michigan State University

Nigel Sefton Paneth (born 19 September 1946) is an English pediatrician and epidemiologist who serves as Professor of Epidemiology and Biostatistics and Pediatrics at Michigan State University. He is known for his research on the causes of childhood neurodevelopmental disorders such as cerebral palsy. He formerly served as a designer and principal investigator for the National Children's Study.
