= Alfred F. Kelly Jr. =

American business executive

Alfred F. Kelly, Jr.
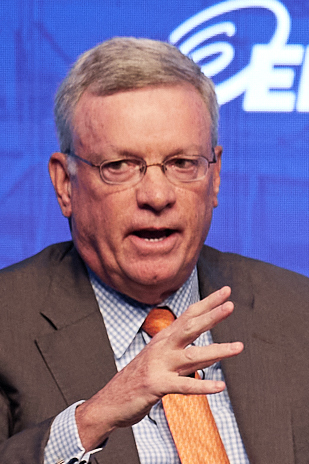
- Kelly in 2023
- Born: 1958 or 1959 (age 67–68); Bronxville, New York, U.S.
- Education: Iona University
- Known for: Executive Chairman of Visa Inc.
- Spouse: Peggy Kelly (m. 1983)
- Children: 5

Alfred Francis Kelly Jr. (born 1958 or 1959) is an American business executive. Until February 2023, he was the chairman and chief executive officer (CEO) of Visa Inc., a global digital payments company. In October 2016, Kelly succeeded Charles W. Scharf as the CEO of Visa. In April 2019, Kelly was elected as the company's Chair of the Board while continuing to serve as Visa's CEO.

Kelly serves on the Board of Directors of Catalyst and is chair of the board of the Mother Cabrini Health Foundation, as well as several entities in the Archdiocese of New York. He is also a member of the Board of Trustees of New York Presbyterian Hospital and Boston College, where four of his five children have graduated.

In 2020, Kelly was named a guardian for the Council for Inclusive Capitalism with the Vatican, which answers the call of Pope Francis to apply principles of morality to business and investment practices.

== Early life and education ==
Kelly was born in Bronxville, New York, and raised in the Crestwood section of Yonkers (both in Westchester County). Kelly graduated from the Iona Preparatory School in 1976. He received a Bachelor of Arts degree in Computer and Information Science (summa cum laude) in 1980 and an MBA with Honors in 1981, both from Iona College, a private Catholic college in New Rochelle, New York. He also served as an adjunct assistant professor at Iona and was a trustee for 13 years.

== Career ==
Early in his career, Kelly held various positions in information systems and financial planning at PepsiCo Inc. from 1981 to 1985. When President Ronald Reagan won re-election in 1984, Kelly was named Head of Information Systems at the White House at just 27 years of age and served in that capacity from 1985 to 1987. Kelly spent the majority of his early career at American Express where he worked from 1987 to 2010. Over those 23 years, he held several senior positions, including serving as president from July 2007 to April 2010.

From April 2011 to August 2014, Kelly left the corporate world to take on the role of President and CEO for the 2014 NY/NJ Super Bowl Host Committee to organize the Super Bowl XLVIII. In addition to successfully executing the event, the Host Committee supported charitable efforts including the Super Community Blood Drive; the Urban Forestry Project, an environmental program that planted 25,000 trees in areas that were ravaged by Hurricane Sandy; and the Snowflake Youth Foundation, which aims to revitalize and rebuild facilities for school-age kids like playgrounds, community houses and Boys & Girls Clubs.

While serving as management advisor to TowerBrook Capital Partners in 2015, Kelly became the Chairman of the Papal Visit Committee for Pope Francis’ visit to New York, which included a papal tour of New York City and a mass at Madison Square Garden. Immediately prior to joining Visa, Kelly was president and CEO at Intersection, a technology and digital media company and Alphabet-backed private company based in New York City.

== Personal life ==
Kelly is the oldest of seven children. Kelly's father was president of the Canada Life Insurance Company of New York and a company CEO. His grandfather, the late Raymond J. Kelly, was sports editor of The New York Times from 1937 to 1958.

Kelly is a second-generation Irish-American with roots in Cork, Ireland. He resides in Westchester County with his wife Margaret “Peggy” Joan Parlatore Kelly. They were married in 1983 and have five children.
