= Dolores Malaspina =

American psychiatrist

Dolores Malaspina M.D., M.S., MSPH is an American psychiatrist and director of the psychiatry program at the Icahn School of Medicine at Mount Sinai and the Anita Steckler and Joseph Steckler Professor of Psychiatry at New York University School of Medicine and the director of InSPIRES, the Institute for Social and Psychiatric Initiatives (Research, Education, and Services).

== Education ==
She completed a Clinical Research Fellowship and earned a Master's of Science in Epidemiology from the Mailman School of Public Health. She also earned a BA in Environmental Biology from Boston University and an MS in Zoology from Rutgers University before graduating from NJ Medical School in 1983.

== Career ==
Malaspina served as Chairman of the NYU Bellevue Department of Psychiatry and an editor of the DSM-5.

== Select publications ==
- Differential Targeting of the CA1 Subfield of the Hippocampal Formation by Schizophrenia and Related Psychotic Disorders
