= Ernest S. Tierkel =

Epidemiologist (1917–1981)

Ernest Shalom Tierkel (July 2, 1917 – November 2, 1981) was an epidemiologist, whose lifelong work in implementing vaccine programs eliminated rabies as a major public health concern in the United States. His work then spread through the World Health Organization (WHO) to the rest of the world. Tierkel came to be known as “Dr. Rabies.”

== Early life ==
=== Family ===
His father David Baer Tierkel and his mother Esther Ginsberg Tierkel ensured that their children had all of the strong values that they had brought with them as Jewish immigrants from Ukraine.

Before Ernest was born, Tierkel's father and his family arrived at Ellis Island in the United States on August 1, 1893, on the German ship Meier after a long immigration from the small village of Moliv, in Ukraine. Tierkel's grandfather, Fischel Tierkel, decided that the continued violence against the Jews in Ukraine was not sustainable for raising his family. The family set off for a better life with Fischel, his wife Rachel, son David, and daughters Lura, Emma, and Ethel. They tried living in Heidelberg, Germany for a few years, where David, the eldest child, enrolled in the University, but found that Jews were not met with hospitality in Germany either. The family then set off for the United States. After arriving at Ellis Island on a hot August day in 1893, the Tierkel family eventually settled in Philadelphia, Pennsylvania, where a large Eastern-European Jewish population was thriving.

Ernest Tierkel's childhood was driven by a set of values that prioritized education and intellectual pursuit in the Talmudic tradition. Service to the greater society was stressed at all levels of life. Tierkel's father, David, was an author of a number of books, essays, articles, and plays. His father was a tireless advocate for worldwide Zionism as well as a member of a number of scientific institutes. As David B. Tierkel worked to become editor and publisher of a number of newspapers in Philadelphia, Tierkel was surrounded by a focus on academics, poetry, history, and community service. Tierkel's brother Arnold was an accomplished artist, having attended the Philadelphia School of Art and studying in Italy after the war. Both Tierkel and his sister Doris attended and graduated from the University of Pennsylvania.

Tierkel's mother had a significant role in running the family business, taking charge of the family newspaper after the death of Tierkel's father in 1948. The children in the house would help publish their newspaper, helping with the typesetting and eventually contributing writing and editing on a wide and varied array of subjects. This environment provided Tierkel with his love of science, theater, history, community, and Zionism. Many nights were spent at the theater or the opera, using the free tickets that came to the newspaper's offices.

But it was not all work at the Tierkel household. During the summers, Esther and the children would spend time in Atlantic City, building sand castles, strolling on the boardwalk, and enjoying the big bands on Atlantic City Pier. This instilled a love of the ocean in Tierkel for the rest of his life that he would pass on to his children. The family's network of friends that they established were from varied walks of life, giving the children a great view into many cultures. Tierkel's mother was also as a friend of Eleanor Roosevelt.

=== Education ===
This exposure to the wide culture of the world set the foundation for Tierkel's later life. It gave him the drive and passion to learn all that he could about the world around him. Tierkel was a serious student and took advantage of the great public school system of Philadelphia and graduated with honors in June 1930 from the Horace Binney School and then in 1934 from the acclaimed Central High School (Philadelphia). An early example of his service was as chairman of the Student Patrol at Central High School.

It was not until his university experience at the University of Pennsylvania, out from under the strict nature of home, that Tierkel began to travel and broaden his life pursuits. Before graduating from Penn with his Bachelor of Arts in 1938, he spent a semester at the University of Virginia and gained his love of southern hospitality and culture—which would play an important role in Tierkel's life. Tierkel then continued on to the medical school at University of Pennsylvania and to receive his V.M.D. in 1942. Tierkel continued his education in public health at Columbia University in New York City, where he was awarded his master's degree in Public Health in 1945.

== Epidemiology ==
=== USDA ===
Having spent the majority of his life in Philadelphia while growing up, attending college and medical school, Tierkel was then attracted to New York City, where he joined the Department of Agriculture Bureau of Animal Industry as a Public Health Veterinarian Pathologist. Tierkel found a bachelor's apartment in New York City with his childhood friend Dr. Ernest Witt, with whom he had attended to high school, university, and medical school. During his tenure at the Department of Agriculture, he realized there were a great deal of opportunity to solve many public health issues to solve in the country. It was his USDA role that convinced Tierkel of these opportunities. While at the Department of Agriculture, Tierkel saw that as a public health advocate and scientist he could have a great impact on the world. With this in mind he attended Columbia University and received his master's degree in Public Health in 1945 while still working at the USDA.

=== Public Health Service ===
While attending a conference on animal health at the New York Academy of Sciences, Tierkel met Dr. Jim Steele. These future friends hit it off immediately. Jim Steele convinced Tierkel the best place to effect change in public health in the United States was the United States Public Health Service. With Steele's advice in mind, Tierkel sought and received an appointment as a scientist with the U.S. Public Health Service upon receipt of his masters.

Once his appointment as a scientist to the PHS came, Tierkel was off on his first assignment in Richmond, Virginia. While stationed in Richmond, Tierkel spent time traveling to Washington, D.C. At a dinner at Joe and Amy Dean's house that he met many of the other scientists who had come into the PHS that year, including Art Wolf, Ray Pagan, Ray Helvig, Ted Price, and Oscar Sussman. Tierkel was then quickly appointed as the officer-in-charge of the rabies unit at the CDC Virus lab in Montgomery, Alabama. This was the beginning of a lifelong productive career in implementing vaccines and programs that would eliminate rabies as a major public health concern in the United States. His work was then spread through the WHO to the rest of the world. Indeed, Tierkel came to be known as “Dr. Rabies”.

=== Dr. Rabies ===
In the summer of 1946 Tierkel applied to the USPHS for appointment as a scientist and came to Washington D.C. Tierkel then went to Montgomery, Alabama when he found out that the Rockefeller Rabies Laboratory was available. Tierkel was the first member of the CDC on the scene. Tierkel's basic work with Martha Edson and Bob Kissling evaluating the new chicken embryo rabies vaccine, which set the basis for rabies control in the U.S. Later the same evaluation was made of polio vaccine based on the same methods. In 1946 there were 10,000 cases of canine rabies every year reported in the United States. By 1975 there were only 129 cases of canine rabies reported in the United States. This dramatic success was due to the immunization program that resulted from Tierkel's work.

The work on rabies that Tierkel led to a national program, which, within a few years, resulted in the elimination of urban rabies as a major public health problem in the United States. Where several thousand humans died each year from rabies, the toll eventually fell to just a few cases, and even zero in some years. It was during this period that Tierkel became internationally recognized. The principles he developed began to be applied in other countries, and many deaths were prevented there too. He became known as "Mr. Rabies," but he went on to make contributions in other fields of communicable disease control through the Agency for International Development.

=== World health community ===
Tierkel spent a great deal of time as a member of the international health community. His love of different cultures allowed him to enjoy every assignment that brought him to new and varied landscapes. Whether it was Geneva, working with the WHO on global rabies control, or New Delhi, where he spent 3 years working with AID on communicable disease control and zoonoses, Tierkel savored the world around him. As a frequent speaker at Harvard University, Columbia University, Johns Hopkins University, Emory University, and the University of Georgia, Tierkel was able to pass his knowledge on to others. Tierkel capped his career when he was appointed assistant surgeon general in 1968.

=== Assistant surgeon general ===
He put a capstone on his PHS career when he was promoted to the rank of assistant surgeon general and given very broad responsibilities as director of the Office of Science and a special assistant to the assistant secretary for health in the Department of Health, Education and Welfare. As an additional responsibility, he also became the PHS chief veterinary officer upon the retirement of his old friend and mentor, Jim Steele.

=== Retirement from The Public Health Service ===
Tierkel retired from the PSPHS on March 29, 1973, but not from active professional life. Upon retirement from the PHS, Tierkel settled his family in Delaware. There he was able to reconnect with public health at a local level as Director of the Bureau of Disease Control and Chief Epidemiologist for the State of Delaware.

=== Chief epidemiologist for the State of Delaware ===
In Delaware, Tierkel was able to focus on a wide array of public health issues ranging from rubella to swine flu to Legionnaires' disease to tuberculosis to Rocky Mountain Spotted Fever to lead poisoning. Tierkel's hallmark in these years was in instituting programs that utilized effective communication with the citizenry as well as well-structured programs to reduce mortality. Tierkel spent tireless hours working with the legislature on funding for new health programs that improved the quality of life in Delaware immeasurably.

== Personal life ==
In between all of this passionate pursuit of science, Tierkel found time for other passions, most notably the love of his life Ruby Reams Tierkel. Tierkel met Ruby at the officer's club at Ft. McPherson in Atlanta, where they were both living. Tierkel asked Ruby if he might call on her for dinner some time and she said, “Of course.” Tierkel called one Sunday afternoon and asked Ruby out for dinner that night with Ruby replying, “Are you kidding? Tonight? The next time you call, please have the courtesy to plan ahead!”. Not to be deterred, Tierkel, who was off to Europe for a WHO meeting the next day, sent Ruby a telegram from Geneva, asking if she might select a suitable evening that she was free for them to have dinner. They married on July 13, 1958.

The world-traveling bachelor now entered a new phase of his life—family man. Tierkel valued becoming a father to his new stepson, Mike Steele, Ruby's son from a previous marriage. Soon Tierkel and Ruby had another son, whom they named after Tierkel's father, David Baer Tierkel. The family was noted to be close. Mike went on to attend the Citadel and followed a notable career in the U.S. Army, retiring as a lieutenant general. Mike and his wife Pam and their two children Lara and Cari positively impacted Tierkel's life. He valued the time that he was able to spend with his grandchildren. David went on to Boston University and followed a career in software technology as an entrepreneur helping to found several companies. David's wife Alison and children Chaya and Ezekiel live in Amherst, Massachusetts and continue to talk about their grandfather and his strong sense of life.

One of the great foundations that his parents gave to Tierkel was his love of life, which combined with his intellectual upbringing, spurred his interest in public health. Tierkel's entire career and life was dedicated to making the world a better place in which people could live and realize their dreams.

== Influences ==
There were many people who influenced Tierkel's path into public health. Certainly Tierkel's parents, who stressed public service with an intellectual bent provided a lifelong foundation for Tierkel's efforts. His old childhood friend Ernie Witt, with whom he attended elementary, high school, university, and medical school had a great influence on entering the veterinary area. Most of all, though it was James H. Steele, who served as a mentor and guide throughout Tierkel's career from his induction to the officer corps of the Public Health Service through his retirement as Assistant Surgeon General. Another close colleague of Tierkel was Joe Held, a member of the CDC and PHS scientist for whom Tierkel had great respect.

== Publications ==
- "Effective Control of an outbreak of Rabies in Memphis and Shelby County, Tennessee", by Ernest S. Tierkel and Lloyd M. Graves
- "Rabies; Methods in Laboratory Diagnosis", by Ernest S. Tierkel
- "Rabies Control in Israel", by Ernest S. Tierkel

== Positions, memberships and accreditations ==
=== Positions ===
- Veterinary Pathologist, U.S. Department of Agriculture, 1942–45
- U.S. Public Health Service 1946-73
- Officer-in-Charge, Rabies Research Unit, Virus Lab, CDC, USPHS, 1946–49
- Assistant Chief, Veterinary Public Health Programs, CDC, USPHS, 1950–52
- Consultant, Veterinary Public Health, VA State Health Dept, USPHS, 1953–54
- Director, National Rabies Control Program, CDC, USPHS, 1954–64
- Deputy Director, Health Services, AID, USPHS, 1964–66
- Consultant, Zoonooses & Veterinary Epidemiology, AID, New Delhi India, 1966–68
- Assistant Surgeon General, Director, Office of Science, HEW, USPHS, 1968–73
- Chief, Bureau of Disease Control, Epidemiologist, State of Delaware, 1973–81

=== Concurrent position ===
- Public Health Service Chief Veterinary Officer
- Diplomate, American Board of Veterinary Public Health, 1954
- Member, Rabies Expert Panel, WHO, 1950–81
- Member, Rabies Expert Committee, WHO, Rome, 1953
- Member, Rabies Expert Committee, WHO, Paris, 1956 and 1961
- Member, Rabies Expert Committee, WHO, Geneva, 1959 and 1965
- U.S. Delegate to the 15th International Veterinary Congress
- Member, Zoonooses Expert Panel, WHO, 1964–81
- Member, Zoonooses Expert Committee, WHO, Geneva, 1966
- Visiting Lecturer, University of Pennsylvania, 1953, 1960–66, 1973–78
- Visiting Lecturer, Harvard University, 1953
- Visiting Lecturer, University of Georgia, 1953–54, 1960–64
- Visiting Lecturer, Columbia University, 1954–55
- Visiting Lecturer, Emory University, 1959, 1960–63
- Visiting Lecturer, Johns Hopkins University, 1964–65

=== Memberships ===
- AAAS
- Sigma Xi
- U.S. Association of Military Surgeons, Executive Council
- Fellow, American Public Health Association
- National Conference of Public Health Veterinarians
- American Veterinary Health Association

=== Degrees and certifications ===
- Bachelor of Arts in Science, University of Pennsylvania, 1938
- V.M.D, University of Pennsylvania School of Medicine, 1942
- Master of Public Health, Columbia Mailman School of Public Health, 1945
- Commonwealth of Virginia State Board of Veterinary Examiners Certification July 29, 1942.
- Commonwealth of Pennsylvania State Board of Veterinary Medical Examiners Certification July 15, 1942.
- State of Maryland Veterinary Medical Board certification June 6, 1942.
- Chemical Corps School of the United States Army Certificate of Proficiency in Chemical Warfare, Radiological Defense, and Military Biology.
- Member American Public Health Association, April 1944
- The American Board of Veterinary Public Health Certification August 23, 1954.
