= Deborah Maine =

American public health expert

Deborah Maine is a US public health expert, epidemiologist and Professor of International health. UNFPA has credited her and her advocacy for better maternal health care as having helped save millions of lives. She directed the Averting Maternal Death and Disability Program (AMDD), which doubled the capacity for emergency obstetric care in several places in West Africa.

== Life ==
Maine studied anthropology at university, and began her career working with Margaret Mead at the Museum of Natural History, New York. She later turned to public health and epidemiology, and worked together with Allan Rosenfield within the field of international health to make sure that mothers are not left behind in the efforts to save children. In 1985, Maine and Rosenfield published the article Maternal Mortality – A Neglected Tragedy: Where is the M in MCH? in The Lancet, an article that drew attention to deaths of women in the third-world in pregnancy and childbirth. Efforts were made to improve access to health care for pregnant women in response to the article by international health groups. Their work helped give global attention to preventable maternal death. According to UNFPA, her advocacy for better maternal health care and access to emergency obstetric care might have saved millions of lives.

Maine has worked with women's reproductive health for thirty years, and during most of these years at the School of Public Health at Columbia University. Her main academic focus has been maternal morbidity and mortality. Between 1987 and 2005 Maine directed two international programs: The Prevention of Maternal Mortality Program, funded by the Carnegie Foundation, and The Averting Maternal Death and Disability Program (AMDD), funded by the Bill & Melinda Gates Foundation. The Prevention of Maternal Mortality Program gave technical support to eleven multidisciplinary teams in West Africa between 1987 and 1996. While the maternal health care got better, Maine identified a lack of focus on emergency obstetric care, and received the funds from the Gates Foundation to directly address the emergency care at hospitals in the region. The program received US$56 million from 1999 to 2005, and then received another $10 million for the second phase of the program. The program worked together with intergovernmental organizations such as UNICEF to scale up the work, and within the first 2–3 years, the capacity for emergency obstetric care in the region doubled. The Gates Foundation in its evaluation of the program stated that it "helped to fill a significant gap in global programming for maternal health. AMDD’s technical, programmatic, and financial assistance to implementing partners has greatly improved the quality and effectiveness of maternal health services. The worldwide scale of the AMDD project is unprecedented among safe motherhood programs."

Since 2005 she works at Boston University's School of Public Health, as a professor of international health and member of the Center for International Health and Development (CIHD). She has continued the focus on maternal morbidity and mortality, and also researched cervical cancer extensively.
