= Eleanor Leacock =

American anthropologist

- Born: July 2, 1922; Weehawken, US
- Died: April 2, 1987 (aged 64); Honolulu, US
- Education: Columbia University
- Spouses: Richard Leacock (m. 1941–1962) James Haughton (m. 1966–1987)
- Awards: 1983 New York Academy Sciences Award for the Behavioral Sciences
- Scientific career
- Fields: Anthropology
- Thesis: The Montagnais "Hunting Territory" and the Fur Trade (1954)

Eleanor Burke Leacock (July 2, 1922 – April 2, 1987) was an American anthropologist and social theorist who made major contributions to the study of egalitarian societies, the evolution of the status of women in society, Marxism, and the feminist movement.

== Early life and education ==
Leacock was born on July 2, 1922, in Weehawken, New Jersey, the second of three daughters. Her mother, Lily Mary Battherham, was a mathematician who taught secondary school and her father was the literary critic and philosopher Kenneth Burke. Leacock was raised between the family's apartment in Greenwich Village, New York and their northern New Jersey 150-acre farm, living half of the year in each place. Living in a social circle that included artists, political radicals and intellectuals prompted into Leacock an ideal "to be scornful of materialist consumerism; to value—even revere—nature; to hate deeply the injustices of exploitation and racial discrimination...and to be committed to the importance of doing what one could to bring about a socialist transformation of society".

Leacock attended New York public schools during her childhood until her teenage years, when she got a scholarship to the prestigious private high school Dalton School. Also on scholarship, she started undergraduate courses in anthropology at Radcliffe College in 1939. At Radcliffe, she was introduced by Carleton S. Coon to the neo-evolutionary thought of V. Gordon Childe and C. Daryll Forde. She also became involved in studying Lewis H. Morgan and Karl Marx and in radical student politics. There she also met filmmaker Richard Leacock, whom she married in 1941. After curfew violations, Radcliffe authorities asked her to leave and she transferred to Barnard College in 1942. She studied under Gladys Reichard, graduating from Barnard in 1944 with a Bachelor of Arts degree in anthropology.

== Academic career ==
After receiving her graduate degree, Leacock traveled to Europe with her first husband while he was shooting films on human geography. It is during this time in Paris that she began researching the social changes in the fur trade amount the Montagnais-Naskapi people. In 1951 Leacock received a grant to conduct fieldwork in Labrador, Canada. During this time she brought her one-year-old son with her to Labrador. She used this fieldwork to challenge the idea that private property is universal.

She worked at Bank Street College of Education as a senior research associate, from 1958 to 1965, and at Polytechnic Institute of Brooklyn in the social sciences department, from 1963 to 1972. She struggled to get a full-time job during the 1950s due to her outspoken political views. She taught as an adjunct for decades before being appointed, in 1972, as a professor and chair of anthropology at City College (CCNY) and graduate faculty of City University of New York Graduate Center. Although highly qualified, Leacock credited her CCNY appointment to the rise of the women's movement and social pressure felt by City College to diversify its faculty. Her appointment coincided with the publication of her celebrated introduction to Friedrich Engels' The Origins of the Family, Private Property and the State. In that introduction, she cited contemporary research to further explicate Engels' theory that "the historic defeat of the female sex" and subjugation of women began with the stratification of society, the widespread practice of private property, and the emergence of a state.

It is not until 1971 that she does her next big fieldwork assignment in Zambia. During this time Zambia had not let many anthropologists into the country because of perceived colonist attitudes. This particular fieldwork aided Leacock in her research of the decolonization efforts in primary school education.

One of Leacock's most fruitful contributions to the field of anthropology was her essay in Dialectical Anthropology, entitled "Interpreting the Origins of Gender Inequality: Conceptual and Historical Problems" (1983), in which she discussed gender inequalities. Leacock's theories mainly concentrated on the relationships between race, class, gender, sexuality, and religion. And she refuted biological determinism as it relates to race, gender, and class. Leacock's work could be reflected in five areas: women's status in egalitarian societies, race, and gender in schools, culture of poverty studies, women's work in development, and the studies of race, class, and gender in Samoa. Arguing the roles of women in the hierarchical society, she claimed that some features of women become exploitable under the patriarchy system. Leacock interpreted the structure of marriage as the structure of exchange and the division of labor. The exploitation of women's labor within the household is the same.

Leacock's career involved four major regions: North America, Europe, Africa, and the Pacific. In these areas she studied various topics including the anthropology of education, women cross-culturally, foraging societies, etc.

Leacock died of a stroke on April 2, 1987, in Hawaii.

== Works and publications ==
- dissertation, The Montagnais "Hunting Territory" and the Fur Trade (American Anthropological Association (Memoir 78))
- Teaching and Learning in City Schools: A Comparative Study (NY: Basic Books, 1969)
- editor, A Culture of Poverty: Critique (NY: Simon & Schuster, 1971)
- Myths of Male Dominance (NY: Monthly Review Press, 1981)
- editor, then-recent edition, Morgan, Ancient Society
- editor, then-recent edition, Engels, Origin of the Family, Private Property and the State
- editor with Nancy Lurie, North American Indians in Historical Perspective (NY: Random House, 1971)
- author, essay, "Women's Status in Egalitarian Society: Implications for Social Evolution", Current Anthropology (1978, volume 19, issue 2)
