= Madelyn Gould =

American epidemiologist and researcher

Madelyn Gould is the Irving Philips Professor of Epidemiology in Psychiatry and a research scientist at the New York State Psychiatric Institute. She is also an epidemiologist with a focus on youth suicide.

== Education and training ==
Gould earned a Master of Public Health (MPH) with a focus on Epidemiology in 1976 from the Columbia University Mailman School of Public Health, followed by a PhD in Epidemiology (1980) from the Columbia Graduate School of Arts and Sciences and a fellowship (1979) at the Columbia University Mailman School of Public Health.

Gould received a Master of Arts degree from Princeton in 1974 and a Bachelor of Science degree from Brooklyn College in 1972.

== Career ==
Gould has evaluated the National Suicide Prevention Hotline founded by Substance Abuse and Mental Health Services Administration (SAMHSA).

== Awards and honors ==
- Shneidman Award for Research, American Association of Suicidology (AAS), 1991

== Selected publications ==
- Forum on Global Violence Prevention; Board on Global Health; Institute of Medicine; National Research Council. Contagion of Violence: Workshop Summary. Washington (DC): National Academies Press (US); 2013 Feb 6. II.4, THE CONTAGION OF SUICIDAL BEHAVIOR. Available from: https://www.ncbi.nlm.nih.gov/books/NBK207262/
- Pirkis, J; Gunnell, D; Shin, S; Del Pozo-Banos, M; Arya, V; Aguilar, PA; Appleby, L; Arafat, SMY; Arensman, E; Ayuso-Mateos, JL; Balhara, YPS; Bantjes, J; Baran, A; Behera, C; Bertolote, J; Borges, G; Bray, M; Brečić, P; Caine, E; Calati, R; Carli, V; Castelpietra, G; Chan, LF; Chang, SS; Colchester, D; Coss-Guzmán, M; Crompton, D; Ćurković, M; Dandona, R; De Jaegere, E; De Leo, D; Deisenhammer, EA; Dwyer, J; Erlangsen, A; Faust, JS; Fornaro, M; Fortune, S; Garrett, A; Gentile, G; Gerstner, R; Gilissen, R; Gould, M; Gupta, SK; Hawton, K; Holz, F; Kamenshchikov, I; Kapur, N; Kasal, A; Khan, M; Kirtley, OJ; Knipe, D; Kõlves, K; Kölzer, SC; Krivda, H; Leske, S; Madeddu, F; Marshall, A; Memon, A; Mittendorfer-Rutz, E; Nestadt, P; Neznanov, N; Niederkrotenthaler, T; Nielsen, E; Nordentoft, M; Oberlerchner, H; O'Connor, RC; Papsdorf, R; Partonen, T; Phillips, MR; Platt, S; Portzky, G; Psota, G; Qin, P; Radeloff, D; Reif, A; Reif-Leonhard, C; Rezaeian, M; Román-Vázquez, N; Roskar, S; Rozanov, V; Sara, G; Scavacini, K; Schneider, B; Semenova, N; Sinyor, M; Tambuzzi, S; Townsend, E; Ueda, M; Wasserman, D; Webb, RT; Winkler, P; Yip, PSF; Zalsman, G; Zoja, R; John, A; Spittal, MJ (2022). "Suicide numbers during the first 9-15 months of the COVID-19 pandemic compared with pre-existing trends: An interrupted time series analysis in 33 countries". EClinicalMedicine. 51 101573. doi:10.1016/j.eclinm.2022.101573. PMC 9344880. PMID 35935344.
