= Jess Lee =

Jess Lee may refer to:

- Jess Lee (Canadian singer), Canadian Métis country music singer-songwriter
- Jess Lee (Malaysian singer) (born 1988), Malaysian singer
- Jess Lee (business) (born 1982), partner at Sequoia Capital and the former chief executive officer of Polyvore

== See also ==
- Jess Lee Brooks (1894–1944), American actor
- Jessica Lee (disambiguation)
- Jesse Lee (disambiguation)
- Jessie Lee (disambiguation)
