= Jessie Lee =

Jessie Lee may refer to:

- Jessie Lee Elementary School
- Jessie Lee Hester, American football wide receiver
- Bonnie Lee a.k.a. Jessie Lee Frealls (1931–2006), American blues singer

== Fictional characters ==
- Jessie Lee, fictional character from the move Posse (1993 film)
- Jessie Lee, fictional character from the movie Gang of Roses
- "Jessie Lee", a song from the album Cucamonga (album)

== See also ==
- Jessica Lee (disambiguation)
- Jesse Lee (disambiguation)
- Jess Lee (disambiguation)
- Jessie Li (born 1992), Chinese actress
