= Arthur Schatzkin =

American epidemiologist (1948–2011)

Arthur Gould Schatzkin (February 11, 1948 in New York City – January 20, 2011 in Chevy Chase, Maryland) was an American nutritional epidemiologist who spent much of his career at the National Cancer Institute.

== Education ==
Schatzkin earned a bachelor's degree from Yale University in 1969. As an undergraduate, Schatzkin was active in Students for a Democratic Society, and after graduation from Yale he went to work for the university as a grounds maintenance worker. He remained an active leftist, including taking part in an occupation on behalf on another worker and speaking at a rally of striking Winchester workers, and in 1969 he was fired, arrested, and tried for his activism.

He earned an M.D. from the SUNY Downstate College of Medicine in 1976, and an M.P.H. and doctorate in public health from Columbia University Mailman School of Public Health. He completed residency training at Montefiore Medical Center (1979, internal medicine) and Mount Sinai Hospital (Manhattan) (1981, preventive medicine).

== Career ==
One of Schatzkin's first academic positions in his career was as an assistant professor of public health and medicine at Boston University. In 1984, he began working at the National Cancer Institute, where he became the chair of the Nutritional Epidemiology Branch in 1999.

== Research ==
Schatzkin's early research focused on the link between alcohol consumption and breast cancer. Later, during the 1990s, he led the Polyp Prevention Trial, which found that, contrary to conventional wisdom, fiber intake was not associated with the development of precancerous polyps. He was also the principal investigator for the NIH-AARP Diet and Health Study, which enrolled over 500,000 people and is one of the largest-ever diet and lifestyle studies. The study began in the mid-1990s and was still ongoing at the time of his death in 2011.

== Death ==
Schatzkin died on January 20, 2011, at his home in Chevy Chase, Maryland, at the age of 62. He had previously been suffering from brain cancer.
