= Laura Forese =

American pediatric orthopedic surgeon and hospital administrator

- Born: Laura Lee Forese; 1961 or 1962 (age 64–65)
- Education: Princeton University (BS); Columbia University Vagelos College of Physicians and Surgeons (MD); Columbia University Mailman School of Public Health (MPH)
- Occupations: hospital administrator, orthopedic surgeon
- Years active: 1993–present
- Title: EVP and COO of NewYork-Presbyterian Hospital
- Board member of: Princeton University; Cantel Medical Corporation (former); National Institutes of Health Clinical Center Research Hospital Board; Mother Cabrini Health Foundation; The Shubert Organization; Nereid Therapeutics
- Spouse: Robert Downey (m. 1988)
- Children: 3

Laura Lee Forese is an American pediatric orthopedic surgeon and hospital administrator. She was the Executive Vice-President and COO of NewYork-Presbyterian Hospital (NYP) until 2023.

== Biography ==
As an undergrad at Princeton University, Forese majored in Civil Engineering and Operations Research, but retained an interest in studying medicine. She graduated summa cum laude in 1983 and was a member of the Phi Beta Kappa honor society. She went on to study at Columbia University Vagelos College of Physicians and Surgeons, graduating in 1987, and was a member of Alpha Omega Alpha. At Columbia Presbyterian, she did her internship in general surgery and her residency in orthopedic surgery.

In 1993, she joined Helen Hayes Hospital and later became chief of surgery and anesthesia services She also continued as a faculty member at Columbia University. She received a Master of Public Health in Health Services Management from Columbia University Mailman School of Public Health in 1995. From 1998 to 2002, she was vice chair in the Department of Orthopedic Surgery at Columbia.

She joined NewYork-Presbyterian Hospital / Weill Cornell Medical Center in 2003 as the vice president of medical affairs. In 2005, she became the chief medical officer and senior vice president, and in 2006 she was also appointed the role of chief operating officer. In 2013, she became president of the NewYork-Presbyterian Healthcare System. In October 2015, following a reorganization of the group, she returned to NewYork-Presbyterian/Weill Cornell as the executive vice president and chief operating officer.

In 2019, Crain’s New York Business listed Forese at number 9 on their list of fifty Most Powerful Women in New York. A 2019 salary survey indicated she was the second-highest compensated executive in the hospital with a salary of $5,286,445.

In May 2022, Forese announced she was going to retire from NYP in January 2023. She was succeeded by Brian Donley. Donely, also an orthopedic surgeon, left his position of CEO of Cleveland Clinic London to join NYP.

== Other ventures ==
In 2015, Forese joined the board of trustees at Princeton University, where she is serving an eight-year term. She was also on the board of directors for Cantel Medical Corporation prior to its acquisition by Steris. In 2016, a major restructuring at the National Institutes of Health Clinical Center, resulted in her appointment as chairman of their Research Hospital Board.

In 2018, she joined the inaugural board for the Mother Cabrini Health Foundation. In 2021, she became a board member on the Shubert Organization which does theater production. She also joined the board on medical treatments company Nereid Therapeutics.

== Personal life ==
She married physician Robert Downey in 1988 when they were both residents at Presbyterian Hospital. They have three children. They lived in Franklin Lakes, New Jersey. In 2016, the American Cancer Society honored her as a Mother of the Year.
