= Jesse Lee =

Jesse Lee may refer to:

- Jesse Lee (Methodist) (1758–1816), American Methodist Episcopal clergyman and pioneer
- Jesse Lee (politician) (born 1979), White House Online Programs Director under the Barack Obama administration
- Jesse Lee (singer) (born 1987), American country music artist
- Jesse Lee, a gunslinger played by Mario Van Peebles in the 1993 film Posse
- Jesse Lee Soffer (born 1984), American actor sometimes credited as "Jesse Lee"

== See also ==
- Jessica Lee (disambiguation)
- Jessie Lee (disambiguation)
- Jess Lee (disambiguation)
