= James Haughton (activist) =

American civil rights activist (1929–2016)

James Haughton Jr
- Born: October 8, 1929; Brooklyn, New York City
- Died: April 17, 2016 (aged 86); Manhattan, New York City
- Education: City College of New York, New York University
- Spouse: Eleanor Leacock (m. 1966–1987)

James Haughton Jr. (October 8, 1929 – April 17, 2016) was a prominent American civil rights activist, labor leader, community organizer, and social worker. Haughton is most widely known for advocating for racial equality within construction industry unions.

== Personal life ==
James Haughton was born on October 8, 1929, in Brooklyn, New York to James Haughton Sr. and Mary Miller, both immigrants from the West Indies. Haughton received a BSS from the City College of New York in 1951 and an MPA from New York University in 1960. From 1951 to 1953 Haughton fought in the Korean War as a US Army lieutenant. Following his military service, Haughton worked with gang members in Los Angeles and New York City as a youth counselor and social worker.

Haughton married prominent anthropologist, social theorist, and feminist Elanor Leacock and remained with her until her death in 1987.

== Advocacy ==
In 1960, Haughton joined the newly formed Negro American Labor Council (NALC), serving as assistant to its president, A. Philip Randolph, until his 1962 departure. Following his involvement with NALC, Haughton served as chairman of the Labor and Industry Committee of the New York Branch of the NAACP.

Frustrated with perceived passivity within established civil rights organizations, Haughton, in 1964, established the Harlem Unemployment Center. The organization, renamed Fight Back in 1969, employed more aggressive tactics in advocating for minority hiring in the construction industry, equal employment opportunities, and minority (particularly Black and Puerto Rican) inclusion in unions.

Haughton was involved in a number of other causes including the anti-war movement, anti-nuclear movement, anti-Apartheid movement, tenants rights movement, and Puerto Rico solidarity movement.
