= Allan Rosenfield =

American physician

Allan Rosenfield (April 28, 1933 – October 12, 2008) was an advocate for women's health during the worldwide AIDS pandemic as dean of the Columbia Mailman School of Public Health.

== Early life ==
Rosenfield was born in Brookline, Massachusetts, on April 28, 1933. He received a B.A. in biochemistry from Harvard College in 1955. In 1959, he graduated from Columbia University College of Physicians and Surgeons with his M.D. degree.

== Career ==
After receiving his medical degree, he worked in Thailand with the Population Council in the 1960s, in a country with a severe lack of physicians and a 3.3% annual population growth rate, providing advice to the ministry of public health on reproductive, maternal and child health issues. In the six years he spent in Thailand, he started a family and learned the Thai language. At the time, IUDs and birth control pills were only available by prescription from a doctor. This meant that the most effective types of birth control were not available to 99% of the Thailand population. The national family planning program Rosenfield helped develop trained auxiliary midwives to prescribe birth control. Thailand's annual population growth rate dropped to 0.8% by the year 2000. His work with the Population Council also took him to other countries in Asia and Africa, where he first realized the difficulties of lowering birthrates in poor countries. He was a leader in promoting the view that necessary steps for controlling population growth and achieving economic development were the provision of reproductive health programs and the raising of the status of women.

Columbia University hired him in 1975 as a professor of public health and obstetrics and gynecology, and as director of the university's new Center for Population and Family Health. In this role, he focused the Center both on efforts in establishing community-based programs in the Upper Manhattan surrounding the school and in programs with a global reach. Until he was appointed dean of the Mailman School of Public Health in 1986, Rosenfield worked on a hands-on basis on the programs he had initiated, including the clinics for adolescent men and women, and clinics in local intermediate and high schools.

In 1985, Rosenfield and Deborah Maine had the article Maternal Mortality — A Neglected Tragedy: Where is the M in MCH? published in The Lancet, drawing attention to deaths of women in the third-world in pregnancy and childbirth. Efforts were made to improve access to health care for pregnant women in response to the article by international health groups. Rosenfield worked with the Bill & Melinda Gates Foundation to create more than 85 "safe motherhood" programs worldwide.

In 2000, at the International AIDS Conference in Durban, South Africa, Rosenfield followed up on his calls for improved access to maternal care, leading to the creation of the MTCT-Plus Initiative to help prevent mother-to-child transmission of AIDS. By the time of his death, the initiative had brought comprehensive health care to hundreds of thousands of women and infants throughout the world.

Rosenfield was national chairman of the Planned Parenthood Federation of America in 1985 and 1986. In 2006, he received the "Maggie" Award, highest honor of the Planned Parenthood Federation, in tribute to their founder, Margaret Sanger. He also served as chairman of the Program Board of the American Foundation for AIDS Research.

Rosenfield was an honorary member of the National Board of Public Health Examiners , an entity that provides the first and only core certification for public health professionals and graduates of CEPH-accredited institutions.

The main building of the Mailman School of Public Health on West 168th Street was named for Rosenfield in 2006, with Columbia's president, Lee C. Bollinger, noting that "over the last three decades at Columbia, Allan has not only inspired and trained generations of public health leaders, he has helped define what a school of public health should be."

== Personal life ==
Rosenfield was diagnosed with both amyotrophic lateral sclerosis (ALS) and myasthenia gravis in 2005, two separate diseases that affect motor nerve functions. After he received these diagnoses, tributes came from around the world, including a song dedication by Bono at a U2 concert.

Rosenfield died of ALS at age 75 on October 12, 2008 at his home in Hartsdale, New York. He was survived by his daughter, his son, and his wife, Clare.
