= Ola Akinboboye =

Nigerian-American nuclear cardiologist

- Born: Olakunle Akinboboye; Maiduguri, Nigeria
- Education: Columbia Business School (MBA); Columbia University School of Public Health (MPH); University of Ibadan (MBBS)
- Scientific career
- Fields: Cardiology
- Workplaces: Cornell University; Laurelton Heart Specialist; New York Hospital

Ola (Olakunle) Akinboboye is a Nigerian-American nuclear cardiologist.

== Early life and education ==
Born in Nigeria, Olakunle earned a medical degree from University of Ibadan College of Medicine (1984). He moved to the United States where he earned an MBA and master's degree in public health from Columbia University.

== Medical and academic career ==
Olakunle completed his internal medicine residency at the Nassau University Medical Center, and a cardiology fellowship at the State University of New York. He went on to Columbia University Vagelos College of Physicians and Surgeons and completed another fellowship with dedicated training in nuclear cardiology and an advanced echocardiolography. He became an associate professor of clinical medicine at the Weill Medical College of Cornell University, New York. He is the medical director of Laurelton Heart Specialists P.C. and Strong Health Medical Group P.C., Rosedale, Queens. He specializes in cardiac imaging, clinical hypertension, coronary artery disease and diabetes. He has been listed among the top doctors in New York by prominent American medical publications.

=== Professional medical associations ===
He served on the International Board of Governors of the American College of Cardiology from 1997 to 2000. He became the 14th national president of the Association of Black Cardiologists (ABC) which was established in 1974 to focus on the adverse impact of cardiovascular disease on African Americans. He is a Fellow of the American College of Physicians. Other memberships include:

- American College of Cardiology
- American Heart Association
- International Society of Hypertension in Blacks
- American Society of Nuclear Cardiology
- Society for Cardiovascular Magnetic Resonance
- Certification Board of Nuclear Cardiology
