= Eliseo Guallar =

American epidemiologist

Academic background
- Education: MD, 1987, University of Zaragoza; MPH, 1989, University of Minnesota; DrPH, 1994, Harvard University
- Thesis: A prospective study of plasma levels of fatty acids and incidence of myocardial infarction in US physicians (1994)

Eliseo Guallar (1963-2026) was an American epidemiologist who was professor of epidemiology at the Johns Hopkins Bloomberg School of Public Health with a joint appointment at the Johns Hopkins University School of Medicine before becoming Chair of the Department of Epidemiology at New York University’s School of Global Public Health in 2024. His research focused on cardiovascular diseases.

== Early life and education ==
Guallar completed his medical degree at the University of Zaragoza in 1987 before travelling to North America for his Master's degree in the University of Minnesota with a Fulbright Scholarship. Following this, he enrolled at Harvard University for his DrPH in 1994.

== Career ==
Upon completing his formal education, Guallar joined the faculty of Johns Hopkins Bloomberg School of Public Health as an assistant professor in epidemiology. In this role, he co-authored Mercury, Fish Oils and the Risk of Myocardial Infarction which advised eliminating fish with high mercury content from the human diet. Later that year, Guallar also published a study of 7,830 white and African American adults age 30 to 74 to prove that rising systolic blood pressure was the clearest indicator for increased risk of death compared to other blood pressure measurements. As a result of his research, Guallar was named a Fellow of the Center for Excellence in Environmental Public Health Tracking at the Johns Hopkins Bloomberg School of Public Health. During the 2012–13 academic year, Guallar was elected a Fellow of the American Heart Association and promoted to the rank of professor in the Department of Epidemiology.

In 2005 Guallar published a meta-analysis suggesting that high-dose vitamin E supplementation might increase all-cause mortality, ending then-growing enthusiasm for the supplement among the cardiologist community.

He was founding director of the Center for Clinical Epidemiology at the Samsung Medical Center in South Korea and a Deputy Editor of Methods at the journal Annals of Internal Medicine.

In 2016, Guallar was recognized as a scientist who is among the top one percent in their fields for citations. During the COVID-19 pandemic, Guallar co-authored The Role of Masks in Mitigating the SARS-CoV-2 Pandemic: Another Piece of the Puzzle.
