= Mary Ann McLaughlin =

American cardiologist

- Born: 1968 (age 57–58)
- Education: University of Virginia (BA); Georgetown University School of Medicine (MD); Columbia University (MPH)
- Scientific career
- Fields: Cardiologist
- Workplaces: Mount Sinai Medical Center

Mary Ann McLaughlin (born 1968) is an American cardiologist, the author of multiple book chapters and an associate professor at Mount Sinai Medical Center in New York City.

Her research – funded with grants from the Agency for Healthcare Research and Quality, the National Institutes of Health, the American Heart Association, the American College of Cardiology and the New York Academy of Medicine – focuses on the improvement of cardiovascular care for women, the elderly and minorities.

== Biography ==
McLaughlin received her B.A. in Biology from the University of Virginia in 1984 and graduated from Georgetown University School of Medicine in 1990 as member of the Alpha Omega Alpha medical honor society. She completed both an internship and residency at NewYork-Presbyterian Hospital in 1993 and received her Master's in Public Health from Columbia University School of Public Health in 1996.

She is co-founder of the Women's Cardiac Assessment and Risk Evaluation Program at the Mount Sinai Medical Center, serves on the editorial board of Focus on Healthy Aging and, as of July 2008, is a member of the American Heart Association's Boards of Directors (East Coast region).

== Awards and honors ==
- American College of Cardiology/Merck Fellowship Award
- C. Richard Bowman Award (awarded to the New York Hospital house officer demonstrating human warmth, scientific endeavor, and dedication to medicine)
- Mary and David Hoar Fellowship of the New York Academy of Medicine
- SmithKline Beecham Development Partners Junior Faculty Award in Cardiology
- Arthur Ross Foundation Award
- B. Chaus Scholar Cardiology Award, Mount Sinai Medical Center

== Memberships ==
- President, American Heart Association, NYC Board
- American Heart Association, Board of Directors, Northeast Region July 2008 – present
- American Heart Association, Member 1997–present
- American Heart Association, Invited National Spokesperson 2004-2005
- Mount Sinai Cardiovascular Institute Compliance Committee January 2007 – present
- Mount Sinai School of Medicine Alumni Association Executive Committee, January 2007 – present
- National Institutes of Health, National Center on Minority Health and Health Disparities, Grant Review Committee, June 2005
- Women with Heart, Executive Committee 2004–present
- American College of Cardiology, Fellow, inducted 1999
- Editorial Board, Focus on Healthy Aging, A Belvoir Publications, Mahopac, NY. 2002–present
- Mount Sinai School of Medicine Re-Engineering Electronic Medical Records Committee, 1998-1999
- Mount Sinai School of Medicine Quality Assurance Subcommittee 1999
- Mount Sinai School of Medicine Cardiothoracic Chair Search Committee, 1999-2000

== Publications ==
Partial list:

- Mennell, JS; Cesarman, GM; Jacovina, AT; Mclaughlin, M; Lev, EA; Hajjar, KA (1991). "Annexin II and bleeding in acute promyelocytic leukemia". N Engl J Med. 340: 994–1004.
- Mclaughlin, M; Fuster, V. (1995). "Three mechanisms for coronary artery disease progression; insights into future management". Mount Sinai Journal of Medicine. 62 (4): 265–274.
- Mclaughlin, M; Phillips, RA; Patel, TN; Siu, AL; David, O; Buckley, S; Mara, T; Goldman, ME (1997). "Prevalence and treatment patterns of diastolic filling abnormalities in the elderly". Journal of Heart Failure. 4 (1): 110.
- Gersony, DR; Mclaughlin, M; Sacks, HS; Fuster, V; Gersony, WM (1999). "Effect of beta blocker therapy on clinical outcome in patients with Marfans syndrome: Meta-analysis of data from 802 patients". JACC. 33 (2): 243.
- Lala, A; McLaughlin, MA (August 2008). "Do ACE inhibitors all provide the same outcomes benefits in high-risk cardiovascular patients?". Curr. Hypertens. Rep. 10: 286–92. PMID 18625157.
- Choi, BG; McLaughlin, MA (June 2007). "Why men's hearts break: cardiovascular effects of sex steroids". Endocrinol. Metab. Clin. North Am. 36: 365–77. doi:10.1016/j.ecl.2007.03.011. PMID 17543724.
- Khan, RA; Moskowitz, DM; Marin, ML; Hollier, LH; Parsons, R; Teodorescu, V; McLaughlin, MA (2000). "Safety and Efficacy of High Dose Adenosine–induced A Systole During Endovascular AAA Repair". J Endovasc Ther. 7: 292–296.
- Hebert, PL; Sisk, JE; Wang, J; Horowitz, CR; Chassin, MR; McLaughlin, MA. "Cost-effectiveness of nurse-led disease management for heart failure in a racially diverse urban community". Annals of Internal Medicine.
