= Jessica Y. Lee =

American dentist

- Awards: Presidential Early Career Award for Scientists and Engineers

Academic background
- Education: BA, Anthropology/Biology, 1992, Western Washington University; DDS, 1997, Columbia University College of Dental Medicine; MPH, Columbia University Mailman School of Public Health; PhD, Health Policy and Management, 2002, University of North Carolina at Chapel Hill

Jessica Y. Lee is an American dentist. She is the Demeritt Distinguished Professor and chair of the Department of Pediatric Dentistry in the Adams School of Dentistry at the UNC School of Dentistry. In 2019, Lee was elected president of the American Academy of Pediatric Dentistry. She also explores treatments for pediatric patients who have lost teeth through trauma and for patients with permanent teeth.

== Early life and education ==
Lee earned her Bachelor of Arts degree in Anthropology and Biology from Western Washington University. From there, she simultaneously earned her Master of Public Health and completed Dental School at Columbia University College of Dental Medicine before transferring to the University of North Carolina at Chapel Hill for her PhD.

== Career ==
After completing her pediatric dentistry residency program and Ph.D. in health policy, Lee joined the faculty at the UNC School of Dentistry. As an associate professor, Lee became the principal investigator for a project addressing how the oral health literacy of caregivers and parents affects the oral health outcomes of their preschool-aged children. In recognition of her efforts, she was awarded the 2008 Jerome B. Miller “For the Kids” Award from the American Academy of Pediatric Dentistry. In 2010, Lee was the recipient of a Presidential Early Career Award for Scientists and Engineers for her research into "health literacy, outcome assessment, cost-effectiveness investigations, access to oral health care, and health disparities in young children." She was also awarded the 2011 Pediatric Dentist of the Year Award from the American Academy of Pediatric Dentistry and named the second William W. Demeritt Distinguished Professor.

As a member of the American Association of Dental Research, Lee was elected to sit on their Publications Committee in 2012, where she would review the quality and financial status of the Journal of Dental Research and other journals. In 2014, Lee was appointed chair of the Department of Pediatric Dentistry in the Adams School of Dentistry and elected to become an associate editor of the Journal of Dental Research.

Alongside a research team consisting of orthodontists, pediatric dentists, and an oral surgeon, Lee began implementing a procedure of autotransplantation where wisdom teeth were moved to another spot in their mouth. She was also named the vice president of the American Academy of Pediatric Dentistry. In June 2019, Lee was elected president of the American Academy of Pediatric Dentistry.
