= ICAP at Columbia University =

International center for AIDS care and treatment programs since 2003

ICAP at Columbia University's Mailman School of Public Health (formerly the International Center for AIDS Care and Treatment Programs) supports programs and research that address HIV/AIDS and related conditions and works to strengthen health systems. ICAP supports HIV/AIDS prevention, care and treatment programs in 19 African countries including: Angola, Cameroon, Côte d'Ivoire, Democratic Republic of Congo, Ethiopia, Kenya, Lesotho, Malawi, Mali, Mozambique, Namibia, Sierra Leone, South Africa, South Sudan, Swaziland, Tanzania, Uganda, Zambia, and Zimbabwe. It also works in Central Asia, Ukraine, Georgia, Myanmar, Brazil, Guatemala, China, Jordan, Lebanon, and Turkey. ICAP supports several hundred project sites, which provide HIV prevention, care and treatment to hundreds of thousands of individuals.

Launched in 2003, ICAP is led by its Founder and Global Director Wafaa El-Sadr. With a special emphasis on family-focused care, use of multidisciplinary teams, attention to the multitude of needs of individuals at risk for or living with HIV/AIDS, ICAP programs include HIV counseling and testing, prevention of mother-to-child HIV transmission, comprehensive HIV care, antiretroviral therapy, and management for related conditions, such as tuberculosis.

ICAP's goal is to build capacity for the implementation of diverse programs and to support the strengthening of other aspects of health systems, such as the renovation of health facilities, the training and mentoring of health care providers, and building the capacity of program managers and administrators. Such programs include Clinical Mentorship Systems Training and the ICAP's Global Nurse Capacity Building Program. In addition, ICAP supports a Next Generation Program for undergraduate and graduate student from all disciplines.

ICAP partners with both public and private organizations, including ministries of health, the World Health Organization, and UNAIDS. Partnerships with non-governmental and community-based organizations, as well as faith-based groups, address care for at-risk populations, including children, and create income-generating projects for people living in affected communities.

ICAP is the largest implementing partner for PEPFAR, the President's Emergency Plan for AIDS Relief.
