= Denise Drace-Brownell =

American businessperson and author

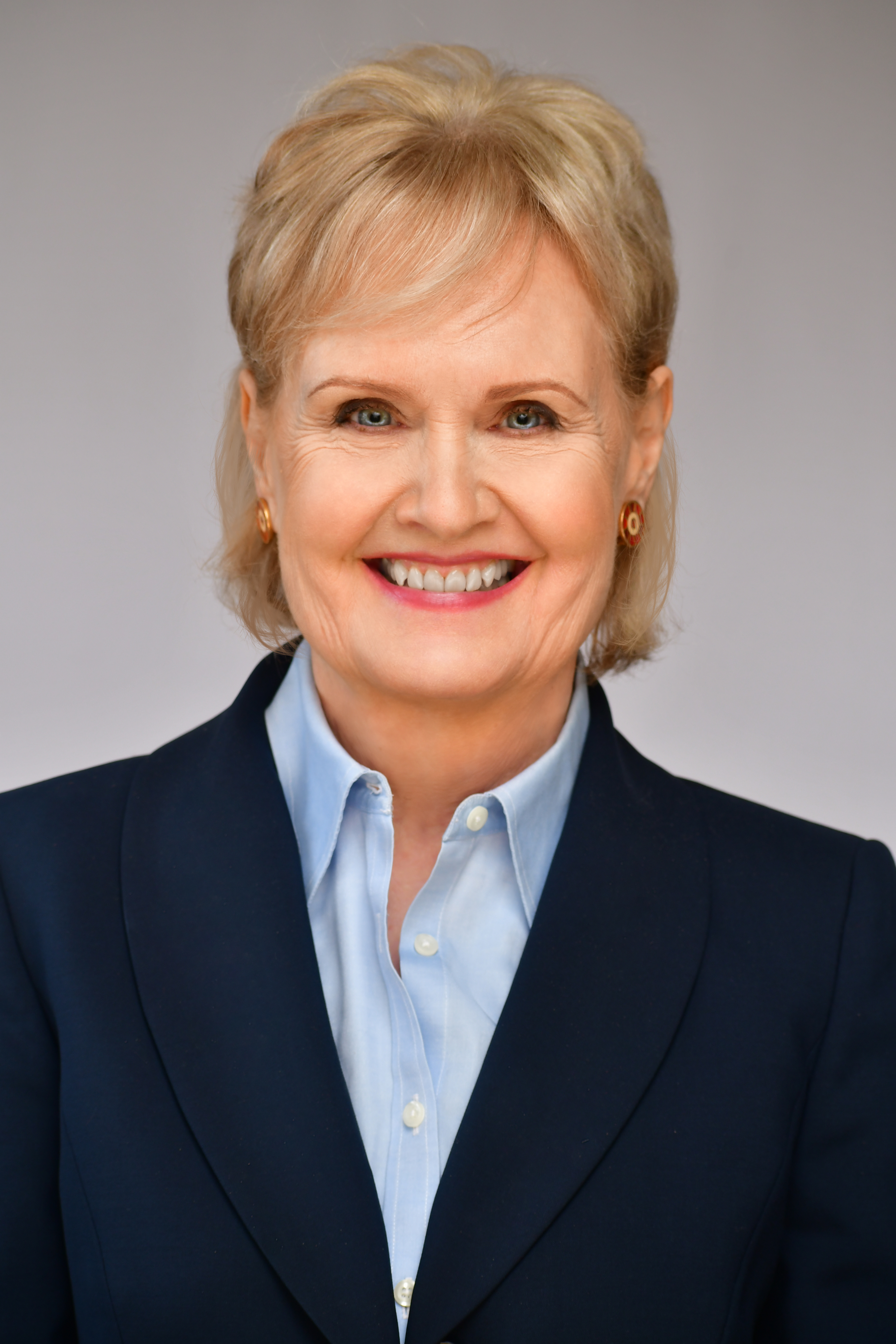
- Education: University of Illinois (B.S.); Rutgers University (J.D.); Columbia University (M.P.H.
- Occupations: businessperson, technologist, corporate attorney, and author
- Known for: Work in vision technology and climate change

Denise Drace-Brownell is an American businessperson, technologist, corporate attorney, author, and founder of DDB Technology. She has written two books and papers on topics of binocular vision disorder and climate change.

== Education ==
In 1977, Drace-Brownell graduated with a B.S. degree from the University of Illinois, followed by a J.D. from Rutgers University with study at the University of Pennsylvania. In 1993, she received an MPH from Columbia University.

== Career ==
Drace-Brownell began her career as a researcher looking into the combination of computer and telephone communication systems. In 1980, she was first quoted in the Rockford Register Star as stating that the research at the time "barely scratched the surface of the issues ahead," as she looked into the future potential of a company like AT&T of providing both telecommunications and data carrying services (something that later came true during the early 1990s).

In 1981 she became an associate legislative counsel for energy and environment at the New Jersey Office of Administrative Law. She also was the executive director of the Northeast Interstate Low-Level Radioactive Waste Compact Commission during the 1980s, a northeastern governmental compact formed between the states of New Jersey and Connecticut. Later, Drace-Brownell founded FutureBrand Healthcare, a healthcare brand program for Interpublic Group (IPG). In addition, she is the advisory board member of GenRx Pharmacy Group and has worked in the M&A unit of Akzo Nobel. In 2000, Drace-Brownell founded DDB Technology. As of January 2024, she is the CEO of the firm

In her guide Binocular Vision Disorder: A Patient's Guide to a Life-Limiting, Often Underdiagnosed, Medical Condition, she discusses her early life disability and gives an in-depth look at binocular vision disorder. In addition, she has provided a pathway for those with symptomatic binocular disorders.

== Publications ==
=== The First Nazi: Erich Ludendorff, the Man Who Made Hitler Possible ===
She is the co-author of The First Nazi: Erich Ludendorff, the Man Who Made Hitler Possible, written with co-author Will Brownell. The book follows the historical life of Erich Ludendorff, and focuses on his dictator-style leadership in Germany during and after the First World War. Their focus on Ludendorff’s anti-Semitism describes how his career prepared the Germans psychologically for Nazi rule, and on decisions such as allowing Vladimir Lenin to return to Russia from exile in Switzerland. Kirkus Reviews said of the book that, "Despite a dearth of material, the authors deliver a chilling, well-researched biography that opens a whole new window on the world wars and the German psyche at the time." The book has been translated into Romanian, Italian, Chinese and Czech.

=== Research papers and articles ===
- Donna Ison, Denise Drace-Brownell, JD, MPH, Jeffrey Cooper, MS, OD, FAAO (2021, Dec 22). Innovations in Binocular Vision Disorder Testing and Treatments: Interview with Denise Drace-Brownell, JD, MPH, and Jeffrey Cooper, MS, OD, FAAO. Eyes On Eyecare.
- Drace-Brownell, JD, MPH, Denise, Climate Change and Carbon Dioxide Imperatives (April 21, 1992). http://dx.doi.org/10.2139/ssrn.3549123

== Personal life ==
Drace-Brownell’s struggle with, and treatment of, binocular vision disorder was the subject of an article by Lambeth Hochwald, which appeared in Reader's Digest. Her disorder was resolved in 2009 prescription of prism glasses by a New York City optometrist. She then developed a form of eyeglasses that can help with the disorder. In addition, she has made several contributions to the field of binocular vision disorder.
