= Shekinah Elmore =

American oncologist (died 2024)

Shekinah Elmore (c. 1982 – July 24, 2024) was an assistant professor in the department of radiation oncology at the University of North Carolina School of Medicine. As both a cancer doctor and a self-described "cancer person", she was known for her work in cancer patient advocacy among her fellow physicians and for her public speaking and writing. She wrote and spoke publicly about surviving childhood rhabdomyosarcoma in the New England Journal of Medicine.

While training at Harvard Medical School she focused on understanding and improving radiotherapy access in resource-limited settings and promoting pathways for resident involvement in improving global radiotherapy. Elmore received a Fulbright award to travel to Rwanda and study how patients there experience cancer treatment, which she spoke about at TEDMED.

Elmore died in 2024.

== Education ==
She received her BA from Brown University, her MPH from Columbia University, and her MD from Harvard Medical School.
