= Aletha Maybank =

American physician

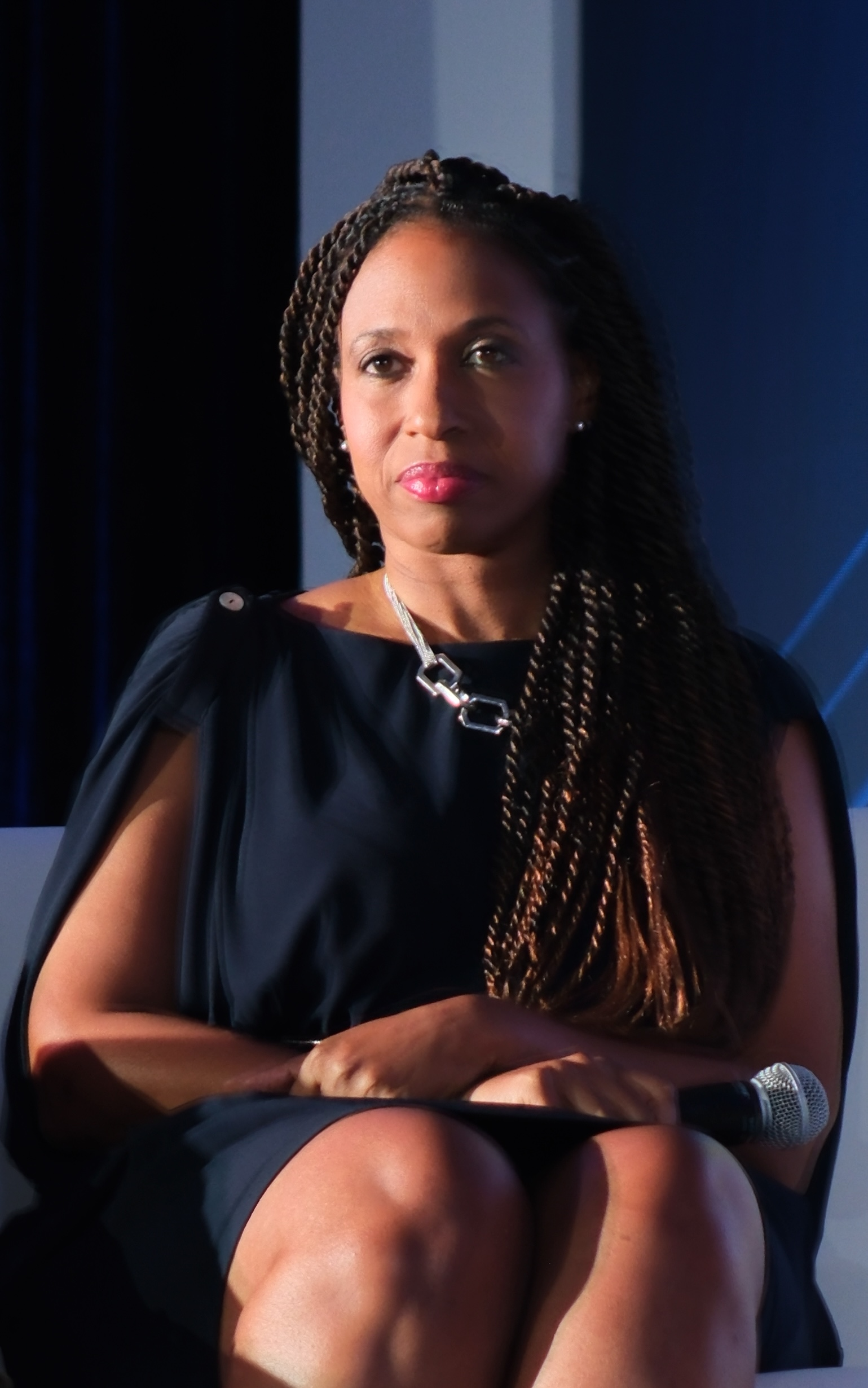
- Aletha Maybank at the Global Black Economic Forum Business Summit 2025
- Born: Harrisburg, Pennsylvania
- Education: Johns Hopkins University (BA), Temple University School of Medicine (MD), Columbia University Mailman School of Public Health (MPH).

Karen Aletha Maybank is an American physician. She is board certified in both pediatrics and preventive medicine/public health. Maybank was the chief health equity officer of the American Medical Association for five years, until stepping down at the end of 2024.

== Early life and education ==
Maybank was born in Harrisburg, Pennsylvania. She holds a Bachelor of Arts from Johns Hopkins University, a Medical Degree from Temple University School of Medicine, and a Master of Public Health from Columbia University Mailman School of Public Health.

== Career ==
Maybank is a pediatrician and preventive medicine physician. She is a founding board member of the Artemis Medical Society, an organization of over 2,500 Black female physicians, established in 2012.

Maybank co-founded "We Are Doc McStuffins," with two other founding members of Artemis Medical Society, Myiesha Taylor, Naeemah Ghafur, who were inspired by the Disney Junior character Doc Mcstuffins. In the initiative she shared insights into her work and what it's like to be a physician.

Maybank participated in medical mission trips to Haïti following the devastating earthquake in 2010, providing direct care to child survivors; she created the blog "On Call in the City" in an effort to make health an accessible topic "wherever one lives, works, plays, and prays”. She has a bi-weekly column, Doctor's Orders, on the website of EBONY magazine. The column was established for Maybank to share her health expertise with the African American community-at-large. She is also a contributor for Huffington Post. Her expertise centers on health equity, preventive medicine, food and fitness, maternal and child health, cancer, HIV/AIDS, and community health.

Maybank created the blog, "On Call in the City", in an effort to make health an accessible topic "wherever one lives, works, plays, and prays”. She has a bi-weekly column, Doctor's Orders, on the website of EBONY magazine. The column was established for Maybank to share her health expertise with the African American community-at-large. She is also a contributor for Huffington Post.

Maybank was a guest speaker at Kechie's Project and Bread & Roses High School Fashion Showcase in Harlem, NY on June 18, 2013. She spoke on a panel at the ESSENCE Festival Empowerment Experience Panels titled I Beat: Healthy, Journeys & Transformations on July 5, 2013.

Maybank was appointed the associate commissioner of the Center for Health Equity with New York City Department of Health and Mental Hygiene in 2014. She is the founding director of the department's Center of Health Equity.

In April 2019, she joined the American Medical Association (AMA) as their inaugural chief health equity officer and vice president. In that role she co-authored and edited the AMA's guidance document Advancing Health Equity: A Guide to Language, Narrative, and Concepts, which asked "questions about language and commonly used phrases and terms, with the goal of cultivating awareness about dominant narratives and offering equity-based, equity-explicit, and person-first alternatives."

In July 2025, Maybank spoke on at the Global Black Economic Forum Business Summit Panel titled: "GBEF Recap & Plans for 2025" on July 3, 2025.

== Awards ==
- 2011 Outstanding NYC Leader Award, Kechie's Project
- 2011 NV Magazine's Movers & Shakers
- 2012 The Network Journal 40 Under Forty Award
- 2012 Beauty and the Beat: Heroine in Excellence Award
- 2023, Allan Rosenfield Alumni Award for Excellence, Columbia Mailman Alumni Board's Governance Committee
- 2023, Fierce Healthcare's most influential minority executives in healthcare, Fierce Healthcare
- 2023, Bronze Winner, The Telly Awards
- 2023, Top 100 Global Recognition MIPAD, MIPAD100
- 2023, Hispanic Health Leadership Award, National Hispanic Health Foundation
- 2024, 10 Executives to Watch in 2024, Modern Health Care
- 2024, STATUS List 2024 - The Ultimate List of Leaders in Life Sciences

== Film ==
Year	Title	Role
2009	The Deadliest Disease in America	Advisor
2012	Soul Food Junkies	Advisor
2013	The Tale of Timmy Two Chins	Advisor
