= Mother Cabrini Health Foundation =

American health charity in New York State

- Named after: Mother Cabrini
- Established: 2018; 8 years ago
- Type: Private Nonprofit
- Legal status: Foundation
- Purpose: Providing grants to improve health and quality of life for low-income and underserved communities in New York
- Location: New York, United States
- Region served: New York
- Key people: Rev. Msgr. Gregory Mustaciuolo, CEO; Alfred F. Kelly, Chair
- Website: cabrinihealth.org

Mother Cabrini Health Foundation is a private American charitable foundation that provides funding for healthcare and health-related initiatives in the U.S. state of New York, aimed at low-income and underserved communities. It is the largest health foundation focused only on New York.

== History ==
The foundation was created in 2018 following the sale of Fidelis Care, a private nonprofit health plan that was incorporated by New York State's Catholic bishops in 1993. The board of Fidelis sold the plan to Centene for $3.75 billion. As part of the purchase agreement, the Mother Cabrini Health Foundation was created and funded with $3.2 billion from the sale.

The foundation awarded its first round of grants for year-end 2019 to benefit programs in 2020, totaling approximately $150 million. It provided grants to around 500 organizations and initiatives, including Gates Vascular Institute and the John R. Oishei Children's Hospital. In 2020, the foundation committed an additional $50 million of funding, specifically to support COVID-19 related programs that would help New Yorkers affected by the virus. For its year-end 2020 grants, the foundation provided $115 million to 400 recipients including the Brooklyn Hospital Center, Montefiore Medical Center, NYC Health + Hospitals, Canisius College, and Hilbert College. The organization awarded a total of $165 million in grants for 2020. In May 2021, it announced an additional $20 million in funding for COVID-19 related programs. As of February 2022, the foundation had awarded a total of $470 million in grants since it was established. Its year end 2021 grants provided $140 million for approximately 450 recipients. The foundation was the largest private donor for 45% of the programs it funded in the 2021 grants, and around 50% of the grants were $250,000 or more.

In 2022, the Foundation provided $2 million in funding for FoodMap NY, a project focused on long-term solutions for food insecurity, including support for farmers in New York state. The organization also supported a study by New York healthcare associations into workforce issues in mid-2022, to help identify ways to address healthcare workforce issues. In January 2023, the Foundation announced that it had committed $165 million in grants to approximately 538 programs and organizations in New York, focused on areas including mental health services, dental care, healthcare worker training and recruitment, and long-term care for the elderly and disabled individuals. In total, the foundation had provided $635 million in grants between 2019 and 2023.

The Foundation awarded a total of $172 million to 514 grantees in its year-end 2023 grant giving. Approximately half of the grants continued support for grantees from previous years. From 2019 to 2024, the foundation had awarded 2,700 grants for a total of approximately $800 million. The grants focused on programs aiming to improve health equity, including programs for asylum seekers and other immigrants, individuals dealing with addiction or mental health needs, and children.

By early 2025, Mother Cabrini Health Foundation had given out over $1 billion in grants, including $203 million in year end grants it awarded for 2024. The Foundation awarded 539 grants to organizations in its 2024 year end grants.

In May 2025, the foundation launched a nursing-focused grants program awarding $51 million in grants to 13 hospital systems in New York state. The "Nursing Initiative" grants are intended to support existing and new programs provided by hospitals to pursue nursing credentials and provide mentoring and career development for new nurses.

== Organization ==
The foundation is headquartered in New York City. It was named for Mother Frances Xavier Cabrini, a Roman Catholic nun who founded the Missionary Sisters of the Sacred Heart of Jesus and was the first naturalized American citizen to be canonized a saint. She worked to help poor immigrants and children in New York.

The foundation is among the 25 wealthiest charitable foundations in the United States, based on its assets, and the largest to focus on New York State. Grants from the foundation are provided to initiatives and organizations that support underserved and low-income communities in New York State and aim to improve healthcare and quality of life, specifically social determinants of health.

The former vicar general and chancellor of the Archdiocese of New York, Rev. Msgr. Gregory Mustaciuolo, is the organization's CEO.

Former member of the New York State Assembly Marcos Crespo was appointed to the organization's board of directors in June 2022.
