= James G. Haughton =

American physician

James G. Haughton was a veteran public health administrator, serving in numerous capacities across the country, most recently as medical director for the Los Angeles County Department of Health Services from which he retired in 2004 at age 78.

Haughton began his life in the United States as an immigrant student from Panama at Pacific Union College in the Napa Valley from which he graduated in 1948. He attended medical school at The Loma Linda University School of Medicine, where he was the only black student in his class, graduating in 1950. He later earned a masters in public health from Columbia University's School of Public Health.

Completing medical school, Haughton had difficulty finding internships due to widespread discrimination against blacks. "I began to realize that the color of my skin, which had never been a problem for me in Panama ... was a problem for me," he is quoted saying in the Los Angeles Times. In 1951, he was accepted as an intern at Unity Hospital in Brooklyn, New York. The Times reports that "he saw that poor people, who were often black, were more frequently used as 'teaching material' for interns and residents" while he trained at Unity as an obstetrician and gynecologist.

After medical school, Haughton initially entered private practice in obstetrics and later became a medical administrative officer for the United States Navy. His career in public health began in New York City in 1965. In 1967, President Richard Nixon appointed Haughton to Department of Health, Education and Welfare task force overseeing Medicaid. Following his time at New York, Haughton became executive director of the Health and Hospital Governing Commission in Chicago, Illinois in 1971. In this position, he was the highest-paid public official in Illinois with compensation of $60,000 a year.

In 1980, Haughton moved to Los Angeles to run operations at the Charles R. Drew Postgraduate Medical School. He left Los Angeles in 1983 to head the health department in Houston, Texas but returned to Los Angeles in 1987 to become chief of staff for the King/Drew Medical Center.

He became health policy advisor to the Los Angeles County Health Department in 1993 and its medical director in 1996, holding that position until his retirement in 2004.
