= Douglas Wiebe =

American epidemiologist

Douglas James Wiebe
- Education: University of California, Irvine
- Awards: Independent Scientist Award from the National Institute on Alcohol Abuse and Alcoholism
- Scientific career
- Fields: Public health, epidemiology, biostatistics
- Workplaces: University of Pennsylvania, University of Michigan
- Thesis: Lifestyle risk factors for homicide (2000)

Douglas James Wiebe is a professor of epidemiology at the University of Michigan School of Public Health.

== Education ==
Wiebe received his B.A. in psychology from the University of Calgary in 1991, his M.A. in criminology from Indiana State University in 1996, and his Ph.D. in Social Ecology from the University of California, Irvine in 2000. He then completed postdoctoral studies in injury epidemiology at the UCLA School of Public Health.

== Career ==
From 2009 to 2014 he held an appointment of Visiting Scholar in the Department of Geography at the University of Cambridge, England. Before moving to the University of Michigan, he was associate professor of epidemiology at the Center for Clinical Epidemiology and Biostatistics in the Perelman School of Medicine at the University of Pennsylvania.

== Research ==
Wiebe's research covers topics such as risk factors for injury, alcohol use, and the effect of daily routines on health behaviors. In 2003, he published a study that concluded that having a gun in the home increased the risk of homicide and suicide. The same study concluded that 41% of gun homicides and 94% of gun suicides would not happen without access to guns. In 2009, he co-authored a study that found that gun owners were more likely to be shot in an assault than were non-gun owners, which has been credited with persuading the United States Congress to extend the 1996 Dickey Amendment to include the National Institutes of Health (which funded the study) two years later. In 2015, he co-authored another study that found that someone's location and how they got there both affected their risk of violent victimization.

== Honors, awards and positions ==
Wiebe is a member of the American College of Epidemiology and of the Board of Directors of SAVIR (Society for the Advancement of Violence and Injury Research), serves as a reviewer for journals including the American Journal of Public Health, American Journal of Epidemiology, British Medical Journal, and Pediatrics, is on the editorial board of the Journal of Trauma, and serves on study sections for the Center for Scientific Review at the NIH, the National Science Foundation, and the Social Science and Humanities Research Council of Canada. He received the Teaching Award in the Masters of Science in Clinical Epidemiology Program in 2008/09, and in 2012 he received the Dean's Award for Excellence in Basic Science Teaching.
