= Tania Patriota =

Colombian diplomat

Tania Patriota was the Deputy Head of the United Nations Mission in Colombia and the United Nations Deputy Special Representative for Colombia.

She was succeeded by Jessica Faieta on March 2, 2018.

== Biographical Information ==
Ms. Patriota has worked for more than 20 years with the United Nations and brings extensive experience to this position. She has worked with the United Nations Population Fund (UNFPA) in Brazil, Colombia, Haiti and Mongolia and has had postings at the Headquarters of the United Nations in New York. Her expertise touches on gender-based violence prevention and response, population and development and international public health. Ms. Patriota is a graduate of Columbia University with a Master of Public Health and holds degrees in numerical calculus and cognitive and experimental psychology from the University of Geneva.
