= Andreu Mas-Colell =

Catalan economist and politician from Spain

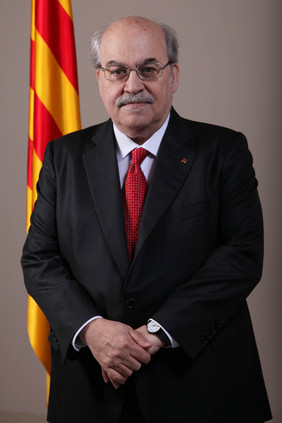

Minister of Economy and Knowledge of Catalonia
- In office 29 December 2010 – 14 January 2016
- Prime Minister: Artur Mas
- Preceded by: Antoni Castells (Economy); Josep Huguet (Innovation and Universities)
- Succeeded by: Oriol Junqueras

Minister of Universities, Research and the Information Society of Catalonia
- In office 3 April 2000 – 17 December 2003
- President: Jordi Pujol
- Succeeded by: Carles Solà

Personal details
- Born: Andreu Mas-Colell; 29 June 1944 (age 82) Barcelona, Catalonia, Spain
- Citizenship: Spanish
- Party: CDC (2012–2016)
- Children: Alexandre Mas
- Profession: Economist Professor

Academic background
- Education: University of Barcelona; University of Minnesota-Minneapolis
- Doctoral advisor: Marcel Kessel Richter

Academic work
- Discipline: Microeconomics
- Institutions: University of California, Berkeley; Harvard University; Pompeu Fabra University
- Doctoral students: Timothy Kehoe; Eddie Dekel; Mathias Dewatripont; Atsushi Kajii; Roberto Serrano; Antoni Calvó-Armengol
- Website: Information at IDEAS / RePEc

Andreu Mas-Colell (Catalan: [ənˈdɾew ˈmas kuˈleʎ]; born 29 June 1944) is an economist, an expert in microeconomics and a prominent mathematical economist. He is the founder of the Barcelona School of Economics and a professor in the department of economics at Pompeu Fabra University in Barcelona, Catalonia. He has also served several times in the cabinet of the Catalan government. Summarizing his and others' research in general equilibrium theory, his monograph gave a thorough exposition of research using differential topology. His textbook Microeconomic Theory, co-authored with Michael Whinston and Jerry Green, is the most used graduate microeconomics textbook in the world.

In June 2021, Spain’s Court of Auditors found that he was among those responsible for government expenditure on the unconstitutional 2017 Catalan independence referendum, and announced its intention to fine him millions of euros; one member of the court dissented, and an outcry from economists followed.

== Biography ==
A native of Barcelona, Mas-Colell completed his undergraduate studies at the University of Barcelona, earning a degree in economics in 1966. He moved to the University of Minnesota for his graduate studies, and completed his Ph.D. in 1972 under the supervision of Marcel Richter. He took a faculty position in mathematics and economics at the University of California, Berkeley, becoming a full professor in 1979. In 1981, he moved to Harvard University, and in 1988 he became the Louis Berkman Professor of Economics at Harvard. In 1995 he moved to Pompeu Fabra to lead the Department of Economics and Business. He was editor-in-chief of the Journal of Mathematical Economics from 1985 to 1989, and of Econometrica from 1988 to 1998. He was president of the Econometric Society in 1993 and of the European Economic Association in 2006.

In public service, Mas-Colell was the Commissioner for Universities and Research of the Generalitat of Catalonia in 1999–2000. While Minister of Universities, Research and the Information Society for the Generalitat from 2000 to 2003, Mas-Colell implemented a research institution called Catalan Institution for Research and Advanced Studies (ICREA) to attract top-notch scientists in all fields of knowledge, from philosophers to astrophysicists, to perform their research in 50 different host institutions in Catalonia. Mas-Colell served the Secretary General of the European Research Council from 2009 to 2010. In the Catalonia Government from 2010-2016, presided by Artur Mas, he was appointed as the Councillor for Economy and Knowledge, being responsible for the government's budget, economic policy, and research policy.

Spain’s Court of Auditors in June 2021 held Mas-Colell and several former colleagues in the Catalan government responsible for the mismanagement of €4.8m in support of Catalan independence. Paul Romer, a Nobel prizewinner in economics, said that the procedure appeared to be ‘not justice but politics by other means.’ One member of the tribunal voted against the decision.

== Research ==
Mas-Colell's research has ranged broadly over mathematical economics. In particular, he has been associated with a revival of the use of differential calculus (in the form of "global analysis") at the highest levels of mathematical economics. Following John von Neumann's break-throughs in economics, and particularly after his introduction of functional analysis and topology into economic theory, advanced mathematical economics reduced its emphasis on differential calculus. In general equilibrium theory, mathematical economists used general topology, convex geometry, and optimization theory more than differential calculus. In the 1960s and 1970s, however, Gérard Debreu and Stephen Smale led a revival of the use of differential calculus in mathematical economics. In particular, they were able to prove the existence of a general equilibrium, where earlier writers had failed, through the use of their novel mathematics: Baire category from general topology and Sard's lemma from differential topology and differential geometry. Their publications initiated a period of research "characterized by the use of elementary differential topology": "almost every area in economic theory where the differential approach has been pursued, including general equilibrium" was covered by Mas-Colell's monograph on differentiable analysis and economics. Mas-Colell's book "offers a synthetic and thorough account of a major recent development in general equilibrium analysis, namely, the largely successful reconstruction of the theory using modern ideas of differential topology", according to its back cover.

Mas-Colell has also contributed to the theory of general equilibrium in topological vector lattices. The sets of prices and quantities can be described as partially ordered vector spaces, often as vector lattices. Economies with uncertain or dynamic decisions typically require that the vector spaces be infinite-dimensional, in which case the order properties of vector lattices allow stronger conclusions to be made. Recently researchers have studied nonlinear pricing: A "main motivation came from the fact that Mas-Colell's fundamental theory of welfare economics with no interiority assumptions crucially requires lattice properties of commodity spaces, even in finite-dimensional settings."

=== Books ===
Mas-Colell is the author or co-author of:

- Mas-Colell, Andreu (2016). General equilibrium and game theory: ten papers. Cambridge, Massachusettes London, England: Harvard University Press. ISBN 978-0-674-72873-8.
- Hart, Sergiu; Mas-Colell, Andreu (2013). Simple Adaptive Strategies: From Regret-Matching to Uncoupled Dynamics. World Scientific Series in Economic Theory. Vol. 4. WORLD SCIENTIFIC. doi:10.1142/8408. ISBN 978-981-4390-69-9.
- The Theory of General Economic Equilibrium: a Differentiable Approach (Econometric Society Monographs in Pure Theory 9, Cambridge University Press, 1990, ISBN 978-0-521-38870-2). This book was evaluated for Mathematical Reviews by Dave Furth, who wrote that

Mas-Colell's book is one of the first and still one of the most complete and most rigorous of the few textbooks on the applications of differential topology and global analysis to the theory of general economic equilibrium. .... People working in the field ought to own and to have used it already for some time. So those still wanting to consult for the first time and perhaps wanting to buy the book must be mathematicians interested in economic applications of the above-mentioned mathematical subjects. They will not regret consulting and/or buying it; the book is excellent.

- Microeconomic Theory (with Michael Dennis Whinston, Jerry R. Green, Oxford University Press, 1995, ISBN 978-0-19-507340-9). Johansson (2004) writes that this was "the most commonly used textbook in microeconomics", Jönköping excepted (the investigation covers all economics Ph.D. programs in Sweden for the academic year 2003-04).
- Noncooperative approaches to the theory of perfect competition. New York: Academic Press. 1982. ISBN 9780124767508.

== Awards and honors ==
Mas-Colell is a foreign associate of the United States National Academy of Sciences, a foreign honorary member of the American Economic Association, a fellow of the American Academy of Arts and Sciences, a member of the Academia Europaea, a member of the Institute of Catalan Studies, a fellow of the Real Academia de Ciencias Morales y Políticas, and a fellow of the Econometric Society. He has received honorary doctorates from the University of Alicante in Spain, the University of Toulouse and HEC Paris in France, the National University of the South in Argentina, and the University of Chicago in the United States. He is a recipient of the Creu de Sant Jordi, the highest civil honor of Catalonia, and of the King Juan Carlos Prize in Economics.

Also he has received the 2009 BBVA Foundation Frontiers of Knowledge Award in Economy, Finance and Management (co-winner with Hugo F. Sonnenschein).

In honor of his 65th birthday and his service on the European Research Council, two conferences were held in his honor at Pompeu Fabra in 2009, the Journal of Mathematical Economics published a special issue in his honor, and he was awarded the Medal of Honor of the university.

In 2024, the University of Minnesota conferred its Outstanding Achievement Award on Mas-Colell at a ceremony in Barcelona. The award cites him as "a pioneering researcher in economic theory, a builder of academic institutions, and a leader in graduate education in economics."

In 2025, Mas-Colell received the Alexandre Pedrós Award from the Societat Econòmica Barcelonesa d'Amics del País.

== See also ==
- Clara Ponsatí i Obiols
