= Kuncl =

Kuncl is a surname. Notable people with the surname include:

- Martin Kuncl (born 1984), Czech footballer
- Ralph Kuncl, American neurologist and academic
