= Susan Pardee Baker =

American professor emeritus of health policy and management

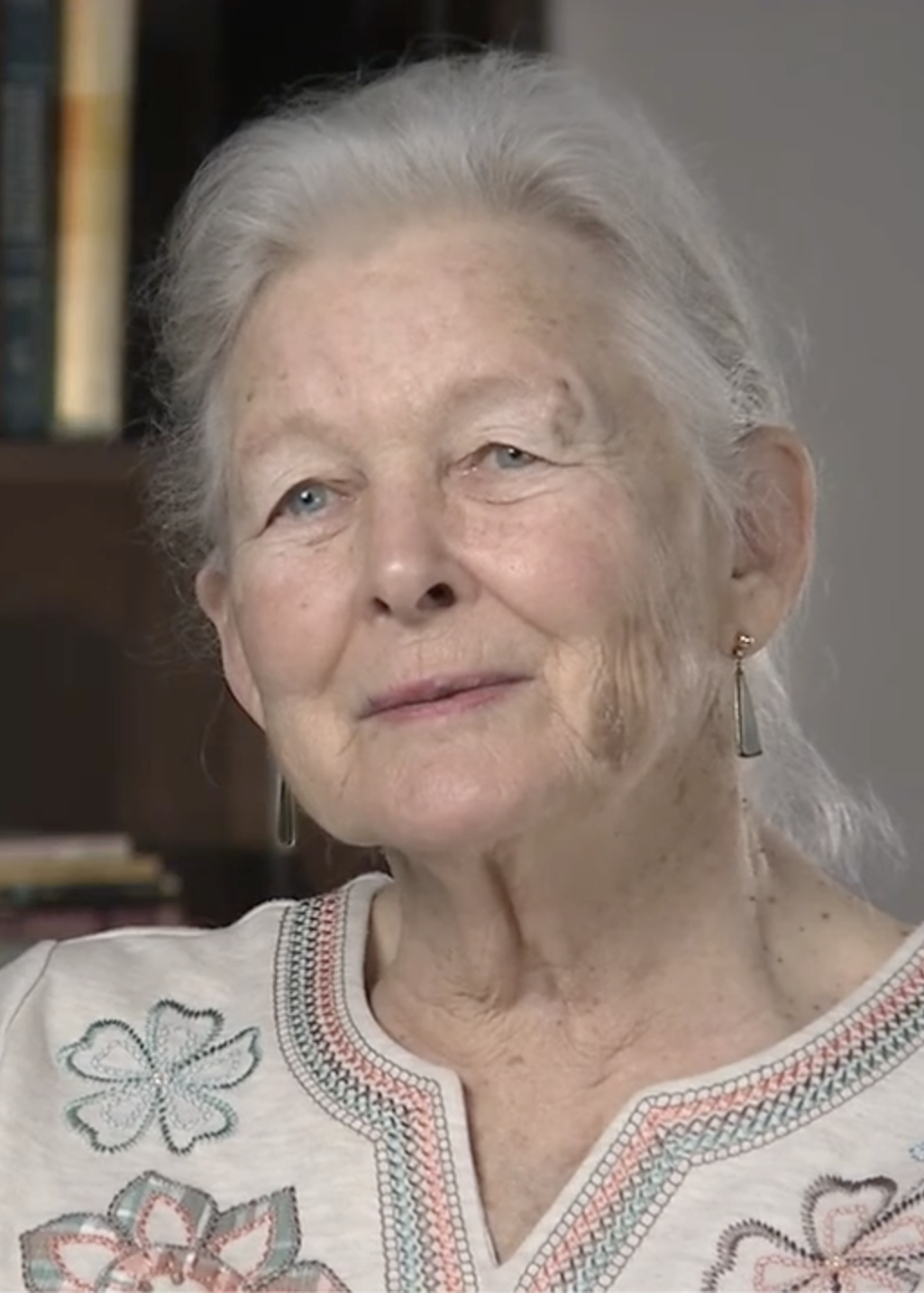
- Born: Susan Pardee; May 31, 1930 (age 95); Atlanta, Georgia
- Education: Cornell University (BA); Johns Hopkins University (MPH)
- Known for: Center for Injury Research and Policy
- Spouse: Timothy D. Baker
- Children: 3
- Awards: Calderone Prize (2010)
- Scientific career
- Fields: Injury prevention Injury Severity Scores

Susan Pardee Baker is a professor emeritus of health policy and management at the Johns Hopkins Bloomberg School of Public Health and an injury prevention expert. She served as the first director of the Johns Hopkins Center for Injury Research and Policy. She is also known for developing Injury Severity Scores.

== Education ==
Baker earned a bachelor's degree in zoology from Cornell University in 1951.

Encouraged by her husband, Timothy D. Baker, a late professor of international health at Johns Hopkins, she earned her Master's in Public Health from the Johns Hopkins Bloomberg School of Public Health in 1968. Baker received an honorary Doctor of Science degree from the University North Carolina in 1998.

== Career ==
After earning her MPH, Baker joined the Johns Hopkins Bloomberg School of Public Health faculty as a research associate. She quickly became an assistant professor of public health administration in 1971, and associate professor of health science administration with a joint appointment in environmental health services in 1975. Baker was later promoted to professor of health policy and management in 1983, while holding joint appointments at the School of Medicine, in the pediatric and emergency medicine departments. She has been the associate department chairman of health policy and management at Johns Hopkins University since 1997.

In 1987, Baker became the first director of the Johns Hopkins Center for Injury Research and Policy.

Baker served as a visiting professor at University of Minnesota School of Public Health between 1975 and 1987 and as a visiting lecturer in injury prevention at the Harvard School Public Health between 1984 and 1987. She also served as the Chairman of the National Review Panel for the national accident sampling system at the Department of Transportation between 1976 and 1981. Baker was also the Vice Chairman of the Commission on the Trauma Research National Research Council in 1984 and 1985 and member of an advisory commission on injury control at the Centers for Disease Control and Prevention since 1989. Baker served as vice chair of the National Academy of Science's Committee on Trauma Research and as president of the Association for the Advancement of Automotive Medicine, finding that infants were at especially high risk of being killed in car crashes, which contributed to the passage of child passenger protection laws and graduated driver licensing (GDL).

== Research interests ==
For over forty years, Baker has expanded the field and study of injury prevention and made it a priority in public health, both research and policy-wise. Her additional areas of research focus include fatalities related to aviation and motor vehicles and pedestrians; occupational injury; carbon monoxide poisoning; homicide; suicide; the use of drugs in adolescent suicide; drowning; childhood asphyxiation and choking; house fires; and falls in the elderly.

Based in large part on her work, the National Academy of Sciences organized a panel focused on injury in the 1980s, which resulted in its publication, Injury in America. The publication led to the development of the National Center for Injury Prevention and Control at the Centers for Disease Control. She is also recognized worldwide as a leader in her field and is an advisor to the World Health Organization. As a licensed private pilot, she has conducted plane crash analyses in the Colorado Rockies and on commuter and instructional aircraft crashes, having served on the Armed Forces Epidemiological Board from 1996 to 2000.

== Awards and honors ==
Baker was the recipient of the Charles A. Dana award for pioneering achievements in health in 1989. She is the recipient of the 1996 Johns Hopkins University Distinguished Alumnus award and has also received the 1999 Award for Excellence from the American Public Health Association. She has been recognized by the American Trauma Society, the Centers for Disease Control and Prevention's National Center for Injury Prevention and Control, and the National Association of Medical Examiners. In addition, in 2006, she was inducted into the Maryland Women's Hall of Fame and received the Stebbins Award from the Johns Hopkins Bloomberg School Public Health.

In 2010, Baker was awarded the Calderone Prize, considered the preeminent award in the field of public health, by the Columbia University Mailman School of Public Health.

== Personal life ==
Baker's husband was Timothy D. Baker, a leader in the field of international health and former Johns Hopkins Bloomberg School of Public Health professor.

== Bibliography ==
- The Injury Fact Book
