= Gene Block =

American academic administrator and biologist

6th Chancellor of the University of California, Los Angeles
- In office August 1, 2007 – July 31, 2024
- Preceded by: Albert Carnesale; Norman Abrams (acting)
- Succeeded by: Julio Frenk

Personal details
- Born: August 17, 1948 (age 78) Monticello, New York, U.S.
- Education: Stanford University (BA); University of Oregon (MS, PhD)
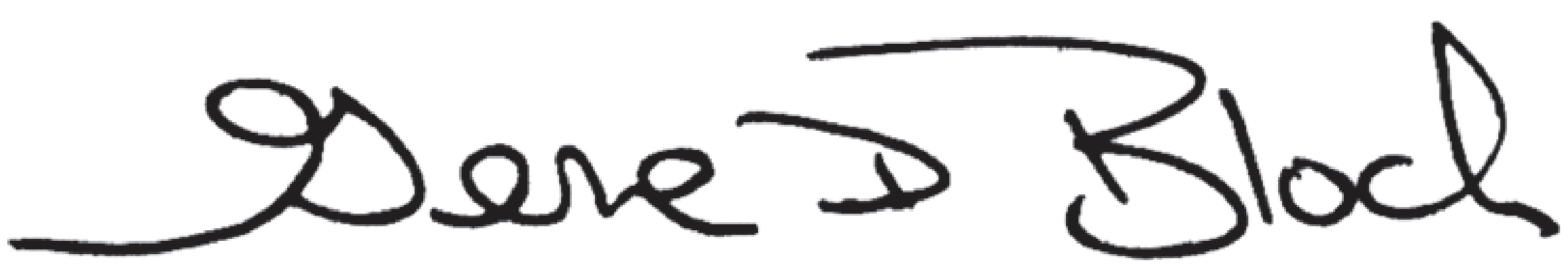
- Signature
- Scientific career
- Fields: Neurobiology
- Workplaces: University of Virginia; University of California, Los Angeles
- Thesis: Efferent control of the circadian oscillator in the eye of Aplysia (1975)
- Doctoral advisor: Marvin Gordon-Lickey
- Other academic advisors: Donald Kennedy; Colin Pittendrigh
- Doctoral students: Douglas G. McMahon
- Other notable students: Andrew Millar; Nancy L. Wayne

Gene David Block (born August 17, 1948) is an American biologist. He served as the 6th chancellor of the University of California, Los Angeles from August 2007 to July 2024. Previously at the University of Virginia, he served as executive vice president and provost from 2001 to 2007, as vice president for research and public service from 1998 to 2001, and as vice provost for research from 1993 to 1998.

== Early life and education ==
Block was born in Monticello, New York, the grandson of Jewish immigrants from Eastern Europe. His father and uncle owned Mountain Dairies, a retail/wholesale distributor that served many of the hotels and camps that populated Catskill region of New York. During summers, he worked at the dairy as a truck driver. He played varsity tennis at Monticello High School.

Block attended Foothill College and then received a Bachelor of Arts with a major in psychology from Stanford University in 1970. He received a Master of Science in 1972 and a Doctor of Philosophy in 1975 in psychology from the University of Oregon.

From 1975 to 1978, he returned to Stanford for postdoctoral work with Donald Kennedy (who later became the 8th president of Stanford) and Colin Pittendrigh (who is known as the “father of biological timing"). During his postdoctoral research years, Block studied how voluntary movements inhibit sensory feedback in the crayfish working in the Kennedy lab while studying issues of circadian biology with Colin Pittendrigh.

== Career ==
=== Academic administration ===
==== University of Virginia ====
In 1978, Block became a member of the faculty in the Department of Biology of University of Virginia. Here, Block served as the vice provost for research from 1993 to 1998, vice president for research and public service from 1998 to 2001, and then in 2001 he was appointed as executive vice president and provost. Furthermore, during this time from 1991 to 2002, Block also served as the founding director of the National Science Foundation Science and Technology Center in Biological Timing.

According to Block, “The center raised the national visibility of the University in biological and medical research, and gave us reputational leverage in the U.S. as well as in Europe and Japan [...] We’ve done some high-risk research that has paid off greatly; some of it has fundamentally changed our understanding of biological processes.”

One of the center's biggest advances, largely by Joseph Takahashi, was the development of a mutant mouse that allowed for the identification and cloning of the “Clock” gene for the biological clock in a mouse in 1997. This was the first such gene to be identified at the molecular level in a mammal. This groundbreaking discovery was a result of the Clock Genome Project, which uses "forward genetics" to discover the genes regulating circadian clocks in mice, fruit flies, and plants. In addition, this work also led to the discovery of many other genes that regulate the biological clock.

In 1997 and 1998, the reputable journal Science ranked the findings of the NSF Center in Biological Timings among the top 10 in biological research breakthroughs.

Three of the NSF Center investigators, Jeffrey C. Hall, Michael Rosbash and Michael W. Young, received the 2017 Nobel Prize in Physiology or Medicine “for their discoveries of molecular mechanisms controlling the circadian rhythm.”

==== University of California, Los Angeles ====
Block was appointed Chancellor of UCLA in 2007. His selection was announced on December 21, 2006, succeeding interim office holder Norman Abrams on August 1, 2007. In his inaugural address at UCLA, Block shared that his top priorities are to advance academic excellence, financial stability, diversity and civic engagement. He has called for UCLA to deepen its engagement with Los Angeles and to increase access for students from underrepresented populations. Under Block's leadership, UCLA has seen an increase in student diversity on campus thanks to innovative efforts to recruit in diverse communities, and in 2015, UCLA reached pre-California Proposition 209 levels, enrolling 279 African American freshmen, on par with the African American share of California public high school graduates. UCLA has also increased the number of low- to middle-income students enrolled.

On February 24, 2014, Block published an open letter to the campus community, expressing his opposition to Proposition 209, stating that the proposed merit-based selection system would damage diversity on campus.

Block's push for entrepreneurship on campus has fostered innovation and resulted in UCLA as the top university for creating startups based on campus research. Additionally, to foster a deeper commitment to Los Angeles among UCLA students, Block oversaw the formation of the annual Volunteer Day event, in which thousands of students volunteer in schools, parks, food banks, veterans’ clinics and elsewhere at the beginning of each academic year. Block also implemented UCLA's two Grand Challenges, which are aimed at understanding, treating and preventing depression worldwide, and moving Los Angeles toward 100 percent renewable energy, 100 percent locally sourced water and enhanced ecosystem health by 2050.

During his tenure, Block has faced the challenge of steering UCLA through a severe budget crisis and tuition increases. To address reductions in state funding and advance his priorities, Block is leading the largest fundraising campaign by a public university, aiming to raise $4.2 billion to support student scholarships and fellowships, research projects and new construction on campus in honor of UCLA's centennial in 2019.

He has been widely criticized for the 2022 suspension of highly awarded professor of ecology Priyanga Amarasekare without documentation, viewed as retaliation for her calls for reform of a culture of discrimination at UCLA.

Block held UCLA faculty appointments in psychiatry and bio-behavioral sciences in the David Geffen School of Medicine and in integrative biology and physiology in the College of Letters and Science.

On August 3, 2023, Block announced his impending retirement nearly a year in advance.

On April 25, 2024, a pro-Palestinian occupation protest began at UCLA to protest the administration's investments in Israel amid the Gaza war. On May 1, violent clashes were reported shortly after Block declared that the encampment was "unlawful" and students who remained would face disciplinary action. Ultimately, opponents of Block failed to force him to resign, as neither censure nor a vote of no confidence passed in the UCLA Academic Senate on May 16, 2024. The vote on censure was tied, 88–88. He officially stepped down on July 31, 2024, ending his seventeen-year tenure as chancellor.

=== Academic research ===
==== Cell-autonomous circadian pacemakers ====
While at the University of Virginia, Block worked extensively with his graduate student, Douglas G. McMahon, the 1986 winner of the Society for Neuroscience's Donald B. Lindsley Prize in Behavioral Neuroscience, on the functioning of the circadian pacemaker system at the cellular level in Bulla gouldiana. In 1984, Block's students conducted a continuous 74-hour intracellular recording in constant darkness that demonstrated that basal retinal neurons (BRN) in the Bulla eye exhibit clear circadian rhythms. These rhythms were also shown to be correlated one-for-one with compound action potentials produced by the optic nerve. The change in membrane potential of the BRNs, which are electrically coupled, were shown to precede or occur simultaneously with the increased compound action potential frequency. An increase in firing frequency, and depolarization of the BRNs, was seen during the day, and the reverse at night. These results demonstrated that the BRNs were at minimum an output for the pacemaker pathway and provided evidence that they were good candidates for being circadian pacemaker neurons.

This research was expanded several years later by a breakthrough study published in Science in which Stephan Michel and others working in Block's laboratory demonstrated that circadian rhythms in BRN membrane conductance could persist spontaneously in isolated BRNs. These spontaneous circadian rhythms were shown for BRNs in isolation from other retinal cells and in isolation from each other. They showed that these circadian rhythms in membrane conductance were caused primarily by a potassium ion current. BRNs in isolation demonstrated the same patterns shown in Block's previous work in which membrane conductance decreased at dawn and increased at dusk. That similar patterns were seen in isolated cells as in previous multiple cell cultures provided the first strong evidence that individual neurons possessed the capacity to generate circadian rhythms. This research definitively concluded that BRNs are both necessary and sufficient for photoentrainment in Bulla.

==== Necessity of calcium flux for rhythmicity ====
Block and colleagues hypothesized that ion movement across cell membranes plays a role in the generation of circadian rhythms. In 2005, his lab measured rhythms in rat suprachiasmatic nuclei (SCN) in various concentrations of calcium ions. Block found that as calcium concentration decreased, thus lowering the transmembrane ion movement, the amplitude of circadian rhythmicity also decreased. With no calcium added, there was no circadian rhythm at all. Block's lab repeated the experiment with rat liver tissue and mouse SCN tissue and found the same results in each case. This demonstrated that across species and tissues, transmembrane calcium flux is necessary for the generation of circadian rhythms. However, there are still some questions about the function of calcium flux. In this experiment, Block also tried adding calcium channel Blockers to the tissues. Rhythmicity did disappear, but it took several cycles, and it is unknown why rhythmicity was not immediately abolished. In addition, Block suspects that calcium flux plays a role in the entrainment of the mammalian clock to the environment, similar to its role in mollusk entrainment.

==== Effects of aging on the circadian clock ====
Block has also studied the effect that aging has on the circadian system, collaborating with other leading chronobiologists including Michael Menaker. In 2002, he studied rhythmicity in rats of various ages and found that aging affected rhythmicity differently in different tissues. In the SCN, the intrinsic period shortened with age, while lung tissue often became arrhythmic (showing sporadic activity) and pineal and kidney tissues became phase advanced. In 2008, Block exposed rats of various ages to different light cycles, and found that phase advances took longer in the SCN in old rats than in young rats, but pineal tissues advanced faster in older rats. Liver tissues did not phase shift at all when the light cycle was advanced. These studies together have shown how complex the aging process is in the circadian system. Block notes that some, though not all, of these changes are likely influenced by diminishing synchronizing signals from the SCN. In 2006, Block observed that jetlag significantly increased the death rate in older mice, which highlights the medical importance of understanding the aging process of the circadian system.

== Honors and awards ==
- 2015: Friends of Semel Institute Visionary Award
- 2010: Fellow, American Academy of Arts and Sciences
- 2009: Los Angeles NAACP Foundation Presidents’ Award
- 2006: Japan Prize in Biology selection committee
- 2004: Navigator Award, Virginia Piedmont Technology Council
- 2003: Pioneer Award, National Science Foundation (NSF Centers Program)
- 1998: Commonwealth of Virginia, Outstanding Public Service Award
- 1997: Fellow, American Association for the Advancement of Science
- 1997: Chairman, Gordon Conference on Chronobiology
- 1997: Visiting Fellow, Japan Society for the Promotion of Science
- 1996 – 1998: President, Society for Research on Biological Rhythms
- 1995: Glaser Distinguished Visiting Professor, Florida International University
- 1993: Alumni Council Thomas Jefferson Professor (endowed chair)
- 1988 – 1991: Treasurer: Society for Research on Biological Rhythms
- 1983 – 1988: Research Career Development Award, National Institutes of Health

== Personal life ==
In 1970, Block married Carol Kullback, also from Monticello; they have two grown children.

== See also ==
- Michael Menaker

Academic offices
Preceded by Albert Carnesale	6th Chancellor of the University of California, Los Angeles; 2007 – 2024	Succeeded by Julio Frenk
