= Eddie Dekel =

American economist

Eddie Dekel (born September 28, 1958) is an Israeli-American economist. He is a professor at Northwestern University and Tel Aviv University. His fields of research include game theory and decision theory.

Born in New York City, Dekel studied economics and statistics at Tel Aviv University before earning a PhD in economics from Harvard University under supervision of Andreu Mas-Colell and Jerry Green.

In 1996, he was elected a Fellow of the Econometric Society, and in 2008 was elected to the American Academy of Arts and Sciences.
