= Alexandre Mas =

American economist

Academic background
- Education: B.A. (1999), Macalester College; M.A. (2001), Ph.D. (2004), Princeton University
- Doctoral advisor: Alan Krueger
- Influences: Andreu Mas-Colell

Academic work
- Discipline: Labor economics
- Institutions: Princeton University, University of California, Berkeley
- Website: https://sites.google.com/view/alex-mas/home; Information at IDEAS / RePEc

Alexandre Mas (born c. 1978) is William S. Tod Professor of Economics and Public Affairs at Princeton University, Director of the Industrial Relations Section at Princeton University, and Director of the Labor Studies program of the National Bureau of Economic Research. He is a former Chief Economist of the United States Department of Labor and Associate Director for Economic Policy at the Office of Management and Budget.

== Selected works ==
- Mas, Alexandre, and Enrico Moretti. "Peers at work." American Economic Review 99, no. 1 (2009): 112-45.
- Card, David, Alexandre Mas, Enrico Moretti, and Emmanuel Saez. "Inequality at work: The effect of peer salaries on job satisfaction." American Economic Review 102, no. 6 (2012): 2981-3003.
- Card, David, Alexandre Mas, and Jesse Rothstein. "Tipping and the Dynamics of Segregation." The Quarterly Journal of Economics 123, no. 1 (2008): 177-218.
- Mas, Alexandre. "Pay, reference points, and police performance." The Quarterly Journal of Economics 121, no. 3 (2006): 783-821.
- Mas, Alexandre, and Amanda Pallais. "Valuing alternative work arrangements." American Economic Review 107, no. 12 (2017): 3722-59.
