= Timothy D. Baker =

American public health academic (1925–2013)

- Born: Timothy Danforth Baker; July 4, 1925; Baltimore, Maryland, US
- Died: December 17, 2013 (aged 88)
- Education: Johns Hopkins University (BA); University of Maryland (MD); Johns Hopkins University (MPH)
- Known for: International health
- Spouse: Susan Baker
- Children: 3
- Awards: American Public Health Association Lifetime Achievement Award (1993)
- Scientific career
- Fields: International Health

Timothy Danforth Baker (July 4, 1925 – December 17, 2013) was a professor of international health at the Johns Hopkins Bloomberg School of Public Health. He was also one of the founders of the study of international health.

== Early life ==
Baker was born the son of Frank A. Baker, former president of National Sash Weight Corp, and Alice Candler Baker, a landscape artist, in Baltimore, Maryland. Baker was raised in Mount Washington. Baker credited his desire to travel the world as a physician after reading a book about an American doctor who had practiced worldwide when he was still just 12 years old.

In 1942, Baker began at Johns Hopkins University studying chemical engineering, but after taking time off from his studies to serve in World War II in the United States Air Force on an assignment in the base's hospital in 1943 after an oversupply of would-be pilots grounded him, his interest returned to medicine.

== Education ==
Baker earned a bachelor's degree from Johns Hopkins University in 1948. He then earned his medical degree from the University of Maryland in 1952, followed by a master's degree in public health from the Johns Hopkins University School of Hygiene and Public Health in 1954.

Baker then pursued advanced medical training at St. Bartholomew's Hospital in London and at the University of Maryland Hospital before completing his residency at the New York Department of Public Health.

== Career ==
Baker began his career in public health in New York State as a district health officer.

In 1959, Baker returned to Johns Hopkins as an assistant professor of Public Health Administration and Assistant Dean of the School of Public Health. In the decade that followed, he co-founded the world's first academic department of international health with Ernest Lyman Stebbins (which opened in 1961) and also founded the general preventive medicine residency program. Baker built the department of international health with then-chair Carl E. Taylor and professor William Reinke, while also playing an instrumental role in establishing one of Johns Hopkins' first endowed professorships, now the Edgar Berman Professorship in International Health.

Baker served on the governing council of the American Public Health Association and also was the chair of both the epidemiology and the international health sections for the APHA. Over the course of his career, he served on the editorial boards of American Journal of Public Health, Health Services Research, Journal of Family and Community Medicine, and Maryland Medical Journal.

== International career ==
Baker's first international experiences came when he went to combat malaria in India and Ceylon (present-day Sri Lanka). During the 1950s, Baker became an assistant chief of the Health Division for the U.S. Technical Cooperation Mission (which later became USAID) and helped convince Indian government officials to increase spending on the malaria eradication campaign.

He was a highly sought-after health systems consultant to state governments and national governments on five continents, as his career spanned 50 years and included work in more than 40 countries. In fact, Baker consulted for the health systems of four state governments and 24 national governments on five continents He was also a pioneer in conducting the first health workforce studies across South America as well as in Korea, Taiwan, Thailand, and Vietnam. Between 1986 and 1993, he served as the founding director of the Hubert H. Humphrey Fellowship Program at the Johns Hopkins University School of Hygiene and Public Health, which trained senior foreign health professionals.

Baker is often credited as being one of the first people to recognize the importance of injury as a cause of disability when trying to understand the burden of disease, especially in developing countries.

== Awards and honors ==
In 1993, Baker received the Lifetime Achievement Award from the American Public Health Association.

In 2014, the Delta Omega honorary public health society established the Dr. Timothy Baker Award for International Health Development.

== Personal life ==
Baker was married to Susan Pardee Baker, a pioneer in injury prevention and founder of the Johns Hopkins Center for Injury Research and Policy. He had two sons, Timothy D. Baker Jr. and David Baker, and one daughter, Susan L. Baker. He also had two grandchildren, Timothy and Daniel. Baker enjoyed rock-hunting, camping, skiing, and writing haiku, while his favorite pastime was turning the minerals he found into jewelry for family and friends.
