= Nancy L. Wayne =

American physiologist, academic administrator

Nancy Lynne Wayne (born 1960) is an American physiologist, academic administrator, and researcher. She is professor of physiology at the David Geffen School of Medicine at UCLA, where she has been the principal investigator of a reproductive physiology lab, publishing research on the impact of environment signals and endocrine-disruptors on the reproductive system. She has also carried out notable work on sexism, professional development, and laboratory safety.

== Career ==
In 1992, Wayne joined the Department of Physiology at the David Geffen School of Medicine at UCLA. She was principal investigator of a reproductive physiology laboratory and published over 50 peer-reviewed manuscripts, including investigations of the impact of endocrine-disrupting chemicals on embryonic development. Her research later shifted to the social sciences and gender issues, including an investigation of gender bias in leadership among medical students and the impact of gender, sports, and video gaming on driving skills of novice drivers.

Wayne was appointed in 2010 as UCLA Associate Vice Chancellor for Research with a laboratory safety portfolio (2010-2019) in the aftermath of a fatal chemistry accident. She guided UCLA, the UC System, and university members of the Association for Public and Land Grant Universities (APLU) to develop a greater culture of safety in its research and teaching laboratories. She was co-founder of the UC Center for Laboratory Safety, and served as its first Chair of the Advisory Board (2011-2019). The mission of the Center is to conduct and support research in laboratory safety and translate into best practices, communicate and engage with researchers and health & safety professionals on laboratory safety, and provide expert advice and consultation regarding laboratory safety.

In 2015, Wayne founded Women Advancing Together, a professional development company, which has provided workshops and consultations to help women advance their careers at over two dozen universities, conferences, and healthcare organizations including Yale, Cornell, and the University of Michigan.

In 2018, Wayne was awarded a one-year leadership fellowship from the American Council on Education (ACE), working at the University of Redlands under the mentorship of president Ralph Kuncl. In 2019, she continued her work at the University of Redlands with a one-year appointment as Deputy to the President for Strategic University Partnerships (2019-2020).
