= Alan Garber =

American physician (born 1955)

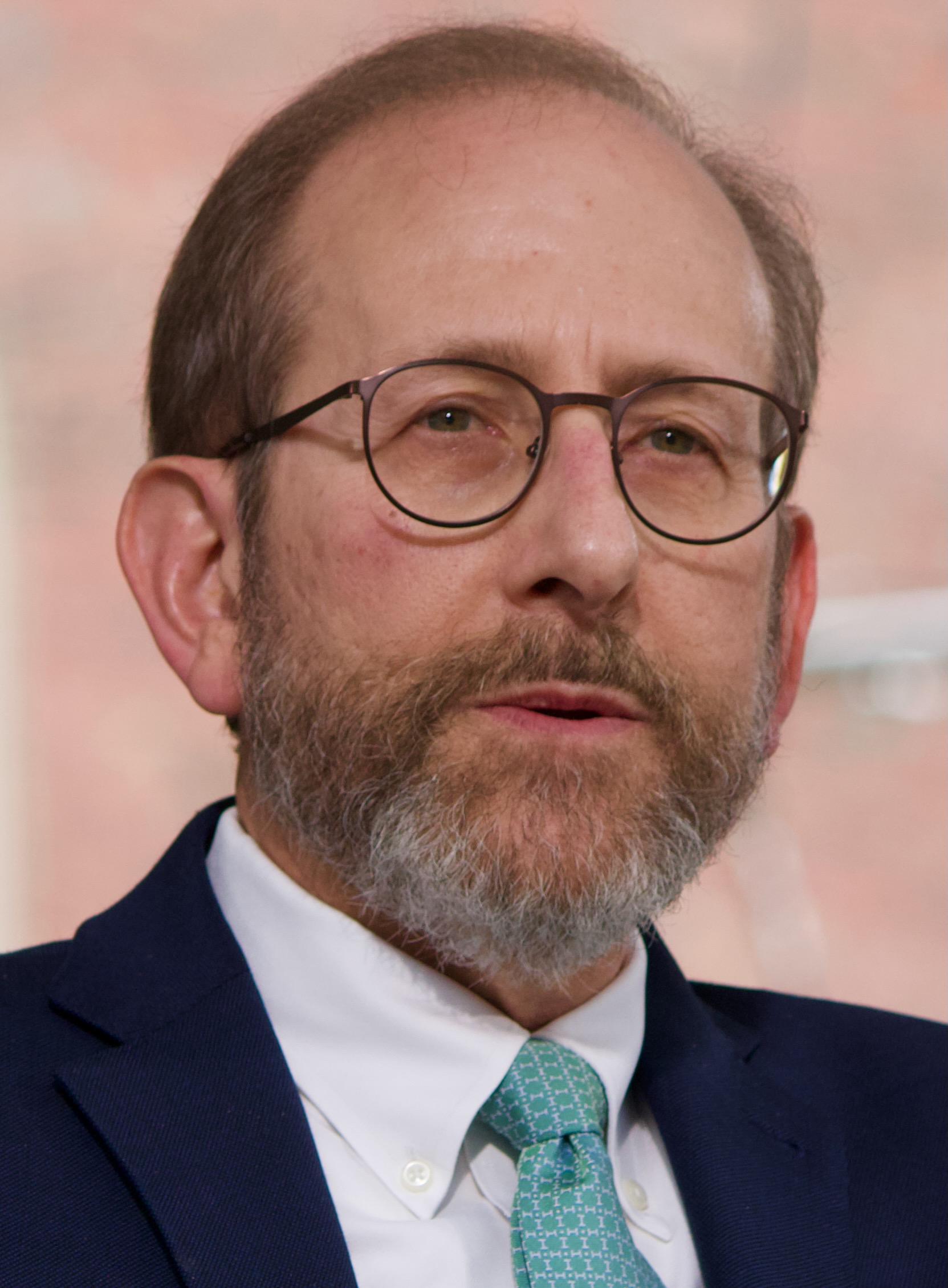
- Garber in 2025

31st President of Harvard University
- Incumbent
- Assumed office January 2, 2024 (Note: Acting: January 2 – August 2, 2024)
- Preceded by: Claudine Gay

6th Provost of Harvard University
- In office September 1, 2011 – March 14, 2024
- Preceded by: Steven Hyman
- Succeeded by: John F. Manning

Personal details
- Born: Alan Michael Garber; May 7, 1955 (age 71) Rock Island, Illinois, U.S.
- Spouse: Anne Yahanda
- Children: 4
- Education: Harvard University (BA, MA, PhD); Stanford University (MD)
- Scientific career
- Fields: Health economics
- Workplaces: Stanford University; Harvard University
- Thesis: Costs and Control of Antibiotic Resistance (1982)
- Doctoral advisors: Martin Feldstein; Zvi Griliches; Richard Zeckhauser

Alan Michael Garber (born May 7, 1955) is an American physician and health economist who has been the 31st president of Harvard University since August 2, 2024. Previously, he served as provost of Harvard University from 2011 to March 2024. Prior to joining Harvard, Garber was a faculty member at Stanford University.

== Early life and education ==
Garber was born in Rock Island, Illinois, in 1955, to Jean and Harry Garber. His mother was a social worker, while his father owned a liquor store. Garber's twin sister, Deborah, is an artist and his older brother, David, made aliyah and lives in Jerusalem. Belonging to a Jewish family, Garber grew up attending synagogue and a Jewish summer camp. He attended Rock Island High School before graduating from Mather High School in Chicago in 1973.

Garber received a Bachelor of Arts degree in economics in 1977, a Master of Arts in economics in 1978, and a Ph.D. in economics in 1982, all from Harvard University. While pursuing his PhD at Harvard, he enrolled simultaneously at Stanford University, where he received a Doctor of Medicine degree with research honors in 1983. He later reflected that he was "a reluctant and ambivalent pre-med" when starting college, switching his major from biochemistry to economics, but that his education led "eventually to a career that combined the two interests".

He completed his residency training in internal medicine at Harvard Medical School-affiliated Brigham and Women's Hospital in Boston in 1986.

== Career ==
Garber began his teaching career as an assistant professor at Stanford University in 1986. His research focused on cost-effectiveness in healthcare. While at Stanford, he also worked as a clinician at the Veterans Affairs Medical Center in Palo Alto. Garber's tenure at Stanford ended in 2011, when he left to succeed Steven Hyman as the provost of Harvard University on September 1, 2011. He served as provost until March 14, 2024, when John F. Manning took on the position on an interim basis.

Garber has held various positions and titles since joining Harvard, including the Mallinckrodt Professor of Health Care Policy at Harvard Medical School, Professor of Economics in the Harvard Faculty of Arts and Sciences, Professor of Public Policy at Harvard Kennedy School, and Professor in the Department of Health Policy and Management in the Harvard T.H. Chan School of Public Health.

He succeeded Claudine Gay as the president of Harvard University in 2024. Garber was initially appointed as an interim president, on January 2, 2024. On August 2, the Harvard Corporation announced that he would be the permanent president of the university for a fixed term of three years ending at the conclusion of the 2026–2027 academic year. He was installed as the 31st president of Harvard University on December 7, 2024, in a private ceremony at Menschel Hall, one of the Harvard Art Museums. In 2025, he was elected to the American Philosophical Society.

On December 15, 2025, Harvard announced that Garber would remain as the university's president indefinitely.

== Tenure ==
=== Opposition to graduate student unionization ===
In July 2016, the Harvard University Office of the Provost launched a web page in response to efforts to unionize its graduate students. On August 23, 2016, following the Columbia decision that restored union rights to teaching and research assistants, the provost office wrote in an email to students, "we continue to believe that the relationship between students and the University is primarily about education, and that unionization will disrupt academic programs and freedoms, mentoring, and research at Harvard." Following a decision by the regional director of the National Labor Relations Board that Harvard was in violation of the Excelsior rule, Garber defended the university appeal to the National Labor Relations Board in Washington, D.C., writing that the university "believes that the November 2016 election results, which reflect the votes and voices of well-informed students, should stand, and has appealed the Regional Director's decision to the contrary".

=== Private corporation board memberships ===
In October 2019, The Harvard Crimson reported that SEC filings record that since being appointed as Harvard's provost in 2011, Garber earned more than $2.7 million by serving on the boards of directors for two pharmaceutical companies, Exelixis and Vertex Pharmaceuticals. Garber responded that he had thoroughly disclosed his industry affiliations in conflict of interest forms for the university, and the companies indicated that his compensation was normal for board members.

=== 2024 commencement ===
The Harvard administration drew criticism for preventing 13 undergraduates from collecting their diplomas at the May 2024 commencement ceremony as a consequence of their participation in pro-Palestine protests. Nearly 500 Harvard faculty and students criticized the sanctions and others identified the action as an example of an "Exception" to free speech. The decision was initially overturned by 115 faculty members of the Faculty of Arts and Sciences, but was reinstated by the Harvard Corporation later that week in May 2025.

=== Clash with the Trump administration ===
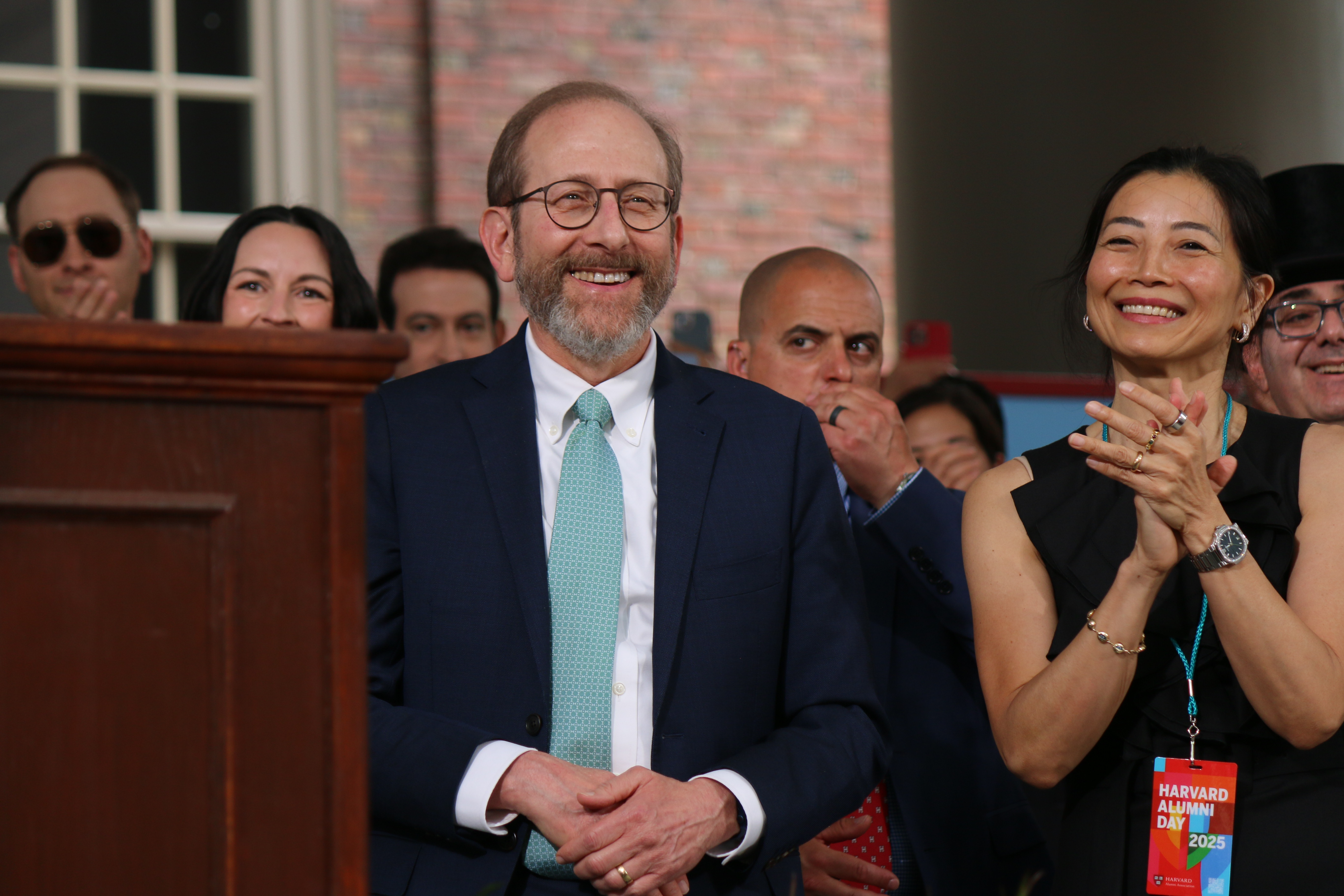
Garber at Harvard Alumni Day (June 6, 2025)

On April 11, 2025, the Trump administration sent a letter to Garber threatening to cut back billions in federal funding unless Harvard accepted government demands that included requirements to audit the viewpoints of student body, faculty, staff, and to "reduc[e] the power" of certain students, faculty, and administrators targeted because of their political views. It also demanded several pro-Palestinian student organizations to be dismantled and banned. On April 14, Garber announced that Harvard had informed the administration through its legal counsel that the university had refused the Trump administration's proposed agreement. Garber's decision was hailed by left-leaning political personalities including Barack Obama and Bernie Sanders. In response, the Trump administration began a series of legal assaults against the university, including asking the Internal Revenue Service to revoke the tax-exempt status of the university, freezing 2.2 billion dollars in federal funding to the university, and barring the university from enrolling international students. According to The Atlantic, Garber believes that Harvard did confront campus anti-Semitism.

== Personal life ==
Garber married Anne Yahanda, an oncologist, in 1988. They met at Brigham and Women’s Hospital, where both were completing post-graduate training. They have four children, all of whom attended Harvard University. Garber is an observant Jew.
