= Michael Whinston =

American economist (born 1959)

- Born: February 3, 1959 (age 67); New York City

Academic background
- Education: MIT; University of Pennsylvania
- Doctoral advisor: Franklin M. Fisher; Eric Maskin

Academic work
- Institutions: MIT; Northwestern University; Harvard University
- Doctoral students: Rebecca M. Henderson; Aviv Nevo
- Website: Information at IDEAS / RePEc

Michael D. Whinston is an American economist and currently the Sloan Fellows Professor at Massachusetts Institute of Technology. Previously he was the Robert E. and Emily H. King Professor at Northwestern University and is also a Fellow to the American Academy of Arts and Sciences and Econometric Society. Together with Andreu Mas-Colell and Jerry R. Green he authored the standard US graduate level microeconomics textbook, Microeconomic Theory.

== Education ==
Whinston received a bachelors of science in economics and an MBA in finance from Wharton at the University of Pennsylvania. He then went on to receive a PhD in economics from MIT.

== Personal life ==
Whinston is married to political theorist and Brown University professor Bonnie Honig.

== Honors ==
Frisch Medal: awarded the Frisch Medal in 2016 for a paper he co-authored with Ben Handel and Igal Handel titled “Equilibria in Health Exchanges: Adverse Selection Versus Reclassification Risk.”

Distinguished Fellow: received the Industrial Organization Society Distinguished Fellow Award for his contributions and leadership in the field of Industrial Organization.

Robert F. Lanzilliotti Prize: won the 2014 Robert F. Lanzilliotti Prize for his paper “Internal Vs. External Growth in Industries with Scale Economies: A Computational Model of Optimal Merger Policy,” co-authored with Ben Mermelstein, Volker Nocke, and Mark Satterthwaite. The award is given to the best paper in antitrust economics.
