= List of provosts of Harvard University =

The provost of Harvard University is the second-highest-ranking official at Harvard University after the President and typically the university's chief academic officer. The current provost is John Manning, who has served since 2024.

== List of provosts of Harvard University ==
The provost position was established at Harvard in October 1945 and abolished in 1953 after the resignation of its sole officeholder, Paul Herman Buck. It was later re-established in 1992 by Harvard president Neil Rudenstine.

No.	Picture	Name	Took office	Left office
1		Paul Herman Buck	1945	1953
2		Jerry Green	1992	1994
3		Albert Carnesale	1994	1997
4		Harvey V. Fineberg	1997	2001
5		Steven Hyman	2001	2011
6		Alan Garber	2011	2024
7		John F. Manning	2024	present
