= Harvey V. Fineberg =

American physician (born 1945)

Harvey Fineberg
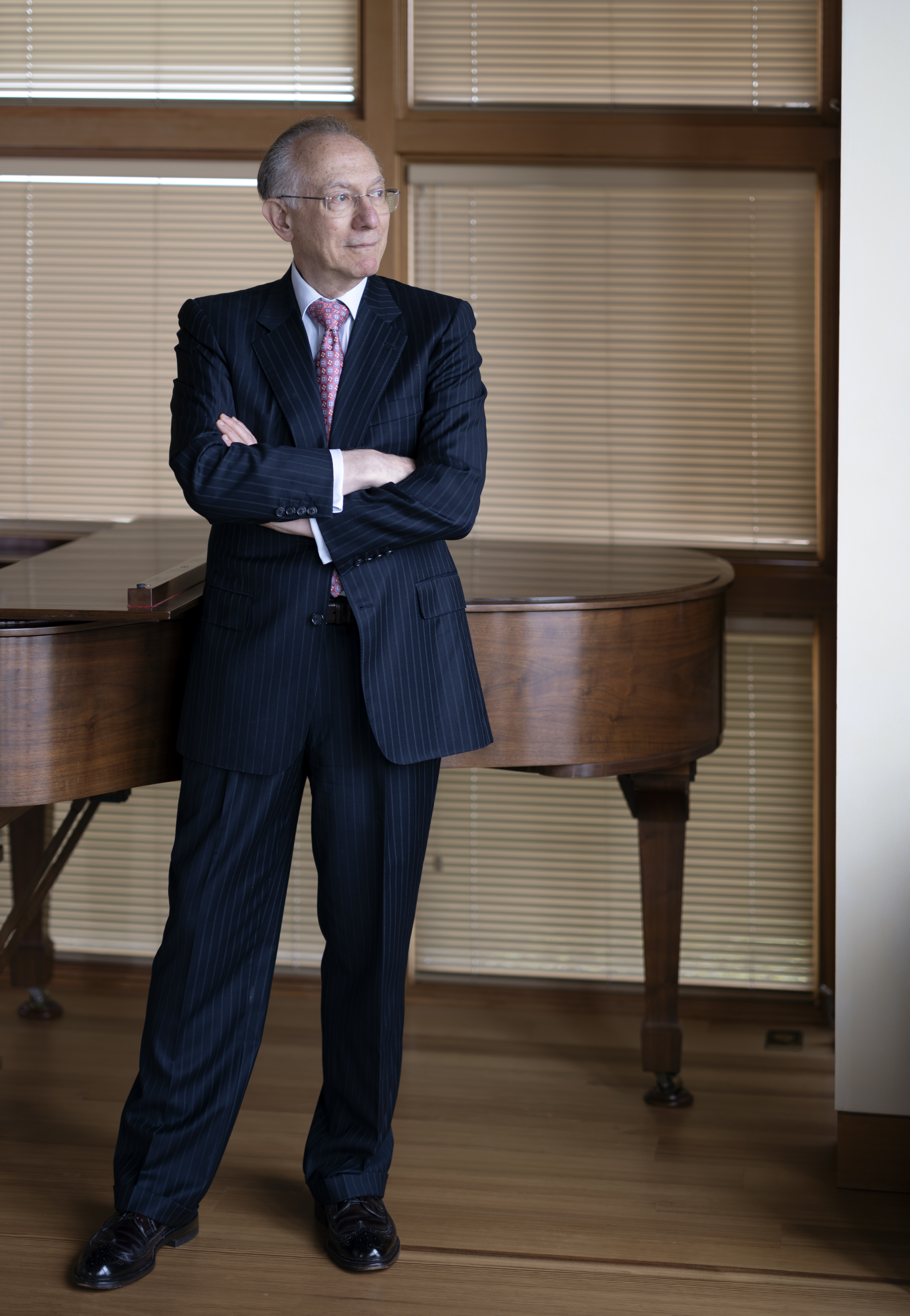
- Fineberg in 2021

4th Provost of Harvard University
- In office July 1, 1997 – December 10, 2001
- Preceded by: Albert Carnesale
- Succeeded by: Steven Hyman

Personal details
- Born: Harvey Vernon Fineberg; September 15, 1945 (age 80)
- Education: Harvard University (BA, MD, MPP, PhD)
- Scientific career
- Awards: Calderone Prize (2011)

Harvey Vernon Fineberg (born September 15, 1945) is an American physician. A noted researcher in the fields of health policy and medical decision making, his past research has focused on the process of policy development and implementation, assessment of medical technology, evaluation and use of vaccines, and dissemination of medical innovations. Fineberg has held several prominent positions over the course of his career, including Dean of the Harvard School of Public Health, Provost of Harvard University, and President of the Institute of Medicine, now the National Academy of Medicine.

== Education ==
Fineberg earned an A.B. in 1967 from Harvard College and an M.D. in 1971 from Harvard Medical School. He completed a residency in internal medicine at Beth Israel Hospital, a Harvard-affiliated hospital in Boston. He worked as a practicing physician at two Boston-area health centers from 1974 to 1984.

In addition to his clinical training, Fineberg earned an M.P.P. from Harvard Kennedy School in 1972 and a Ph.D. in government from Harvard's Graduate School of Arts and Sciences in 1980. He was selected as a member of the Harvard Society of Fellows.

== Academic career ==
He taught at Harvard Kennedy School from 1973 to 1981, and served on the faculty at the Harvard School of Public Health from 1973 to 1984, when he became the school's dean. He led the School of Public Health for 13 years before becoming the University Provost for 4 more years. In 2002, he became president of the Institute of Medicine (now National Academy of Medicine), where he ended his tenure in 2014.

Dr. Fineberg is co-author of the books Clinical Decision Analysis, Innovators in Physician Education, and The Epidemic that Never Was, also published under the title The Swine Flu Affair, an analysis of the controversial federal immunization program against swine flu in 1976. He has co-edited several books on such diverse topics as AIDS prevention, vaccine safety, and understanding risk in society. He has also authored numerous articles published in professional journals.

Fineberg helped found and served as president of the Society for Medical Decision Making and also served as consultant to the World Health Organization. At the National Academies of Sciences, Engineering and Medicine, he chaired and served on a number of panels dealing with health and science policy issues, including AIDS, vaccine safety, and reproducibility and replicability in scientific research. He has served as a member of the Public Health Council of Massachusetts (1976–1979), as chairman of the Health Care Technology Study Section of the National Center for Health Services Research (1982–1985), and as president of the Association of Schools of Public Health (1995–1996). Additionally, he served on the boards of a number of philanthropic organizations, including the William and Flora Hewlett Foundation, the Josiah Macy, Jr. Foundation, the François-Xavier Bagnoud Foundation (USA), and the China Medical Board. He is a member of the American Academy of Arts and Sciences and the American Philosophical Society. In 2026 he joined the board of directors of the California Council on Science and Technology.

He has received numerous awards and prizes, including the Joseph W. Mountin Prize from the Centers for Disease Control, the Wade Hampton Frost Prize from the Epidemiology Section of the American Public Health Association, the Calderone Prize in Public Health from Columbia University's Mailman School of Public Health, awarded Dr. Fineberg the highest prize in public health, from Academyhealth, and honorary degrees from a number of universities, including a Doctor of Laws from Harvard University in 2018.

From 2013 until 2018, Fineberg served as chairperson of the Carnegie Endowment for International Peace. He was succeeded by former U.S. secretary of commerce Penny Pritzker in May 2018. He is presently the president of the Gordon and Betty Moore Foundation. And he has been member of the advisory board of the Peter G. Peterson Foundation.

== Personal life ==
Fineberg is married to Dr. Mary E. Wilson, a noted expert in infectious diseases, travel medicine, and global health and adjunct professor at Harvard School of Public Health and visiting professor at University of California, San Francisco.
