= Calderone Prize =

Award for achievements in public health

Frank A. Calderone Prize in Public Health
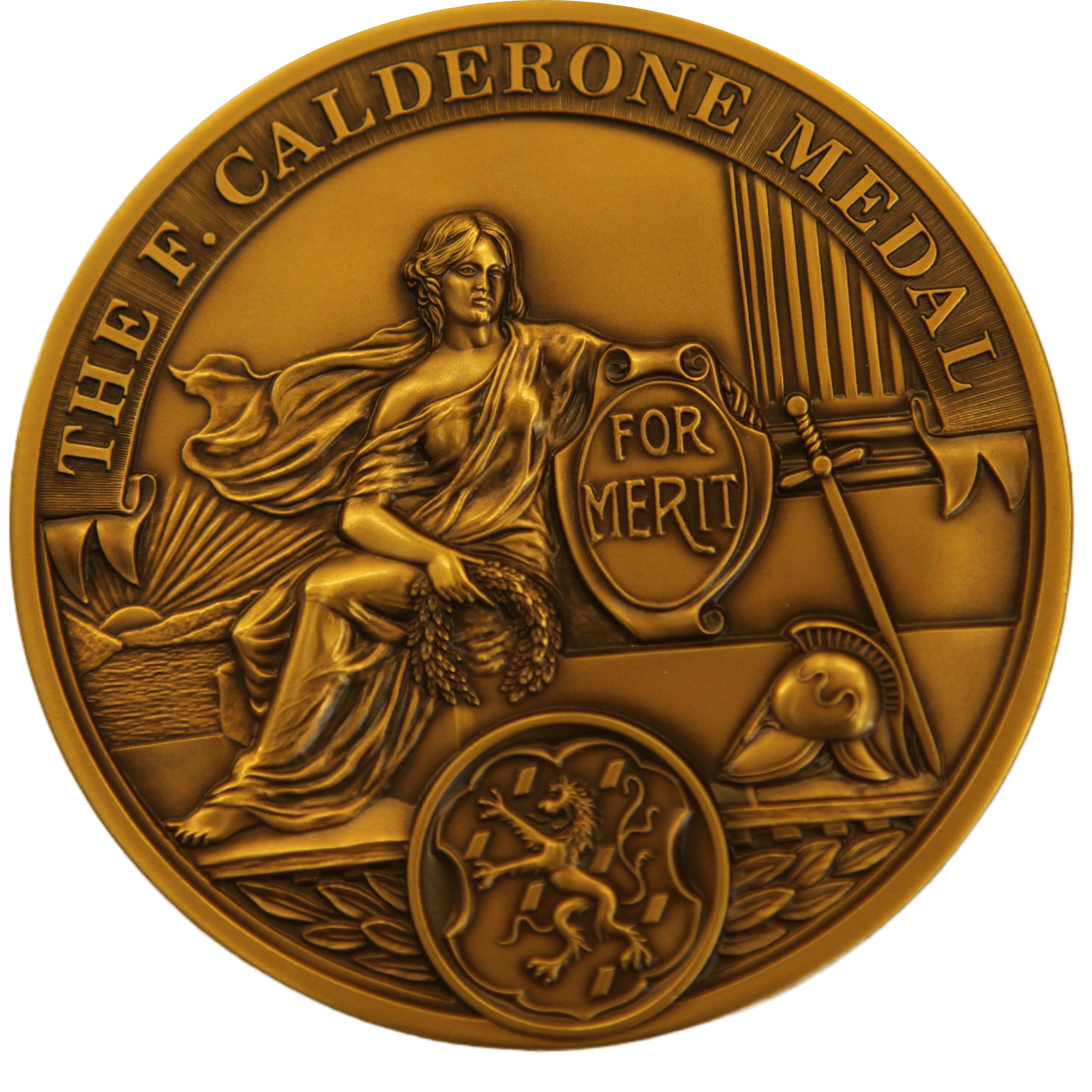
- Obverse side of the Calderone Prize gold medal, designed by Dieges & Clust.
- Awarded for: Outstanding contributions in the field of public health
- Location: New York City, U.S.
- Country: United States
- Presented by: Columbia University Mailman School of Public Health
- Reward: $50,000
- First award: 1992; 34 years ago
- Website: calderoneprize.org

The Frank A. Calderone Prize in Public Health is an award in the field of public health. It is given every two years by the Columbia University Mailman School of Public Health to an individual who has made a "transformational contribution" in the field. The first Calderone Prize was awarded in 1992.

== History ==
Established in 1986, the award is given to an individual who has "accomplished work of extraordinary distinction in the field of public health or made a specific discovery or contribution that has had long-term national or global implications in such areas as communicable disease, environmental health, epidemiology, social and/or behavioral medicine, health policy, or any aspect of health promotion or disease prevention."

The prize is named after Dr. Frank A. Calderone, who after serving as the first deputy health commissioner of New York City from 1943 to 1946, became a leading figure in the World Health Organization (WHO) during its formative years. In 1947, under Dr. Calderone's direction as Medical Administrator at the headquarters of the World Health Organization, the newly-formed organization led a successful global cholera vaccination program. The following year, as the WHO grew to include 58 member countries, Dr. Calderone became the organization's Chief Technical Liaison Officer. He was later appointed as Medical Director of the health service of the United Nations Secretariat, a position which he held from 1951 to 1954.

== Entry and prize consideration ==
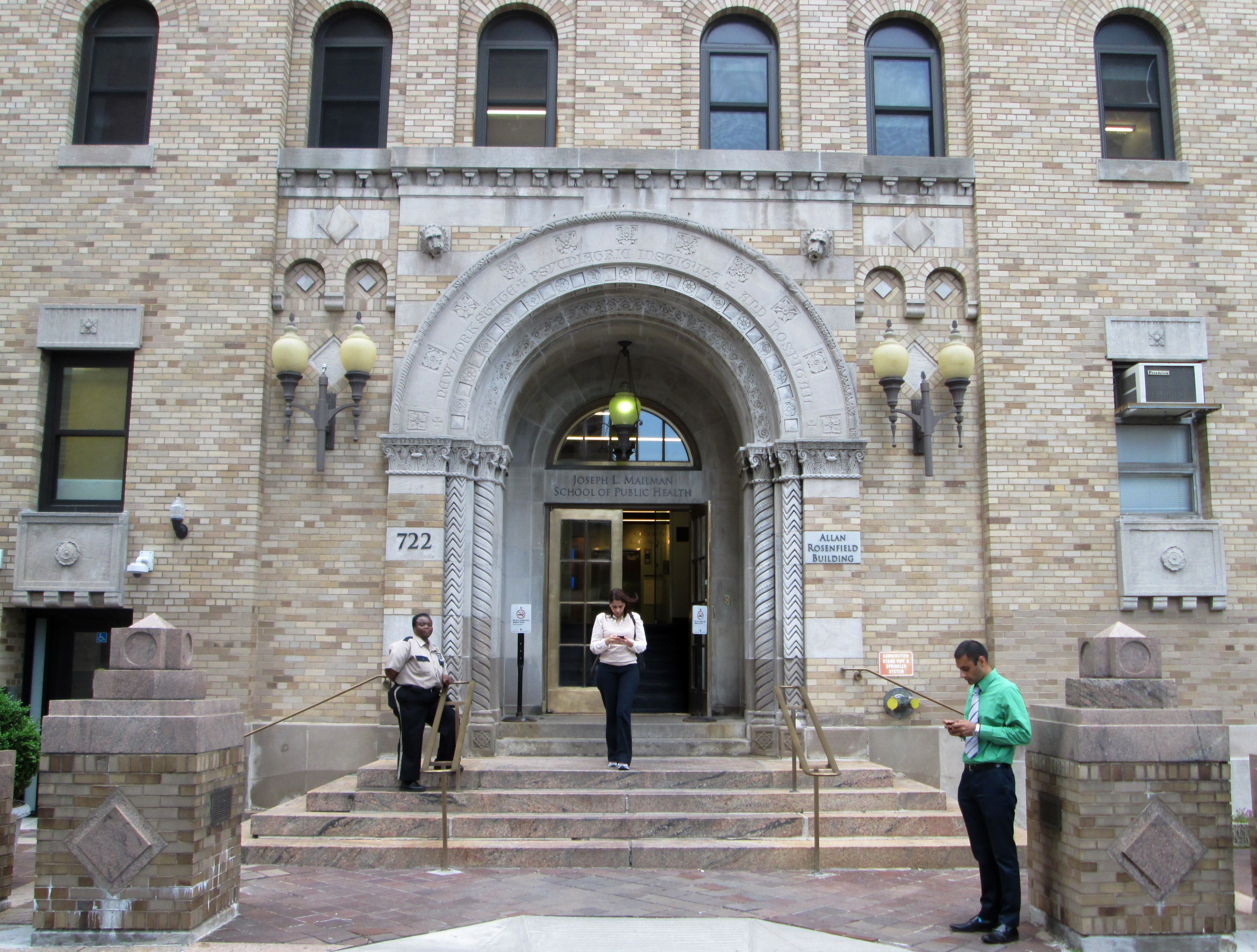
The entrance to the Allan Rosenfield Building at the Columbia University Mailman School of Public Health.

Candidates are nominated for The Frank A. Calderone Prize in Public Health by a select group of public health professionals. The award recipient is then chosen from among all nominees by a nine-member selection committee comprising, but not limited to, the following representatives:

- The current dean of the Mailman School of Public Health at Columbia University (chair of the committee)
- The president, or president-elect, of the Association of Schools of Public Health
- A representative from at least one prominent foundation
- A representative from the Centers for Disease Control and Prevention
- An editor of a prominent public health journal
- A previous prize winner
- A government representative (for example, the Commissioner of Health of the City of New York)
- Two representatives from the Calderone family

== Laureates ==
Source: Columbia University Mailman School of Public Health

Year	Laureate		Country of origin	Background
1992		C. Everett Koop	United States	Surgeon General of the United States; Vice admiral in United States Public Health Service Commissioned Corps; Senior Scholar, the C. Everett Koop Institute, Dartmouth College
1994		Jonathan Mann	United States	Founding Director, Francois-Xavier Bagnoud Center for Health and Human Rights, Harvard University; Administrator for the World Health Organization
1996		William Foege	United States	Senior Fellow, Health Policy at the Carter Center; Director, Centers for Disease Control and Prevention; Senior Medical Advisor, Bill and Melinda Gates Foundation
1999		Donald Henderson	United States	Distinguished Scholar and Professor of Public Health and Medicine, University of Pittsburgh; Dean Emeritus and Professor, Johns Hopkins Bloomberg School of Public Health; Founding Director, Center for Civilian Biodefense Strategies at Johns Hopkins University
2001		Nafis Sadik	Pakistan	Special Advisor to the Secretary-General of the United Nations; Special Envoy for HIV/AIDS in Asia; Executive Director, United Nations Population Fund (UNFPA)
2003		Peter Piot	Belgium	Director, Institute of Global Health at Imperial College London; Executive Director, UNAIDS; Under Secretary-General, United Nations
2005		Mary Robinson	Ireland	President of Ireland; United Nations High Commissioner for Human Rights; Executive Director, Realizing Rights: The Ethical Globalization Initiative
2007		Allan Rosenfield	United States	Dean Emeritus, Columbia University Mailman School of Public Health; National chairman of the Planned Parenthood Federation of America
2010		Susan Pardee Baker	United States	Professor, Johns Hopkins Bloomberg School of Public Health; Founding Director, Johns Hopkins Center for Injury Research and Policy
2011		Harvey V. Fineberg	United States	President of the Gordon and Betty Moore Foundation; Dean of the Harvard School of Public Health; Provost of Harvard University; President of the Institute of Medicine
2014		H. Jack Geiger	United States	Founding member and president of Physicians for Human Rights; Arthur C. Logan Professor Emeritus of Community Medicine, City University of New York Medical School/Sophie Davis School of Biomedical Education
2016		Mary T. Bassett	United States	Commissioner of the New York City Department of Health and Mental Hygiene; Associate professor of clinical epidemiology at the Columbia University Mailman School of Public Health
2018		Julio Frenk	Mexico	President of University of Miami; Secretary of Health of Mexico; Founding director-general of the National Institute of Public Health of Mexico; Executive director of evidence and information for policy at the World Health Organization
2023	Anthony_S._Fauci,_M.D.,_NIAID_Director_(26759498706)	Anthony Fauci	United States	Chief Medical Advisor to the President of the United States; Director of the National Institute of Allergy and Infectious Diseases
2025		Jonathan Samet	United States	Dean of the Colorado School of Public Health; Professor and Chair of the Department of Epidemiology at Johns Hopkins Bloomberg School of Public Health; Chair of the Clean Air Scientific Advisory Committee of the United States Environmental Protection Agency; Chair of the Tobacco Products Scientific Advisory Committee of the Food and Drug Administration
