= Paul Herman Buck =

American historian (1899–1978)

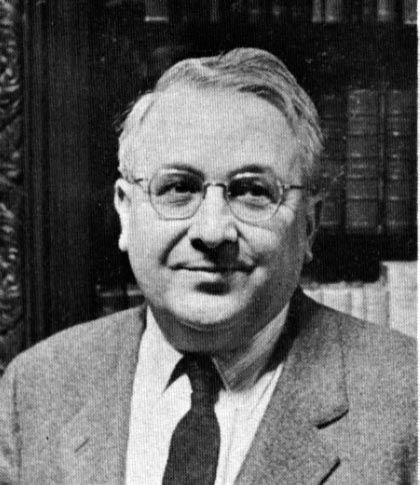
- Buck in 1958

1st Provost of Harvard University
- In office October 15, 1945 – June 1953
- Preceded by: Position established
- Succeeded by: Position abolished until 1992; Jerry Green

Personal details
- Born: August 25, 1899 Columbus, Ohio, U.S.
- Died: December 23, 1978 (aged 79) Cambridge, Massachusetts, U.S.
- Spouse: Sally Betts (m. 1927)
- Education: Ohio State University (BA, MA); Harvard University (MA, PhD)
- Occupation: Historian

Paul Herman Buck (August 25, 1899 – December 23, 1978) was an American historian. He won the Pulitzer Prize for History in 1938 and became the first Provost of Harvard University in 1945.

== Early life and education ==
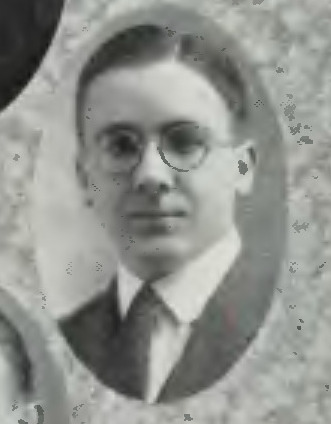
Buck in his 1921 yearbook at Ohio State University

Buck was born in Ohio. He received a bachelor's degree in 1921 and an MA in 1922 from Ohio State University. While an undergraduate, Buck was initiated into the Kappa Sigma fraternity. In 1922 he published his first book Evolution of the National Parks System. He went to Harvard University for his graduate studies, and received a Master's degree in 1924. After studying for one year in Britain and France under a Sheldon traveling fellowship, he joined Harvard as an instructor in history in 1926. He received his PhD from Harvard in 1935.

Buck advised Archibald Cox during his undergraduate years at Harvard College. Cox's senior thesis proposed analyzing the constitutional differences of the composition between the Senate and House of Representatives through early American history, yet Buck bluntly told him he did not "have brains enough" for the project. Cox ended up completing the thesis anyway and graduated with a Bachelor of Arts degree with honors in history in 1934, later becoming the Solicitor General and Special Prosecutor to oversee the Watergate scandal.

== Career ==
In 1936 he became assistant professor of American history at Harvard. While he was a history professor at Harvard, Buck was involved in extensive research which resulted in his study of the Reconstruction era in the American South. Buck won the 1938 Pulitzer Prize for History for The Road to Reunion, 1865-1900 (1937), about the history of politics and government during this era.

He was appointed Associate Dean of Faculty in 1938, Associate Professor in 1939, and Dean of Faculty in 1942 at Harvard. In 1943, while serving as dean, Buck negotiated an agreement that resulted in Harvard taking over the education for students at Radcliffe College.

On October 15, 1945, he became Harvard's first provost, retiring in June 1953 following the resignation of Harvard President James Bryant Conant. While he was provost, Buck headed a faculty committee on general education. The committee's report, titled "General Education in a Free Society," later became the basis for a general education curriculum at Harvard. After Buck's retirement, the position was abolished until Neil Rudenstine appointed Jerry Green to the position in 1992.

In 1955 he became Francis Lee Higginson Professor of History, followed in 1958 by Carl H. Pforzheimer University Professor. In 1955-64 he was director of the university's library. He later published The Role of Education in American History in 1957 and Libraries & Universities: Addresses and Reports in 1964.

== Personal life ==
In 1927, Buck married Sally Betts. Buck died in 1978.

In 1951, Buck received the Legion of Honour.
