= Norman Abrams =

American lawyer

Chancellor of the University of California, Los Angeles
- Acting
- In office July 1, 2006 – July 31, 2007
- Preceded by: Albert Carnesale
- Succeeded by: Gene D. Block

Personal details
- Born: July 7, 1933 (age 92) Chicago, Illinois
- Education: University of Chicago (BA, JD)
- Occupation: Lawyer; University Chancellor; Professor

Norman Abrams (born July 7, 1933) is an American academic, and Professor Emeritus at the UCLA School of Law. He succeeded Albert Carnesale on 30 June 2006 as interim-chancellor of the University of California, Los Angeles until his permanent replacement, Gene D. Block, took office on 1 August 2007.

== Early life and education ==
A native of Chicago, Abrams holds A.B. (1952) and J.D. (1955) degrees from the University of Chicago. While a student, he was editor-in-chief of the University of Chicago Law Review. Before joining the faculty of the University of California, Los Angeles, Abrams served as an associate in law at Columbia University Law School and as a research associate and director of Harvard-Brandeis Cooperative Research for Israel's Legal Development at the Harvard Law School.

== Career ==
=== University of California, Los Angeles ===
Abrams joined the UCLA Law School faculty in 1959. From 1989 to 1991, he served as associate dean. From 1991 to 2001 he served as UCLA's vice chancellor of academic personnel, overseeing faculty appointments and promotions on the campus. He served as interim dean of the law school from 2003 to 2004. On June 15, 2006, Abrams was chosen to become the acting chancellor of UCLA effective July 1, replacing Albert Carnesale.

"UCLA is a very dynamic place, with a lot of forward momentum, and I view my role as keeping it moving forward," Abrams told the Los Angeles Times.[5]

As chancellor, Abrams advocated for more serious penalties to halt harassment of faculty and researchers using laboratory animals. He supported a change to holistic admissions after a drop in African American enrollment.

=== Department of Justice ===
While on leave from UCLA, in 1966–67, Abrams was appointed a special assistant to the Attorney General of the United States, serving in the Criminal Division of the U.S. Department of Justice.

=== Visiting Professor ===
Abrams has taught as a visiting professor at Stanford University Law School, UC Berkeley Law School, the Hebrew University Faculty of Law, Bar-Ilan School of Law, University of Southern California Law School and Loyola University (Los Angeles) School of Law.

== Published work ==
Federal Criminal Law and Its Enforcement / by Norman Abrams, Sara Sun Beale, Susan Riva Klein. 6th ed. St. Paul, Minnesota : West Academic Publishing, ©2015

Anti-terrorism and criminal enforcement / by Norman Abrams. 4th ed., St. Paul, Minnesota : West Academic Publishing, ©2011

Evidence : cases and materials / by Jack B. Weinstein, Norman Abrams, Scott Brewer, Daniel Medwed, 10th ed., Westbury, New York: Foundation Press, ©2017.
