= Albert Carnesale =

American academic administrator (born 1936)

5th Chancellor of the University of California, Los Angeles
- In office 1997–2006
- Preceded by: Charles E. Young
- Succeeded by: Norman Abrams (acting); Gene D. Block

3rd Provost of Harvard University
- In office July 1, 1994 – July 1, 1997
- Preceded by: Jerry Green
- Succeeded by: Harvey Fineberg

Personal details
- Born: July 2, 1936 (age 90)
- Education: Cooper Union (B.M.E.); Drexel University (MEng.); North Carolina State University (PhD)
- Occupation: Mechanical Engineer; University Chancellor

Albert Carnesale (born July 2, 1936) is an American academic and a specialist in arms control and national security. He is a former chancellor of the University of California, Los Angeles, provost of Harvard University, and dean of the Harvard Kennedy School at Harvard University. In addition to his academic career, Carnesale has also been active in international diplomacy on nuclear arms control and nuclear non-proliferation. From 1970 to 1972, he was a member of the U.S. delegation to the Strategic Arms Limitation Talks (SALT I) with the Soviet Union. Carnesale teaches undergraduate and graduate courses at UCLA on topics relating to U.S. national security.

== Early years ==
Carnesale was born on July 2, 1936, in the Bronx, New York. His father was a taxi driver and his mother was an office clerk. He graduated from the Bronx High School of Science. The first person in his family to attend college, he began his university education at the Cooper Union for the Advancement of Science and Art, completing a bachelor's degree in mechanical engineering in 1957. He received a master's degree in mechanical engineering at Drexel University in Philadelphia in 1961 and a PhD in nuclear engineering at North Carolina State University (NCSU) in 1966. While earning his master's degree, Carnesale also worked as a senior engineer at Martin Marietta Corporation.

== Academic career ==
=== North Carolina State University ===
Carnesale served on the nuclear engineering faculty at NCSU from 1962 to 1969 and as professor and head of the Division of University Studies from 1972 to 1974.

=== Harvard University ===
Carnesale became a member of the Harvard faculty in 1974, concentrating on the study of international relations, national security policy, and nuclear arms control. In 1981 he became academic dean of the Harvard Kennedy School. A decade later, Carnesale became dean and was charged with restructuring the school, which faced a budget deficit, and served in that post from 1991 to 1995. At the time of Carnesale's appointment, the Kennedy School faced "a debate over its identity," as tension developed between faculty who were professional scholars and those who were practitioners. Carnesale said the solution lay in finding the right balance and respecting each other's contribution.

==== Provost ====
In 1994, Carnesale was tapped to fill the role of university provost, where he served until 1997. In that position he coordinated the university's central administration and oversaw academic programs that extended beyond Harvard's individual schools. He was key to the university's $2.1 billion capital campaign and efforts to apply information technology to academic and administrative operations. In November 1994, Carnesale was appointed acting president of Harvard while President Rudenstine was on medical leave due to exhaustion. He served in that position for three months.

=== University of California, Los Angeles ===
On July 1, 1997, Carnesale was appointed chancellor of the University of California, Los Angeles, a position he held until June 30, 2006.

Carnesale arrived at UCLA when the UC system was facing soaring costs and sharp budget cuts. He said the university must remain affordable for all Californians. While chancellor, he wrote and spoke about the "public-private gap in higher education," presenting funding models that could potentially enable public institutions to "remain true to the basic values on which they were founded: excellence and access for qualified students, regardless of ability to pay." Throughout his tenure, Carnesale concentrated on attracting research funding and private gifts to sustain UCLA's trajectory toward the top tier of research universities in the face of declining state support. From 1997 to 2005, UCLA's annual operating budget grew from $2.2 billion to $3.5 billion, while the state's portion shrank from 20.7 percent to 15 percent.

When Carnesale was appointed at UCLA, California's Proposition 209 had just gone into effect, forbidding all state institutions from giving preference in admissions based on race or ethnicity. In May 1998, 88 UCLA students were arrested for refusing to leave a building during a 12-hour non-violent protest, demanding that Carnesale defy Prop 209. He replied that while he supported diversity on campus, he could not ignore Prop 209. "I came to this university, knowing that Prop 209 would go into effect on my watch," he said. "I made the decision that it was important to do the best we could within the law, rather than stay at Harvard and not try."

Following the events of September 11, 2001, Carnesale initiated a seminar program named for the university's motto, Fiat Lux, which means "Let there be light." The program of 200 seminars was established to help students understand the events of September 11. The seminars enabled small, interdisciplinary groups of students to explore critical issues with faculty. Carnesale taught a seminar on national security.

As chancellor, Carnesale oversaw the completion of a $3.1 billion fundraising campaign. He also launched the California Nanosystems Institute (CNSI), the Broad Stem Cell Research Institute, the Nazarian Center for Israeli Studies, and the Institute for Society and Genetics. Under his leadership, research funding from competitively awarded grants and contracts doubled, and UCLA formed more than 100 partnerships through Carnesale's "UCLA in L.A." initiative. During this time, the university took major steps toward transformation from a commuter school to a residential campus. From 1997 to 2005, UCLA completed or had under construction new housing for more than 4,600 undergraduate and graduate students. Other additions to the campus included the UCLA Santa Monica Medical Center, Broad Art Center and new buildings for health sciences, physics, engineering, and CNSI. In addition, Glorya Kaufman Hall, Haines Hall, and the Humanities Building were renovated. Construction began on the Ronald Reagan UCLA Medical Center. UCLA Athletics added 23 NCAA titles.

When Carnesale announced that he was stepping down in 2006, he said he had missed teaching and policymaking and that his decision was prompted in part by current events, citing a dearth of people working in national security who had Ph.D.s in fields like nuclear engineering. When he stepped down, he took a year-long sabbatical and then resumed teaching in UCLA's Luskin School of Public Affairs and Henry Samueli School of Engineering and Applied Science. In 2013, a new building in the residential portion of the UCLA campus was named Robin and Albert Carnesale Commons in honor of the chancellor emeritus and his wife. The building houses one of the nation's first health-themed dining halls, as well as a fitness hall and multipurpose space.

== Government career ==
From 1969 to 1972 Carnesale served as chief of the Defensive Weapons Systems Division, Science and Technology Bureau of the U.S. Arms Control and Disarmament Agency in Washington, D.C. From 1970 to 1972, he was a member of the U.S. delegation to the Strategic Arms Limitation Talks (SALT I) with the Soviet Union.

Between 1977 and 1980, he led the U.S. delegation to the International Nuclear Fuel Cycle Evaluation (INFCE). This 66-nation multilateral meeting was intended to investigate and ultimately make recommendations regarding the relationships between civilian and military uses of nuclear energy and materials. In 1980 Carnesale was nominated by President Carter to be chairman of the Nuclear Regulatory Commission. However, Carter's term as president ended before the nomination was brought to a Senate vote. In 1995, President Clinton appointed Carnesale to the Scientific and Policy Advisory Committee of the Arms Control and Disarmament Agency.

In 2009, Carnesale chaired a National Academies committee overseeing efforts to outline "America's Climate Choices" at the request of Congress. In 2010 the U.S. Department of Energy appointed Carnesale to a high-level national commission on nuclear waste production, the 15-person Blue Ribbon Commission on America's Nuclear Future. In 2014, he was appointed to the U.S. Secretary of Energy's Advisory Board. He also chaired the National Academies Committees on NASA's Strategic Direction, on Nuclear Forensics and on the U.S. Conventional Prompt Global Strike. He is a member of the Council on Foreign Relations and the Pacific Council on International Policy.

== Honors ==
Carnesale was elected a Fellow of the American Academy of Arts and Sciences in 1996 and a Fellow of the American Association for the Advancement of Science in 2008. In 2011 he received the Harvard Medal for service to the university. Also in 2011, he was elected to the Nation Academy of Engineering "for bringing engineering excellence and objectivity to international security and arms control, and for leadership in higher education." In 1997, he received an honorary doctor of letters degree from NCSU. He also holds honorary degrees from Harvard University (A.M.), New Jersey Institute of Technology (Sc.D.), Drexel University (LL.D.) and Pardee RAND Graduate School (D.P.P). In 1985, he received the Gano Dunn Award for Outstanding Professional Achievement from the Cooper Union.

== Selected works ==
- Carnesale, Albert; Doty, Paul; Hoffman, Stanley; Huntington, Samuel P.; Nye, Joseph S.; Sagan, Scott D. (1983), Living with Nuclear Weapons, Harvard University Press and Bantam Books, ISBN 978-0674536654
- Carnesale, Albert; Allison, Graham T; Nye, Joseph S. Jr. (1985), Hawks, Doves, and Owls: An Agenda for Avoiding Nuclear War, W.W. Norton, ISBN 978-0393019957
- Carnesale, Albert; Haass, Richard N. (1987), Superpower Arms Control: Setting the Record Straight, Ballinger Publishing Company, ISBN 978-0887302299
- Carnesale, Albert; Allison, Graham T., Nye, Joseph S., Jr. (1988), Fateful Visions: Avoiding Nuclear Catastrophe, Ballinger Publishing Company, ISBN 978-0887302725
- Carnesale, Albert; Blackwill, Robert D. (1993), New Nuclear Nations: Consequences for U.S. Policy, Council on Foreign Relations ISBN 978-0876091531
- Carnesale is also the author of more than 50 scholarly articles.
