= Microeconomic Theory (textbook) =

1995 textbook

- Author: Andreu Mas-Colell; Michael D. Whinston; Jerry R. Green
- Language: English
- Subject: Microeconomics
- Genre: Non-fiction
- Publisher: Oxford University Press
- Publication date: 1995

Microeconomic Theory by Andreu Mas-Colell, Michael D. Whinston, and Jerry R. Green is the standard US graduate level microeconomics textbook.

First published in 1995, the book consists of five parts: Part I: Individual Decision-Making; Part II: Game Theory; Part III: Market Equilibrium and Market Failure; Part IV: General Equilibrium; Part V: Welfare Economics and Incentives. The book provides a rigorous (mathematical) and lengthy (nearly 1000 pages) treatment of the standard microeconomic theorems and their proofs.

The book became the standard textbook soon after its 1995 publication. And, over 25 years later, it is still widely used.

== Editions ==
- Mas-Colell, Andreu. Michael D. Whinston and Jerry R. Green. (1995) Microeconomic Theory, Oxford University Press, Oxford. 1995. 981

== Publisher's page ==
- Oxford University Press's page on Microeconomic Theory.
