= Roberto Serrano =

Spanish–American economist (born 1964)

- Born: October 26, 1964 (age 61); Madrid, Spain

Academic background
- Education: Complutense University of Madrid; Harvard University

Roberto Serrano (born 1964) is a Spanish-American economist. He is the Harrison S. Kravis University Professor of Economics at Brown University. Serrano is a fellow of the Econometric Society and a former Member of the Council of the Game Theory Society.

== Career ==
Serrano is the Harrison S. Kravis University Professor of Economics at Brown University. He is known for his work in game theory and serves as an editor at Games and Economic Behavior.

In 2026, after nine Brown students were injured in the 2025 Brown University shooting, including two of his students, Serrano changed the midterm exam for ECON 1170 to be a take-home, closed-book exam. The class scored an average of 96, rather than the historical average of between 65 and 80. Combined with other signs of AI usage, Serrano changed the final exam to be in person. After 30% of the class did not show up and the class scored an average of 48, he ultimately voided the midterm, saying that "humanity has chosen to become idiots". The incident led to widespread debate over the role of artificial intelligence in academics and education, while Serrano himself criticized Brown University's administration for not doing enough to prevent cheating.

== Personal life ==
Roberto Serrano was born in Madrid, Spain on October 26, 1964. He earned a Bachelor of Arts in economics from the Complutense University of Madrid in 1987 and an M.A. and Ph.D. in economics from Harvard University in 1990 and 1992, respectively.

Serrano has been blind since 17.
