= Jerry Green (economist) =

American economist

2nd Provost of Harvard University
- In office July 1, 1992 – July 1, 1994
- Preceded by: Paul Buck
- Succeeded by: Albert Carnesale

Personal details
- Born: December 15, 1946 (age 79) New York City, New York
- Education: University of Rochester (AB, MA, PhD)

Academic background
- Doctoral advisor: Lionel W. McKenzie

Academic work
- Discipline: Economics
- Institutions: Harvard University
- Website: Information at IDEAS / RePEc

Jerry Richard Green (born December 15, 1946) is the John Leverett Professor in the University and the David A. Wells Professor of Political Economy at Harvard University. He is known for his research in economic theory, as well as writing the most commonly used microeconomic theory for graduate school with Andreu Mas-Colell and Michael Whinston, Microeconomic Theory.

== Education ==
Green received his bachelor's degree from the University of Rochester in 1967 and his Ph.D. in economics in 1970.

== Career ==
He then joined Harvard's economics faculty, chairing the department from 1984 to 1987. In 1992, then-Harvard president Neil Rudenstine appointed Green to be the university's provost, re-establishing the position after it was abolished after the retirement of Paul Buck in 1953. Green resigned as provost in 1994 and was succeeded by Albert Carnesale.

He is a Senior Fellow at the Harvard Society of Fellows and a fellow of the Econometric Society. He was elected fellow of the American Academy of Arts and Sciences in 1994 and fellow of the Society for the Advancement of Economic Theory in 2012.
