= International health =

Health care across national boundaries

International health, also called geographic medicine, international medicine, or global health, is a field of health care, usually with a public health emphasis, dealing with health across regional or national boundaries. One subset of international medicine, travel medicine, prepares travelers with immunizations, prophylactic medications, preventive techniques such as bed nets and residual pesticides, in-transit care, and post-travel care for exotic illnesses. International health, however, more often refers to health personnel or organizations from one area or nation providing direct health care, or health sector development, in another area or nation. It is this sense of the term that is explained here. More recently, public health experts have become interested in global processes that impact human health. Globalisation and health, for example, illustrate the complex and changing sociological environment within which the determinants of health and disease express themselves.

== International health governance ==
The World Health Organization (WHO) is the international body primarily responsible for regulating and governing health-related policies and practices across nations. While the WHO uses various policies and treaties to address international health issues, many of their policies have no binding power and thus state compliance is often limited. As a result, a Framework Convention on Global Health (FCGH) has recently been proposed as a global health treaty that would use stronger domestic accountability mechanisms (including incentives & sanctions) in order to close national and global health inequities. However, some scholars have addressed concerns regarding the FCGH, arguing that it would duplicate other global health governance efforts, lack feasibility, and have limited impact in regulating global health.

== The role of academic institutions ==
Timothy D. Baker was the founder of the first academic department of international health in the United States at the Johns Hopkins Bloomberg School of Public Health in 1959.

== The role of NGOs ==
Much work in international health is performed by non-governmental organizations (NGOs). Services provided by international health NGOs include direct health care, community potable water, vitamin supplementation, and mitigation of endemic and epidemic infectious diseases and malnutrition. Examples of NGOs dedicated to international health include:

- Pakistan Heart Foundation
- CARE
- Médecins Sans Frontières (Doctors Without Borders)
- The International Committee of the Red Cross
- International Medical Corps
- Oxfam
- Partners in Health
- Project HOPE
- Save the Children

NGOs often collaborate the United Nations, with over 6,000 having consultative status with the UN's Economic and Social Council (ECOSOC). This status grants them both responsibilities and benefits, enabling them to contribute to global efforts, particularly in areas like international health.

=== In harm's way ===
These organizations often go in harm's way to provide services to people affected by natural disaster or conflict. For example, Médecins Sans Frontières has lost members in the Darfur area, and Care International's Iraq Director, Margaret Hassan (a long-time Iraq resident with dual Iraqi-British citizenship) was brutally murdered on the Internet by Al Qaeda-affiliated terrorists for the "crime" of providing services equitably among Iraqis. International Medical Corps was begun in response to the suffering of the Afghan people after the Soviet invasion of 1979, and is adept at providing services in dangerous places.

== The role of international health NGOs in international development ==
Health-related NGOs also provide capacity development in areas of need; that is, helping nations develop sustainable domestic health solutions through training programs. An example of this type of aid is the Center for International Rehabilitation, which has provided rehabilitation training for Iraqi physical therapists, physicians, and rehabilitation clinic managers in Tuzla, Bosnia and Amman, Jordan. These trainees then care for amputees, spinal and head injury patients in their home country.

Many international health NGOs operate in consultative status with the United Nations, allowing them to collaborate directly with UN bodies and the World Health Organization (WHO) to address global health challenges. For example, the International Federation of Red Cross and Red Crescent Societies (IFRC) partners with the UN to provide emergency health services, especially during crises such as the COVID-19 pandemic. The pandemic highlighted the critical role of international health organizations, with entities like the WHO coordinating global responses, including vaccine distribution through the COVAX initiative. In addition, prominent organizations like the Bill & Melinda Gates Foundation work closely with UN-affiliated agencies, focusing on health innovation, such as developing affordable vaccines and strengthening healthcare systems. The Gates Foundation has also partnered with U.S.-based institutions like the Centers for Disease Control and Prevention (CDC) to tackle diseases like malaria and HIV/AIDS, demonstrating a strong connection between international health efforts and U.S. policy priorities. These partnerships underscore the importance of a coordinated global response in achieving sustainable health outcomes, particularly in times of crisis.

=== Medical NGOs vs. other national health systems ===
NGOs often complement national healthcare systems by addressing gaps that government-run programs cannot adequately fill, particularly in low-resource settings. National systems, constrained by budget limitations, bureaucratic inefficiencies, or geographic inaccessibility, may fail to provide equitable healthcare access to marginalized populations. NGOs, operating with more flexibility, can bridge these gaps by delivering targeted services in areas of critical need, such as rural regions or underserved urban communities. For example, NGOs frequently focus on areas like maternal health, infectious disease prevention, and emergency response where national systems may be lacking.

Unlike national systems, which are often subject to political priorities or limited by systemic inefficiencies, NGOs can mobilize international funding, deploy innovative solutions, and adapt their approaches to the specific needs of local populations. This role became especially evident during the COVID-19 pandemic, where NGOs partnered with governments to distribute vaccines, provide community education, and support overwhelmed healthcare facilities. However, while NGOs play a vital role in strengthening healthcare systems, their efforts are not a replacement for sustainable government action. Excessive reliance on NGOs can sometimes undermine national systems by creating parallel structures that draw resources and skilled personnel away from the public sector. A cooperation between sectors is vital to the continuing effort of achieving health equity.

=== NGOs vs. missionaries ===
One important characteristic of NGO work is that, in the "pure" sense, they provide services based solely upon need, without political, ethnic, religious, or other considerations. Thus, strictly speaking, religious missionary organizations that perform services as part of a proselytizing or evangelical campaign should be separated from the NGO category and simply be referred to as religious missionary organizations. Some religious relief organizations do provide services more as a duty or "charity", however, without requirements for the recipients to attend any preaching, prayer or other religious preconditions.

== Harnessing the power of technology ==
As NGO practice evolves parallel with technology, NGOs have developed more scientific and precise methods of assessment, planning and operations in humanitarian assistance and complex emergencies. One example is the Sphere Project's Humanitarian Charter and Minimum Standards in Disaster Response. They have taken other new tools into the planning offices and field: in addition to the obligatory laptop computer, they typically rely heavily upon cellular and satellite communications, the Internet, and geographic information services, or GIS. These technological improvements allow them to better focus efforts in areas of need, respond to evolving crises, and predict future needs. Indeed, in a related effort, the United States Holocaust Museum teamed with Google Earth to establish baseline GIS photos of crisis-torn Darfur, updating them at intervals, and uploading them to the Internet for public access. Since Internet "surfers" can browse these images and see where once-present villages are later obliterated, this teamwork gave lie to the Sudanese claim that it was engaging in neither ethnic cleansing nor genocide.

== American efforts in international health ==
=== The U.S. Department of Defense ===
In another teamwork effort, the Assistant Secretary of Defense (Health Affairs) of the United States Department of Defense, as the DoD's senior medical officer, established the International Health Division in late 2007 to help coordinate military health doctrine and practices in international development. The International Health Division places great emphasis upon working with NGOs to provide sustainable, culturally-appropriate development activities around the world. While critics maintain that DoD does not provide aid equitably and without regard to political influence, the Asian tsunami of December, 2004 (due to the 2004 Indian Ocean earthquake) demonstrated that DoD was capable of working in a supporting role without regard to geopolitical gain. Indeed, the DoD was surprised at the unexpected degree of improvement in American prestige as a result of its role in Southeast Asia and months later, in the Pakistan earthquake. A similar event resulted in rapid mobilization of DoD resources in response to the 2007 Peru earthquake, Bangladeshi Typhoon Sidr and Tropical Storm Nero in the Dominican Republic, all in the last half of 2007, with no reasonable expectation of material gain for America.

In 2005, then-Secretary of Defense Donald Rumsfeld signed DoD Directive 3000.05, "Stability, Security, Transition and Reconstruction Operations". This document requires the DoD to assign Stability, Security, Transition and Reconstruction (SSTR) the same importance in planning and preparation as it gives to war.

The rationale for SSTR is intuitive: stability promotes rule of law and economic development. These provide the base for essential services such as education, public health and sanitation, law enforcement and fire suppression. Essential services, in turn, lead to increased stability and economic opportunity. Health in the general population, and in particular the labor force, is essential to productivity and consequent stability.

Although these relationships are not necessarily linear, and there is no inherent guarantee of equitable distribution of wealth in a developing society, full employment and hope for the future may be powerful disincentives to conflict. In this way, the DoD, through SSTR operations, expects to prevent some potential conflicts and criminal activities.

The International Health Division, charged with policy implications of DoDD 3000.05, is located within the Office of the ASD(HA), reporting through Force Health Protection & Readiness. International Health develops DoD's policy on medical ethics and the practice of medicine in international health and development settings. International Health also identifies needs in developing nations and looks for non-governmental organizations (NGOs), intergovernmental organizations, and private voluntary organizations (PVOs) such as professional societies, that have the ability and expertise to address these problems. In this way, the NGOs develop helping relationships with the nations or regions they work in, fostering stability and sustainability.

Other DoD international health activities occurring on a regular basis include medical civic action projects (MEDCAPs), in which Army, Navy or Air Force medical assets provide direct care, sanitation, and other public health services to host nation (HN) locals. Such MEDCAPs are generally traced to the Vietnam War, when medical units and medical personnel assigned to combat units would organize field medical care to Vietnamese, Hmong and others. There is a growing realization among the military that MEDCAP care may not be the best model, if the result is merely handing out antibiotics for upper respiratory infections and anti-inflammatories for aches and pains. However, projects such as de-worming, dentistry, prenatal education and care, and veterinary care, when performed in conjunction with HN health authorities and the local health infrastructure, have indisputable and long-lasting benefits to the recipients.

Similar to MEDCAPs, the military performs Medical Readiness Training Exercises (MEDRETEs), Joint Combined Exchange Training (JCET), and Humanitarian-Civic Action (HCA) exercises, all of which may have direct and indirect services as a feature of the training.

Finally, the military has unparalleled logistical and lift capabilities to respond to humanitarian assistance/disaster response(HADR) needs.

In conjunction with the Uniformed Services University of the Health Sciences (USUHS), the Center for Disaster and Humanitarian Medicine (CDHAM) develops curriculum, teaches disaster and humanitarian assistance principles to graduate, medical, and post-doctoral students and publishes courses on incident command and other related topics. The handbook on military-NGO relations, "A Guide to Non-Governmental Organizations for the Military" is available free on-line.
