= John E. Dowling =

American biologist

- Born: Pawtucket, Rhode Island
- Education: Harvard University (B.S., PhD)
- Known for: foundations of vertebrate retina biology, vitamin A deficiency, and retinal degeneration
- Spouse: Judith Dowling
- Children: Christopher, Nicholas, Alexandra
- Scientific career
- Fields: Molecular neuroscience; Ophthalmology
- Workplaces: Harvard University; Johns Hopkins University; Marine Biological Laboratory
- Doctoral advisor: George Wald

John E. Dowling is an American neuroscientist and Gordon and Llura Gund Research Professor of Neurosciences Emeritus at Harvard University. He is best known for his work in vision science, including studies on the structure, electrophysiology and pharmacology of the vertebrate retina, as well as on retinal degenerations caused by vitamin A deficiency and gene mutations. He was elected to the American Academy of Arts and Sciences in 1972, the National Academy of Sciences in 1976, and the American Philosophical Society in 1992.

== Education ==
Dowling earned his Ph.D. at Harvard University under the direction of George Wald. He also received a bachelor's degree at Harvard and attended Harvard Medical School.

== Career ==
In 1961, Dowling became an instructor of the Department of Biology at Harvard University. From 1961 to 1964 he was assistant professor of biology at Harvard. Upon completion, he was assistant professor of ophthalmology at Johns Hopkins University from 1964 to 1966 and associate professor of ophthalmology and biophysics from 1966 to 1971. From 1961 to 1971 and 1991 he was a lecturer of the Lancaster Course in Ophthalmology, co-director of a neurobiology course, Marine Biological Laboratory (1970-1974 and 1998), professor of biology at Harvard University (1971-1987), chairman of the Department of Biology at Harvard University (1975-1978), overseas fellow of Churchill College, Cambridge, England (1978-1979), acting master of North House, Harvard University (1979-1980), associate dean of the Faculty of Arts and Sciences, Harvard University (1980-1984), master of Leverett House, Harvard University (1981-1998).

Dowling has served as an associate editor for Cellular Neurobiology, Journal of Neuroscience (1989–1994), Council of Society of Neuroscience Member (1980-1984), governing board of National Research Council member (1985-1988 and 1994-1997), Commission on Life Sciences National Research Council chairman (1985-1988), scientific advisory board member of the Whitney Marine Laboratory (1986-1991), executive committee member of the Marine Biology Laboratory (1974-1976 and 1988-1990), council member of the National Eye Institute (1986-1990), medical advisory board member of the Howard Hughes Medical Institute (1989-1992), Association for Research in Vision and Ophthalmology trustee (1991-1998), FASEB Summer Conference on Biology, Chemistry and Modeling Vision chairman, (1992), Council of Faculty of Arts and Sciences member, Harvard University (1993-1995), National Academy of Sciences member (1993-1996), and president of the Association for Research in Vision and Ophthalmology (1996-1997).

Dowling was a trustee of the Massachusetts Eye and Ear Infirmary (1986-2024), a member on the scientific advisory board of the Foundation for Fighting Blindness (1971–1985), member of the scientific advisory board of Research to Prevent Blindness (1991–2010), member of the scientific advisory board of the Knights Templar Research Foundation (1991–1995), member of the scientific advisory board of the McLean Hospital, member of the educational advisory board of the John S. Guggenheim Memorial Foundation (1991–1995), member of the scientific advisory board of the Center for Neural Science, New York University, member of the board of directors of the Harvard University Press (1997–2017), and president of the Corporation of Marine Biological Laboratory (1998–2008).

== Awards ==
Dowling was awarded the Friedenwald Medal by the Association for Research in Vision and Ophthalmology in 1970. He was elected to the National Academy of Sciences in 1976. In 1978, he was awarded a Guggenheim Fellowship.

Dowling received an honorary MD from Lund University in 1982. Subsequently, he was awarded an Alcon Research Institute Award in 1986; the American Academy of Optometry Prentice Medal in 1991; and the ARVO Von Sallman Prize in 1992. He was the New England Ophthalmological Society's Taylor Smith Orator in 1993.

== Bibliography ==
=== Books ===
- Dowling, J. E. "The Retina: An Approachable Part of the Brain, "Harvard University Press, Cambridge, MA (1987); revised edition (2012).
- Dowling, J.E. "Neurons and Networks: An Introduction to Neuroscience," Harvard University Press, Cambridge, MA (1992); 2nd edition (2001).
- Dowling, J.E. "Creating Mind: How the Brain Works, "W. W. Norton & Co., New York, NY (1998).
- Dowling, J.E. “The Great Brain Debate: Nature or Nurture?”, Joseph Henry Press, National Academy of Sciences, Washington D.C. (2004); paperback edition, Princeton University Press Princeton N.J. (2007).
- Dowling, J.E. and Dowling, J.L. “Vision: How it Works and What Can Go Wrong”. MIT Press, Cambridge, MA (2016).
- Dowling, J.E. "Understanding the Brain: From Cells to Behavior to Cognition", W. W. Norton & Co., New York. NY (2018).

=== Edited volumes ===
- Shipley, T. and Dowling, J.E. (eds.), "Visual Processes in Vertebrates, "Vision Research Supplement, Volume 11, Pergamon Press, Oxford (1971)
- Landers, M.B., Wolbarsht, J. L., Dowling, J.E. and Laties, A.M. (eds.) "Retinitis Pigmentosa: Clinical Implications of Current Research, "Plenum Press, New York (1977)
- Poppel, E., Held, R., and Dowling, J.E. (eds.) "Neuronal Mechanisms in Visual Perceptions," Neuroscience Research Program Bulletin, Volume 15, M.I.T. Press, Cambridge, MA (1977)
- Cone, R.A. and Dowling, J.E. (eds.): "Membrane Transduction Mechanisms, "Society of General Physiologists, Raven Press, New York (1979)
- Dowling, J.E., Proenza, L.M. and Atwell, C.W. (eds.): "Nutrition Pharmacology and Vision" Proceedings of a Symposium sponsored by the Committee on Vision of the National Research Council of Retina, Volume 2, pp. 231–380 (1982)
- Dowling, J.E., Kolb, H., Miller, R. and Tomita, T. (eds.): "Retinal Neurocircuitry with Special Reference to Synaptic Transmission, "Proceedings of the 4th Taniguchi International Symposium on Visual Science, Vision Research, Volume 23, Pergamon Press, Oxford (1983)
- Dowling, J.E., Kolb, H. and Waessle, H. (eds.): "Proceedings of the Brian Boycott Festschrift, "Visual Neuroscience, Volume 7 No. 1/2, Cambridge University Press, Cambridge, England (1991)
- Barlow, R., Dowling, J.E. and Weissmann, G. (eds.): "The Biological Century," Harvard University Press (1992)
