= Ralph Kuncl =

American neurologist

Ralph W. Kuncl

11th President of the University of Redlands
- In office August 2012 – June 2021
- Preceded by: James R. Appleton
- Succeeded by: Krista L. Newkirk

Personal details
- Spouse: Nancy Kuncl
- Education: Occidental College; University of Chicago
- Profession: Academic

Ralph W. Kuncl is an American neurologist and president emeritus of the University of Redlands.

His previous administrative positions include as provost/executive vice president at the University of Rochester and provost at Bryn Mawr College. The majority of his early career was spent at the Johns Hopkins School of Medicine, where he served as professor of neurology, pathology, and cellular and molecular medicine and became known for his research on the disease mechanisms of muscle disorders and amyotrophic lateral sclerosis (ALS).

Kuncl is a graduate of Occidental College (magna cum laude, Phi Beta Kappa) and earned a Ph.D. and M.D. from the University of Chicago.
