= Timeline of global health =

This page is a timeline of global health, including major conferences, interventions, cures, and crises.

== Big picture ==
=== Late 1700s–1930s (pre-WWII era) ===
During this pre-WWII era, there are three big trends that operate separately, but sometimes affect each other in development and outcomes.

First, a trend of urbanization (fueled by the Industrial Revolution) as well as greater global trade and migration leads to new challenges, including those in urban sanitation and infectious diseases/pandemics. Six global cholera pandemics happen in this period because of increased commerce and migration.

Second, there is a lot of development on the underlying theory of disease, advancements in vaccine and antibiotic development, and a variety of experimental large-scale eradication and control programs. One big example: the germ theory of diseases begins to become accepted and popularized starting around 1850. Another big example is the development of the smallpox vaccine by Edward Jenner in 1796. Systematic eradication and control efforts include the Rockefeller Sanitary Commission and efforts to eradicate smallpox. Antitoxins and vaccines for numerous diseases including cholera and tuberculosis are developed during this period, building on a trend of greater understanding of and control over microorganisms.

A third theme during this era is the formation of various preliminary international alliances and conferences, including the International Sanitary Conferences, Pan American Health Organization, Office International d'Hygiène Publique, and the League of Nations Health Committee. This is closely intertwined with the other two trends. For instance, the cholera pandemics mentioned above, as well as the growing scientific understanding of the germ theory of disease, are both key impetuses for the International Sanitary Conferences.

=== 1940s–early 1960s (post-WWII era) ===
Following the end of World War II, the first batch of big organizations, both international and national (with international cooperation), including the United Nations and World Health Organization (WHO), form. Beginning with the United Nations Relief and Rehabilitation Administration for relief of victims of war in 1943, there is a big push to begin creating large scale health initiatives, non-governmental organizations, and worldwide global health programs by the United Nations to improve quality of life around the world. UNICEF, the World Health Organization, as well as the UNRRA are all part of United Nations efforts to benefit global health beginning with developing countries. These various programs aim to aid in economic endeavors by providing loans, direct disease prevention programs, health education, etc.

=== Late 1960s–1970s ===
After wrapping up complications caused by the end of the war, there is international energy put into eradication, beginning with the complete smallpox eradication in 1979. There is greater dissatisfaction with WHO for its focus on disease/infection control at the expense of trying to improve general living conditions, as well as disappointment at its low budget and staffing. This atmosphere spurs other organizations to provide their own forms of aid. The Alma Ata Declaration and selective primary healthcare are created to express urgent action by all governments and citizens to protect and promote the health of all people equally. More organizations form following these new active attitudes toward global health, including the International Agency for Research on Cancer and the Doctors Without Borders organization. Publications like the WHO Model List of Essential Medicines highlight basic medicines required by most adults and children to survive, and set priorities for healthcare fund allocation in developing countries. Generally, there is more buy-in for the idea that direct, targeted efforts to address healthcare could be worthwhile and benefit many countries.

=== 1980s–2000 ===
Certain specific efforts increase in efficiency and productivity, including improvement in maternal and child health and a focus on HIV/AIDS, tuberculosis, and malaria (the 'Big Three') in developing countries. During this time period, the child survival revolution (CSR), which helps reduce child mortality in the developing world, and GOBI-FFF are both advocated by James P. Grant. The World Summit for Children also takes place, becoming one of the largest ever gathering of heads of states and government to commit a set of goals to improve the well-being of children. Finally, HIV/AIDS becomes the focus of many governmental and non-governmental organizations, leading to the formation of the Global Programme on AIDS (GPA) by efforts of the World Health Organization. However, these health organizations also make significant advancements to tuberculosis treatments, including the DOTS strategy and the formation of the Stop TB Partnership.

=== 2000s and beyond ===
UN's Millennium Development Goals establishes health care as an important goal (not just combating infectious diseases). Later in 2015, the Sustainable Development Goals build on the MDGs to outline the objectives that will transform our world by ending poverty, helping the environment, and improving health and education. More specific disease-targeting organizations are created primarily to fund healthcare plans in developing countries, including the President's Emergency Plan for AIDS Relief and The Global Fund to Fight AIDS, Tuberculosis and Malaria. These organizations (especially the WHO) adopt new strategies and initiatives, including the 3 by 5 Initiative to widen the access to antiretroviral treatment, the WHO Framework Convention on Tobacco Control, etc. Private large donors such as the Bill & Melinda Gates Foundation begin to play an important role in shaping the funding landscape and direction of efforts in global health. Following the adoption of Sustainability Development Goals in 2015 , UHC became a major global health objective , promoting access to essential health services without financial hardship.

The COVID-19 pandemic, which began in 2019, highlighted global health inequalities and strengthened international efforts in disease surveillance, emergency preparedness, and vaccine distribution. In response to the pandemic, countries and the WHO increased efforts to improve global pandemic preparedness through international cooperation and new health security initiatives.

== Full timeline ==
=== Inclusion criteria ===
The following events are selected for inclusion in the timeline:

- Major medical advances, such as the first vaccines or antibiotics for important diseases.
- Major disease outbreaks, particularly those that played a key role in identifying key medical facts about the nature of disease or epidemiology.
- Key programs, innovations, and strategies in delivery of treatments and healthcare supply chains.
- Government policies or healthcare systems that are the first of their kind in the world, or have global significance for some other reason.
- The forming of trans-national organizations and private foundations that either directly deal with global health, or fund and manage other organizations that do. Note that we also include some emergency medical relief organizations, because they have played an important role in identifying and combating disease outbreaks in the aftermath of natural or man-made disaster.
- Important conferences related to global health. For conferences held regularly, we only include an event for the first time the conference was held, or if there was a particularly influential conference.

We do not include:

- Incremental advances in medical science except the most important ones.
- Rollouts of policies by different governments, or changes to local healthcare structures, except those that are pioneering. To understand healthcare at the country level, you can see the timelines of healthcare by country.
- Incremental changes to existing trans-national organizations or private foundations in their global health programs, except those that have significance as pioneering new approaches to global health.

=== Timeline ===
Year	Event type	Event	Disease name	Geographic location
1747	Medical advancement	The first reported clinical trial is conducted by James Lind in 1747 to identify treatment for scurvy.	Scurvy	
1796	Discovery	The smallpox vaccine is the first successful vaccine to be developed, introduced by scientist Edward Jenner. He observes that milkmaids who previously caught cowpox did not later catch smallpox by showing that the inoculated cowpox protected against inoculated smallpox.	Smallpox	
1813	Policy	The Vaccine Act of 1813 is an Act of the Twelfth Congress of the United States to encourage vaccination against smallpox. The Act is the first federal law concerning consumer protection and pharmaceuticals. The authority to regulate vaccines is given to the states after the Act is repealed in May 1822.	Smallpox	United States
1817–1824	Crisis	The first cholera pandemic begins near Calcutta, reaching most of Asia. It killed over 100,000 people.	Cholera	India, Thailand, Philippines, Java, Oman, China, Japan, Persian Gulf, Iraq, Syria, Transcaucasia, Astrakhan (Russia), Zanzibar, and Mauritius.
1829–1851	Crisis	The second cholera pandemic, known as the Asiatic Cholera Pandemic, probably starts along the Ganges river. It is the first to reach Europe and North America. Like in the first one, fatalities reach six figures.	Cholera	India, western and eastern Asia, Europe, Americas.
1847	Crisis	The 1847 North American typhus epidemic occurs. The outbreak of epidemic typhus is caused by a massive Irish emigration in 1847, during the Great Famine, aboard crowded and disease-ridden "coffin ships".	Typhus	Canada, United States
1851	Discovery	Theodor Bilharz discovers the parasite responsible for schistosomiasis. During an autopsy, he discovered the trematode worm that is the main cause of urinary schistosomiasis, which is a disease caused by parasitic flatworms called schistosomes. It is also known as snail fever.	Schistosomiasis	
1851	Organization	The first of the International Sanitary Conferences is held in Paris. The French government organizes it to help stop the spread of yellow fever, cholera, and plague. Twelve countries participate, with each participating country sending a physician and a diplomat as representatives.		France
1854	Crisis	Severe Broad Street cholera outbreak occurs in the Soho district of London, England. It proves to be central to the development of modern epidemiology.	Cholera	England
1855	Crisis	Third plague pandemic begins in the Yunnan province of China and spreads beyond the country in the aftermath of the Panthay Rebellion. This bubonic plague pandemic spreads to all inhabited continents and kills 12 million people.	Bubonic plague	China (origin)
1863	Organization	International Committee of the Red Cross, a private humanitarian institution, is founded by Henry Dunant and Gustave Moynier. Based in Geneva, Switzerland, it starts as a committee of five and goes on to be very influential and win three Nobel Peace Prizes. The Red Cross plays a key role in providing emergency medical relief in war-torn areas, and its work helps contains the spread of infectious disease in these environments.		Switzerland (Geneva)
1880	Discovery	Microorganisms responsible for malaria are identified by Charles Louis Alphonse Laveran. They belong to the genus Plasmodium, and their over 100 species can infect a variety of species, including birds, reptiles, birds, and many mammals.	Malaria	
1882	Discovery	Microorganisms responsible for tuberculosis are identified by Robert Koch. They infect the lungs as a pathogen of the mammalian respiratory system.	Tuberculosis	
1893	Publication	The International List of Causes of Death, a predecessor to the International Statistical Classification of Diseases and Related Health Problems, is adopted. It is based on the classification of causes of death that was used by the City of Paris, which represented German, English, and Swiss classifications.		
1902	Organization	The Pan American Health Organization is established as the Pan-American Sanitary Bureau in response to yellow fever epidemics.	Yellow fever (initially)	
1907	Organization	The Office International d'Hygiène Publique (OIHP) is founded. The OIHP helps to refine quarantine policies.		France
1913	Organization	The Rockefeller Foundation is founded by Standard Oil owner John D. Rockefeller in 1913. Its primary objectives include supporting prejudice-free education in the US through monetary donations, and establishing various public health departments for universities such as the Johns Hopkins School of Public Health and the Harvard School of Public Health.		United States (New York City, New York)
1918	Crisis	The 1918 flu pandemic (Spanish flu) is a deadly pandemic involving the Influenza A virus subtype H1N1 that infected over 500 million people all over the world, predominantly affecting healthy young individuals.	Influenza	France (origin, possibly disputed)
1922	Organization	The League of Nations Health Committee and Health Section is established in January 1920 as a direct response to the Paris Peace Conference that concluded the First World War, with a primary goal to prevent war and maintain world peace.		Geneva, Switzerland
1927	Discovery	The BCG vaccine for tuberculosis is developed in 1927. A small dose of Bacillus Calmette–Guérin (BCG) is recommended to be given to healthy babies close to the time of birth as a preventative drug, especially in developing countries where tuberculosis is common.	Tuberculosis	
1928	Discovery	Penicillin is an antibiotic discovered by Alexander Fleming in 1928, and its widespread use as a treatment for infections began in 1942. It is primarily used to treat bacterial infection caused by staphylococci and streptococci, and is among the first antibiotics to become highly effective. Though it still remains prevalent today, following widespread use, many forms of bacteria have developed a resistance against it.	Staphylococci and streptococci	
1930	Discovery	Researchers from Europe estimate that some time in the early 1930s a form of simian immunodeficiency virus, SIV, is transmitted to humans in central Africa. The mutated virus is later identified as the first of other human immunodeficiency viruses, HIV-1.	HIV-1	Europe
1943	Organization	United Nations Relief and Rehabilitation Administration (UNRRA) is founded for relief of victims of war in 1943, and becomes part of the United Nations in 1945. Primarily run by the United States, but representing 44 total nations, the UNRRA has a general purpose of providing basic necessities (including food and water, shelter, clothing, medical needs, etc.) to aid the relief of victims of war. Most of its operations would shut down in 1947.		Agreement signed in the United States (White House)
1945	Organization	The World Bank Group is formed as part of five international organizations to make leveraged loans to non-first-world countries, aiding in their economic endeavors to further develop. Based in Washington D.C., it is the biggest development bank in the world, with a mission to end extreme poverty and build shared prosperity. In 2014 alone, the WBG would provide approximately $61 billion in loans and assistance to these developing countries.		United States (Washington D.C.)
1946	Organization	UNICEF, also known as the United Nations Children's Emergency Fund, is founded in December 1946 by the United Nations General Assembly to provide food and healthcare to children in countries that were severely destroyed by the effects of World War II. One of its most popular fundraising programs is the Trick-or-Treat for UNICEF program, where kids collect money for children in need instead of candy at the houses they visit on Halloween.		United States (New York City)
1946	Organization	Centers for Disease Control and Prevention is founded initially as the Communicable Diseases Center. The CDC is a US federal agency under the Department of Health and Human Services, and is considered the leading national public health institute in the United States. Its main goal is to protect public health by controlling and preventing disease, disability, and injury.	Malaria (initially)	United States (Atlanta, Georgia)
1947	Crisis	A cholera epidemic takes 20,000 lives in Egypt in 1947 and 1948; this helps spur the international community to action. The World Medical Association is created on September 17 when 27 different countries sent physicians to meet up in Paris.	Cholera	Egypt
1947	Program launch	In the United States, the National Malaria Eradication Program (NMEP) is launched in July. Prior to the launch of this program, malaria is an endemic across the United States, concentrated in the southeastern states. This federal program would successfully eradicate malaria in the United States by 1951.	Malaria	United States
1948	Organization	The World Health Organization is established in April 1948 as a part of the United Nations that specializes in international public health. The WHO constitution is signed by a total of 61 countries on July 22, 1946, and holds a meeting of the World Health Assembly on July 24, 1948. With a focus on eradicating disease, the WHO played a huge role in the eradication of smallpox and is currently working on prevention and treatment of HIV/AIDS, malaria, tuberculosis, etc.	Smallpox (initially)	Switzerland (Geneva)
1948	Medical advancement	The first published randomized controlled trial (RCT) in medicine appears in a paper entitled "Streptomycin treatment of pulmonary tuberculosis", which describes a Medical Research Council investigation. One of the authors of this paper is Austin Bradford Hill, who is credited as having conceived the modern RCT.	Tuberculosis (initially)	
1950	Medical advancement	Mass tuberculosis immunization is under way with the BCG vaccine. This vaccine is recommended to be given intradermally, immediately after birth. This vaccine is mandatory to attend school in France between 1950 and 2007, introduced in Brazil in 1967, and to the Philippines in 1979.	Tuberculosis	
1952	Program launch	The global yaws control program is launched by WHO and UNICEF. The WHO Global Influenza Surveillance and Response System (GISRS) is created to establish a worldwide network of laboratories to collaborate and monitor influenza viruses.	Yaws	
1952	Crisis	A polio epidemic occurs in the United States. Polio is a serious, and potentially deadly or crippling, infection disease. By the mid-20th Century, breakouts of polio present a major health concern for children in the United States. In 1952, at the height of an epidemic, Jonas Salk introduces a vaccine for the disease, which has existed for thousands of years. The vaccine is able to help eradicate breakouts of polio in many parts of the world.	Polio	United States
1955	Medical advancement	The first inactivated polio vaccine by Jonah Salk is announced as safe and effective. Originally developed in 1952, this vaccine is researched by a team at the University of Pittsburgh and required many years of testing.	Polio	United States (Pittsburgh)
1958	Program launch	Smallpox eradication program is launched by World Health Assembly. Smallpox is officially eradicated by 1980, and is known as the first disease to be combated and eradicated on a global scale.	Smallpox	
1961	Organization	United States Agency for International Development (USAID) is formed in 1961 by President John F. Kennedy by Executive Order to administer civilian foreign aid. The primary goal of USAID is to "partner to end extreme poverty and to promote resilient, democratic societies while advancing the security and prosperity of the United States." It focuses on disaster relief, poverty relief, technical cooperation on global issues, U.S. bilateral interests, and socioeconomic development.		United States
1963	Medical advancement	Oral polio vaccine licensed. Oral polio vaccines were developed by medical researcher Albert Sabin, and became used commercially in the early 1960s. They soon become an important basic health system medicine on the World Health Organization's List of Essential Medicines.	Polio	
1965	Organization	International Agency for Research on Cancer, also known as the IARC, is an organization created to conduct research into the causes of cancer, and to collect and publish data regarding cancer occurrence worldwide. It is established as an intergovernmental agency in 1965, part of the World Health Organization and the United Nations.	Cancer	France (Lyons)
1970	Organization	Population Services International (PSI) is created as a nonprofit global health organization with programs targeting malaria, child survival, HIV, and reproductive health. PSI provides life-saving products, clinical services and behavior change communications.	Malaria, HIV/AIDS, child survival, and reproductive health	Washington, D.C. (operates worldwide)
1971	Organization	The Doctors Without Borders organization, or Médecins Sans Frontières (MSF), is founded in France in response to the Nigerian Civil War. As an international humanitarian aid non-governmental organization (NGO), Doctors Without Borders creates projects in developing countries that are battling severe endemic diseases. It is also a Nobel Peace Prize laureate, and focuses on war-torn countries. Unlike the Red Cross (an organization with a broadly similar mandate), MSF is willing to enter war-torn areas without the permission of authorities.		Switzerland (Geneva)(founded in France)
1974	Program launch	The Onchocerciasis Control Programme is launched in response to the dramatic consequences of the onchocerciasis epidemic in West Africa by the World Health Organization (WHO), with help by three other UN agencies – the World Bank, the Food and Agriculture Organization (FAO), and the United Nations Development Programme (UNDP).	Onchocerciasis	
1976	Discovery	The Ebola virus (EVD), also known as Ebola hemorrhagic fever (EHF) is first identified in 1976. Ebola is a viral hemorrhagic fever found in primates, primarily in humans, that is caused by ebolaviruses. The first symptoms include sore throat, muscular pain, headaches, and a strong fever, then resulting in internal bleeding and death.	Ebola	Democratic Republic of the Congo
1977	Publication	WHO Model List of Essential Medicines is first published by the World Health Organization, and included a total of 204 pharmaceutical drugs. Thereafter, the WHO updates the list every two years, and created separate sections for adults and children, including medicines from anaesthetics to medicines for diseases of joints (as shown in the 19th edition, published in April 2015).		
1977	Organization	PATH (formerly Program for Appropriate Technology in Health) is founded. PATH is an international, nonprofit global health organization based in Seattle. It is best known for developing and adapting technologies, such as improved vaccination devices and new tools to prevent cervical cancer, to address the health needs of developing countries. In the 21st century, the Gates Foundation would fund PATH and its subsidiaries to the tune of over a billion dollars, helping it grow to massive scale.		United States (Seattle, Washington)
1978	Declaration	The Alma Ata Declaration is established during the International Conference on Primary Health Care (PHC). The purpose of this conference is to develop a plan for primary health care across the world, especially benefiting the developing countries to keep a spirit of cooperation. As a result, the Declaration of Alma-Ata is adopted, and expresses the urgent worldwide need for a better health system to be place. The Declaration promotes health as a human right.		Kazakhstan
1979	Medical advancement	Eradication of smallpox (last naturally occurring case recorded). The eradication effort dates back to the time of Edward Jenner, an English physician who demonstrated that cowpox could protect humans from smallpox, thus beginning the eradication of smallpox on a regional scale. In 1813, the U.S. Congress passed the Vaccine Act to provide total access to the smallpox vaccine to the public in the United States. Similar measures were taken in other countries, and following the 1972 outbreak of smallpox in Yugoslavia, the disease is completely eradicated in 1979.	Smallpox	Worldwide
1982	Program launch	The child survival revolution (CSR) is an effort started by James P. Grant and UNICEF in collaboration with other organizations (such as the Rockefeller Foundation, UNDP, the World Bank, and the WHO) to reduce child mortality in the developing world. Grant advocates GOBI-FFF, a form of selective primary healthcare (which helps child development and increases maternal health and reduces child mortality). The entire CSR effort would last from 1982 to the 1990s.		
1984	Program launch	Demographic and Health Surveys (DHS) is conceived. The DHS Program is responsible for collecting and disseminating accurate, nationally representative data on health and population in developing countries.		
1986	Program launch	The Global Programme on AIDS (GPA) is launched by the World Health Organization (WHO). This program is designed to evaluate the scope of the global AIDS pandemic and to provide an organized international response to the deadly disease. By the late 1900s, the GPA would be implemented in more than 160 countries around the world.	HIV/AIDS	
1987	Organization	Partners In Health, a health care organization, is founded by Paul Farmer, Ophelia Dahl, Thomas J. White, Todd McCormack, and Jim Yong Kim. In the next 30 years, the organization pioneers community-based healthcare models, conducts post-earthquake rebuilding after the 2010 Haiti earthquake, and forms partnerships with other organizations (such as governments as well as the Clinton Health Access Initiative) to combat diseases including HIV/AIDS.		United States (Boston, Massachusetts)
1988	Program launch	The Global Polio Eradication Initiative (GPEI) is established by the WHO, UNICEF, and the Rotary Foundation during a large public health effort to eradicate the poliomyelitis (polio) disease worldwide. The main goal of the GPEI is to eliminate polio from all countries by the year 2000, and the last recorded case of the disease in the Americas is logged in Peru in August 1991.	Polio	
1990	Publication	The Global Burden of Disease Study (GBD) is commissioned by the World Bank. As a comprehensive global research program, it studies the disability and mortality that are directly caused by major diseases, injuries, and other risk factors. The general definition of "global burden of disease" is the "collective disease burden produced by all the diseases in the world."		
1990	Organization	The World Summit for Children takes place. The summit has the then-largest-ever gathering of heads of state and government to commit to a set of goals to improve the well-being of children worldwide by the year 2000. It is the first time a UN conference set a broad agenda for a wide range of goals in health, education, nutrition and human rights.		
1993	Publication	The first edition of Disease Control Priorities in Developing Countries (DCP1) is published. The DCPP is a project that seeks to determine the priorities for disease control around the world, focusing efforts in developing countries and low-income countries.		
1993	Publication	The 1993 World Development Report on investing in global health is published. This report "changed the terms of discourse in international health development" by prioritizing health problems with a large disease burden for which cost-effective interventions were available.		
1994	Organization	The Agreement on Trade-Related Aspects of Intellectual Property Rights (TRIPS Agreement) is an international agreement administered by the World Trade Organization (WTO) that sets down minimum standards for many forms of intellectual property (IP) regulation as applied to nationals of other WTO members. Applied to global health, the most visible conflict has been over HIV/AIDS drugs in Africa. The Doha Declaration is issued in November 2001, indicating that TRIPS should not prevent states from dealing with public health crises.		signed in Uruguay
1995	Program launch	International Commission for the Certification of Dracunculiasis Eradication is established by the WHO to evaluate the status of countries applying for the certification of dracunculiasis eradication. The requirements for a country to be deemed "free of transmission" include zero indigenous cases over a complete year.	Dracunculiasis	Switzerland (Geneva)
1995	Program launch	DOTS (Directly Observed Treatment, Short-Course) strategy for tuberculosis is launched by the World Health Organization. This is the tuberculosis control strategy that is deemed the best curative method by the WHO, adopting the motto that "the most cost-effective way to stop the spread of TB in communities with high incidence is to cure it."	Tuberculosis	
1996	Organization	The Joint United Nations Programme on HIV/AIDS (UNAIDS) is established to advocate for coordinated global action regarding the spread of HIV/AIDS across the world. The program aims to slow the spread of the disease so the epidemic does not become a pandemic by providing adequate leadership to provide effective action on the epidemic.	HIV/AIDS	Switzerland (Geneva)
1999	Program launch	Médecins Sans Frontières launch the Campaign for Access to Essential Medicines. It pushes to lower the prices of existing drugs, vaccines and diagnostic tests, to stimulate research and development into new treatments for diseases (tuberculosis among them) that primarily affect the poor.		
2000	Program launch	Stop TB Partnership is launched to eliminate tuberculosis as a public health problem across international borders. Previously administered by the World Health Organization, the partnership is now hosted by the United Nations Office for Project Services (UNOPS).	Tuberculosis	Switzerland (Geneva)
2000	Organization	The Global Outbreak Alert and Response Network is launched by the World Health Organization. During a medical crisis, this organization ensures the correct technical expertise will be located in the critical areas in an event of an outbreak.		
2000	Organization	Bill & Melinda Gates Foundation (BMGF) is founded by Bill Gates and his wife Melinda Gates. It is currently the largest transparently operated private foundation in the world. This non-governmental organization aims to reduce extreme poverty and improve healthcare around the world, and has been praised as well as critiqued for its influence on the global health landscape. According to foundation grants data available in the International Aid Transparency Initiative database, the foundation has, since 2009, granted about $10 billion to infectious disease control, malaria, AIDS, and tuberculosis control, health policy and administrative management, and basic health care (see Bill & Melinda Gates Foundation § Grants made for more).		
2000	Declaration, publication	At a United Nations Summit in 2000, member nations declare eight Millennium Development Goals (MDGs), which reflect the major challenges facing human development globally, to be achieved by 2015. The declaration is matched by unprecedented global investment by donor and recipient countries. According to the UN, these MDGs provided an important framework for development and significant progress has been made in a number of areas. However, progress would turn out to be uneven and some of the MDGs are not fully realized including maternal, newborn and child health and reproductive health.		
2000	Program launch	The GAVI Alliance, a public-private global health partnership, forms to promote the use of vaccines and increase the access to immunization in developing countries. It brings together developing countries and donor governments, working with the World Health Organization, UNICEF, the World Bank, and other organizations. The Gates Foundation would be a major funder of GAVI, spending billions of dollars on it.		Switzerland (Geneva)
2001	Program launch	The Measles Initiative, also known as the Measles & Rubella Initiative (MRI), is launched as a partnership among leaders in public health and supports the goal of reducing deaths by the measles disease globally by 90% by 2010 compared to the estimates in 2000.	Measles	
2001	Declaration	The Doha Declaration on the TRIPS Agreement and Public Health is adopted by the WTO Ministerial Conference of 2001 in Doha on November 14, 2001. It reaffirms flexibility of TRIPS member states in circumventing patent rights for better access to essential medicines.		Qatar (Doha)
2001	Organization	The Center for Global Development (CGD), a nonprofit think tank based on Washington, D.C., that focuses on international development, is founded by Edward W. Scott, C. Fred Bergsten, and Nancy Birdsall. CGD would go on to publish influential global health publications such as Millions Saved: Proven Successes in Global Health under the umbrella of its Global Health Policy Research Network. A report by a CGD working group on advance market commitments for vaccines, prepared between 2003 and 2005, would play a key role in the launch of the first AMC in 2009.		United States (incorporated; serves the whole world)
2002	Organization	The Global Fund to Fight AIDS, Tuberculosis and Malaria (also called the Global Fund or GFATM) is founded as an international financing organization that disburses monetary resources to aid prevention and treatment of the three biggest diseases in developing countries (AIDS, tuberculosis, and malaria)." Beginning its operations in January 2002, the Global Fund has its secretariat based in Geneva, Switzerland. Bill Gates is one of the first private donors that provided seed money for this project. The Gates Foundation would continue to be a major donor to the Global Fund, with several commitments of over 100 million dollars.	HIV/AIDS, Tuberculosis, Malaria	Switzerland (Geneva)
2002	Organization	The Clinton Health Access Initiative launches as the Clinton HIV/AIDS Initiative under the Clinton Foundation. In 2010, it becomes a standalone organization and is renamed the Clinton Health Access Initiative. As of 2016, the Bill & Melinda Gates Foundation is CHAI's biggest funder, having donated $60 million in 2015 alone.	HIV/AIDS (initially)	United States (incorporated; but primarily serves Africa)
2002	Publication	The first World report on violence and health is launched in October 2002, offering the first review of the issue of violence around the world, including its definition, its aftereffects on the human race, and possible solutions.		
2002	Publication	The Commission on Intellectual Property Rights, Innovation and Public Health is created by the British government to look into the effects of different intellectual property rights on developing countries and low-income citizens. The final report is published in September 2002.		
2002	Crisis	Severe acute respiratory syndrome (SARS) is a viral respiratory disease of zoonotic origin caused by the SARS coronavirus. A serious outbreak of SARS began in southern China in November 2002 and caused 8,096 cases and 774 deaths reported in 37 countries, with a majority of cases in Hong Kong.	SARS	China (but spread to multiple countries)
2003	Program launch	At the World Economic Forum in Davos in January, Bill Gates announces the Grand Challenges In Global Health. The initiative is funded by the Gates Foundation working with the National Institutes of Health, and started with a $200 million grant to the Foundation for the National Institutes of Health. The fourteen grand challenges are announced in October 2003. Two new challenges are added in 2011.		
2003	Program launch	The 3 by 5 Initiative is launched by the World Health Organization to provide antiretroviral treatment (ART) to patients with HIV/AIDS in low- and middle-income countries, beginning the scaling of ART across the world. The name "3 by 5" comes from the goal of treating 3 million people with this disease by 2005.	HIV/AIDS	
2003	Publication	The WHO Framework Convention on Tobacco Control (WHO FCTC) is a treaty adopted by the 56th World Health Assembly in May 2003. As one of the most quickly ratified treaties in United Nations history, it is an international agreement that seeks to protect mankind from the deadly impacts of tobacco consumption and exposure to tobacco smoke by setting universal standards to limit its use worldwide.		
2003	Program launch	The President's Emergency Plan for AIDS Relief (PEPFAR) is launched. PEPFAR is a United States government initiative under United States President George W. Bush that addresses the global HIV/AIDS epidemic and helps save the lives of those suffering from the disease, primarily in Africa. The program provides antiretroviral treatment to 2 million HIV-infected people in resource-limited settings.	HIV/AIDS	United States (targeting Africa)
2004	Publication	The Global Strategy on Diet, Physical Activity and Health is adopted by the World Health Organization, to report the development of the strategy to improve nutrition and physical health and its importance in the prevention of disease across the world.		
2005	Program launch	To address the social factors that lead to poor health and health inequities, the Commission on Social Determinants of Health (CSDH) is created by the World Health Organization in March, supported by global health partners.		
2005	Program launch	The Partnership for Maternal, Newborn & Child Health (PMNCH), chaired by Graça Machel, is launched by the WHO to achieve universal access to comprehensive, high-quality reproductive, maternal, newborn, and child health care.		
2006	Publication	The second edition of Disease Control Priorities in Developing Countries (DCP2) is published to essentially provide a "checkup" for health care services across the world and global health as a whole. It reports how certain countries have accomplished stable and wide-reaching healthcare systems, achieving health priorities in developing countries, improvements in closely related sectors, etc.		
2007	Organization	The Institute for Health Metrics and Evaluation (IHME), a research institute working in the area of global health statistics and impact evaluation at the University of Washington in Seattle, is launched in June based on a core grant of $105 million primarily funded by the Bill & Melinda Gates Foundation. The emergence of IHME has been argued to have introduced competition to the field of global health metrics, which was previously a field where WHO maintained a monopoly.		United States (Seattle)
2007	Organization	GiveWell, a charity evaluator, is founded. GiveWell has investigated the effectiveness of numerous charities in global health and has reviewed reports including those published by the Disease Control Priorities Project. A spinoff known as the Open Philanthropy Project begins as GiveWell Labs in 2011 and gets its current name in 2014. Most of GiveWell's top-recommended charities are in the field of global health, including current top recommendations Against Malaria Foundation, Schistosomiasis Control Initiative, and Deworm the World Initiative, as well as previous recommended charities VillageReach and Stop TB Partnership. In 2015, GiveWell-recommended charities raise a total of $110.1 million based on GiveWell's charities, of which $56 million goes to the recommended charities in global health.		United States
2009	Program launch	The launch of the first advance market commitment (AMC) is formally announced by the GAVI Alliance. It is for a pneumococcal vaccine and is funded by $1.5 billion from the Bill & Melinda Gates Foundation and the governments of the United Kingdom, Canada, Russia, and Norway, with a promise of an additional $1.3 billion through 2015 from the GAVI Alliance. AMCs had been explored in a Center for Global Development Working Group from 2003 to 2005, and work on funding for the pneumococcal vaccine AMC had begun in 2007.	Pneumococcal infection	
2013	Crisis	The West African Ebola virus epidemic is the most widespread epidemic of Ebola in recorded history, beginning in 2013 and continuing through the next two years, mainly affecting three West African countries.	Ebola	
2015	Publication	Building on the MDGs, a new Sustainable Development Agenda with 17 Sustainable Development Goals (SDGs) is established for the years 2016–2030. The SDGs are an intergovernmental set of aspiration goals with 169 targets that aim to transform our world into a better place by ending poverty and hunger, helping the environment, improving health and education, etc. The first goal is an ambitious and historic pledge to end poverty.		
2015	Publication	Transforming our world: the 2030 Agenda for Sustainable Development is adopted by the 193 countries of the UN General Assembly. On 25 September 2015, the 193 countries of the UN General Assembly adopt the 2030 Development Agenda titled Transforming our world: the 2030 Agenda for Sustainable Development.		
2015	Publication	To Save Humanity is published. The book contains nearly 100 essays regarding today's most pressing global health issues. The essays are authored by global figures in politics, science, and advocacy ranging from Bill Clinton to Peter Piot, and address a wide range of issues including vaccinations, antimicrobial resistance, health coverage, tobacco use, research methodology, climate change, equity, access to medicine, and media coverage of health research.		
2016	Publication	As of April 2016, four of nine volumes of the third edition of the Disease Control Priorities Project (DCP3) have been published online. The nine volumes include essential surgery, reproductive health, cancer, mental disorders, cardiovascular disorders, major infectious diseases, injury prevention, child development, and a summary volume.		
2016	Organization	The Chan Zuckerberg Initiative, run by Facebook principal founder and CEO Mark Zuckerberg and his wife Priscilla Chan, announces its plan to create Chan Zuckerberg Science with $3 billion in funding over the next decade. Chan Zuckerberg Science's goal is to accelerate progress in the eradication of all diseases by the end of the 21st century. Of this, $600 million would be spent on a Biohub in San Francisco, to allow for easy interaction and collaboration between scientists at UCSF, University of California, Berkeley, Stanford University, and other universities in the area, as well as engineers and others. Commentators see the move as audacious but a worthwhile goal, while noting that the amount of funding is small relative to overall money spent on biomedical research.		
2017	Organization	Global Health Council was established. Global Health Council strives to use the power of the collective voice to improve global health and wellbeing through informed investments and policies.		
2019–present	Crisis	The COVID-19 pandemic spreads around the world within a few weeks or months, precipitating massive economic shutdowns, travel restrictions, intense research, the development of COVID-19 vaccines and the creation of COVAX to aid lower-income countries.	COVID-19	Worldwide

== See also ==
=== General ===
- List of diseases eliminated from the United States
- Timeline of vaccines

=== Disease timelines ===
- Timeline of HIV/AIDS
- Timeline of influenza
- Timeline of deworming
- Timeline of the 2019-20 coronavirus pandemic

=== Others ===
- Priority-setting in global health
- Timeline of psychiatry (timeline of mental health)
