= The State of the World's Children =

The State of the World's Children is an annual report published by the United Nations Children's Fund (UNICEF). It is the flagship publication of the organization. The first report was published in 1980, having been introduced by James P. Grant (the executive director of UNICEF at the time). Peter Adamson was the author of the report for 15 years. The publication of the 1982–1983 The State of the World's Children report marked the start of the child survival revolution.

Following the end of Grant's tenure at UNICEF and his death in 1995, The State of the World's Children has received significantly less attention.

== Content ==
The State of the World's Children 1982–1983 launches the child survival revolution and pushed for GOBI (growth monitoring, oral rehydration therapy, breastfeeding, and immunization).

The 1988 report argues for the need of a "Grand Alliance" for children between governments, schools, mass media, etc., to continue the child survival and development revolution.

The 1991 report features the World Summit for Children, which happened the previous year. The report covers the commitment made by the Summit and serves as a record.

The 2015 The State of the World's Children report, titled Reimagine the Future, reviews the work on children's health and rights in the world in the context of the 25th anniversary of the Convention on the Rights of the Child. The report also argued that more innovation is necessary, and highlighted examples including Solar Ear (a solar-rechargeable hearing aid battery charger) and community-based management of acute malnutrition.

== See also ==
- Timeline of global health
