= Timeline of deworming =

This is a timeline of deworming, and specifically mass deworming.

== Big picture ==
Time period	Key developments
Late 17th century	Birth of modern helminthology as European physicians first detail anatomy of parasitic worms.
1851–1915	Understanding of and interest in schistosomiasis deepens as more people come in contact with the disease.
1948–present	Following World War II, the World Health Organization "has been the principal body concerned with the international support of research and control programmes" of schistosomiasis. However, despite this and the implementation of programs, prevalence of schistosomiasis increases in many areas.
1949–1997	Both Japan and South Korea successfully implement national programs to essentially eliminate soil-transmitted helminthiasis.
2001–present	The World Health Assembly declares deworming as a focus. Various deworming organizations form.

== Full timeline ==
Year	Event type	Event	Disease name	Geographic location
16th century BC		Schistosome parasites thought to first evolve in the Great Lakes of East Africa around this period.	Schistosomiasis	Africa
16th century BC		Guinea Worm is described in several ancient Egyptian texts, and is thought to be common in the area	Dracunculiasis	Egypt
1st Century – 7th Century	Discovery	Roman and Byzantine physicians are familiar with human roundworms and tapeworms and the infections that they cause.	Roundworm, tapeworm	Roman Empire
1683–1684	Discovery	Birth of modern helminthology. Detailed anatomy of the roundworm (Ascaris lumbricoides) is described, first by English physician Edward Tyson (1683), and shortly afterward by the Italian Francesco Redi (1684).	Roundworm	England, Italy
1799–1801	Crisis	Napoleon's soldiers almost certainly suffer from haematuria caused by schistosomiasis infection.	Schistosomiasis	
1851	Discovery	Theodor Bilharz discovers the parasite responsible for schistosomiasis.	Schistosomiasis	
1882	Publication	First mention of schistosomiasis in The Lancet.	Schistosomiasis	
1883		Interest in schistosomiasis heightens in England (and Europe more generally) due to more frequent encounter with the disease following English occupation of Egypt.	Schistosomiasis	England, Egypt
1893–1918	Program launch	Four commissions designed to understand schistosomiasis are sent to North Africa.	Schistosomiasis	Africa
1898	Discovery	Scientist Arthur Looss discovers that hookworms enter the body by boring through the skin when he accidentally infects himself.	Hookworm	
1909	Organization	The Rockefeller Sanitary Commission for the Eradication of Hookworm Disease (RSC) is founded. One of RSC's main goals is to eradicate hookworm disease in Southern United States. The RSC is active from 1910 to 1914, and closes in 1915. It is replaced by the International Health Division (IHD), another Rockefeller Foundation initiative, which tackled public health concerns on a global level.	Hookworm	United States
1914–1934		Overdose of oil of chenopodium, administered as part of the Rockefeller hookworm eradication program, causes over 200 documented deaths. More than 80% of deaths occur in children under 12.	Hookworm	
1915	Discovery	Robert Thomson Leiper works out the life-cycle of schistosomiasis.	Schistosomiasis	
1926–1931	Successful eradication	Guinea Worm is eradicated in Uzbekistan through a series of health education and sanitation measures.	Dracunculiasis	Uzbekistan
1927–1951		Attempts are made to kill the intermediate hosts for schistosomiasis (i.e. snails) using copper sulfate instead of sanitation and health education. The reasoning here is to prevent the schistosomiasis life-cycle from being completed. However it is unclear if these measures reduced the prevalence of schistosomiasis.	Schistosomiasis	
1938		Schistosomiasis Commission proposed by Hilmy Bey; the League of Nations Health Committee suggests more research on the disease, but nothing is done due to the imminence of World War II (among other reasons).	Schistosomiasis	
1939–1945	Crisis	Allied soldiers affected by schistosomiasis in China, the Philippines, and the Pacific Islands. This brings the disease to international attention.	Schistosomiasis	
1942	Program launch	Schistosomiasis control program begins in Venezuela.	Schistosomiasis	Venezuela
1947	Publication	First assessment of the distribution of schistosomiasis in the world by Norman Stoll.	Schistosomiasis	
1948	Program launch	The first World Health Assembly decides to establish an "Expert Committee" to deal with schistosomiasis.	Schistosomiasis	
1949	Program launch	Volunteer organizations for deworming form in Tokyo and Osaka, which implement "biannual school-based mass screening and treatment".	Soil-transmitted helminthiasis	Japan
1955	Program launch	Japan Association of Parasite Control (JAPC) forms. JAPC is a consolidation of several previous deworming groups that existed.	Soil-transmitted helminthiasis	Japan
1965–1995	Program launch	Korea Association for Parasite Eradication models their deworming program (a "biannual school-based mass screening and treatment program") off Japanese programs.	Soil-transmitted helminthiasis, hookworm, etc.	South Korea
1971	Successful eradication	Iran eliminates dracunculiasis.	Dracunculiasis	Iran
mid-1980s		Under Japan Association of Parasite Control, deworming efforts lead to "very minimal levels" of Ascaris.	Soil-transmitted helminthiasis	Japan
1986–present	Organization	The Carter Foundation begins a campaign to eradicate Guinea worm. The incidence of guinea worm infection declines sharply, from an estimated 3.5 million cases in 1986 to 22 reported cases in 2015.	Dracunculiasis	
1997		The World Health Organization declares South Korea "essentially worm-free".	Soil-transmitted helminthiasis	South Korea
2001		The World Health Assembly declares the goal of 75% of schoolchildren in endemic areas receiving deworming treatment.	Schistosomiasis, Soil-transmitted helminthiasis	
2002	Organization	The Schistosomiasis Control Initiative (SCI) established after being funded by the Bill & Melinda Gates Foundation. Since 2013 SCI has been a GiveWell top charity.	Schistosomiasis	
2007	Organization	Deworm the World Initiative is founded. Since 2014 Deworm the World Initiative has been a GiveWell top charity.	Soil-transmitted helminthiasis	
2012	Program launch	Various organizations announce a coordinated effort to eliminate or control 10 neglected tropical diseases, including both schistosomiasis and soil-transmitted helminthiasis.	Schistosomiasis, soil-transmitted helminthiasis	
2015		The "deworming debate" takes place starting in July on whether deworming is effective.		

== See also ==
- Helminthiasis
- List of diseases eliminated from the United States
- Neglected tropical diseases
- Soil-transmitted helminthiasis
- Timeline of global health
