= Instituto Nacional de Salud Pública =

National Institute of Public Health (Mexico)
- Instituto Nacional de Salud Pública
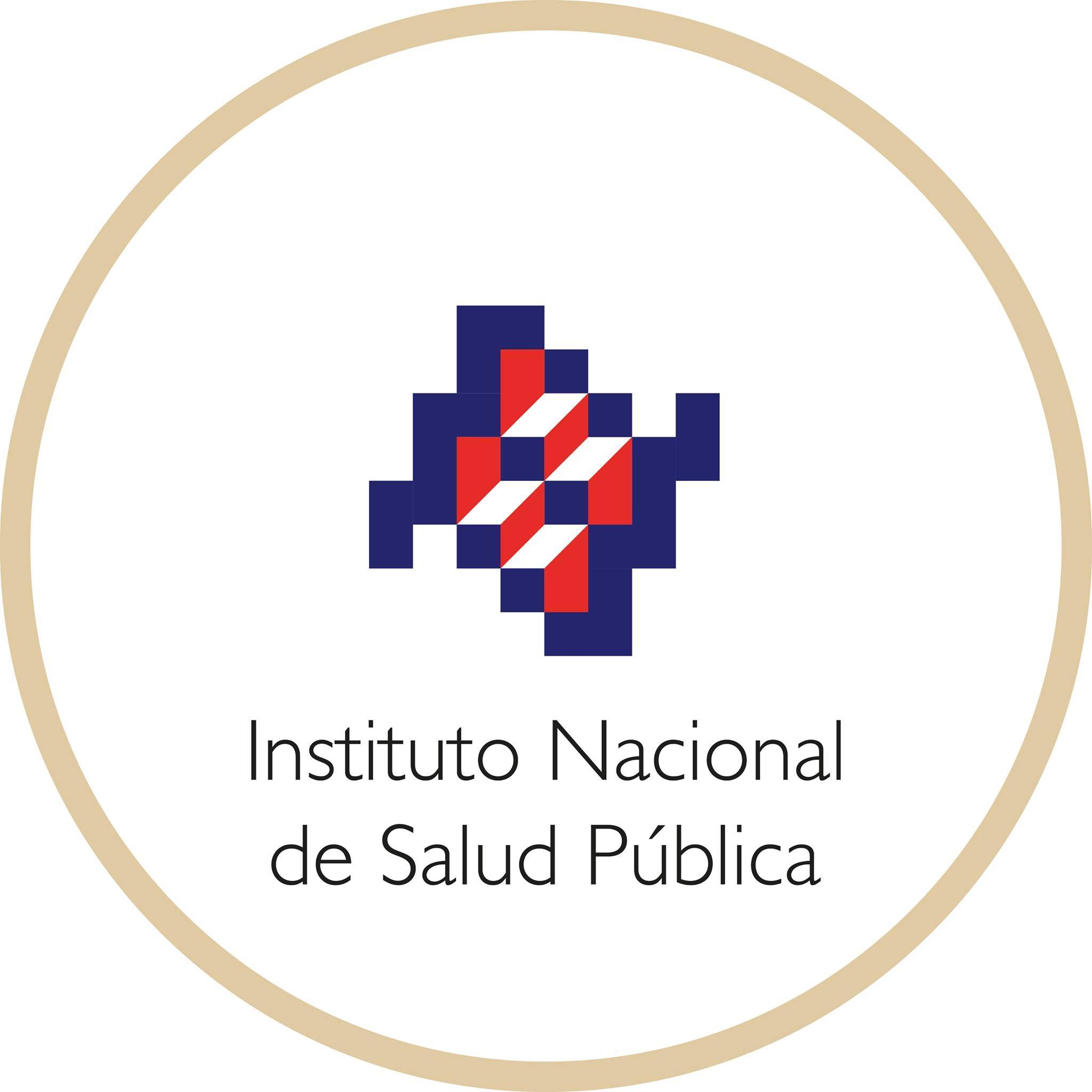
- Instituto Nacional de Salud Pública Logo
- Research type: Government Research Institute
- Director: Dr Eduardo Lazcano Ponce
- Website: insp.mx

The Instituto Nacional de Salud Pública (INSP) (English: National Institute of Public Health of Mexico) is a leading research and academic institution specializing in public health, epidemiology, and biomedical sciences. It operates under the Secretariat of Health of Mexico and is headquartered in Cuernavaca, Morelos.

== History ==
The INSP was established in 1987 to consolidate public health research and training efforts in Mexico Julio Frenk was its founding Director. It resulted from the merger of various institutions, including the Escuela de Salud Pública de México (School of Public Health of Mexico), which has trained health professionals since 1922.

== Research and academic programs ==
The INSP conducts interdisciplinary research in:Epidemiology and Biostatistics; Maternal and Child Health; Nutrition and Chronic Diseases; Environmental Health; Infectious Diseases and Vaccination; Health Systems and Health Policy.

The institute also offers postgraduate education, providing Master's and Doctoral programs in Public Health, Epidemiology, and Health Policy.

== Impact and contributions ==
The INSP has played a critical role in shaping public health policies in Mexico, by providing scientific evidence on multiple topics: National Health & Nutrition Surveys (ENSANUT), which provide essential data on obesity, diabetes, and malnutrition in the country. Research on COVID-19, vaccine efficacy, and disease prevention strategies.; Studies on maternal and child health, including the impact of cesarean sections on neurodevelopment.; Contributions to global research on non-communicable diseases, including cancer, diabetes, and cardiovascular diseases.

== International collaborations ==
INSP collaborates with global institutions such as the World Health Organization (WHO); the Pan American Health Organization (PAHO); the Harvard T.H. Chan School of Public Health amongst others.
