= Child survival revolution =

UNICEF project to reduce child mortality

The child survival revolution (also called the child survival and development revolution) was an effort started by UNICEF (but joined by others) to reduce child mortality in the developing world. The effort lasted from 1982 to the 1990s, and generally coincides with James P. Grant's tenure as executive director of UNICEF (1980–1995). The child survival revolution included various programs and conferences, including the World Summit for Children in 1990.

Rather than treating child mortality as a measurement of development, the effort sought to directly reduce child mortality as a way toward development.

Although the revolution was started by UNICEF, other organizations, including the Rockefeller Foundation, UNDP, the World Bank, and WHO joined; thus the revolution is sometimes called "a grand alliance for children". The revolution was analogized with the Green Revolution by James Grant.

== Timeline ==
Year	Event
1978	Alma Ata Declaration is established. The Declaration promotes health as a human right, and promotes primary healthcare.
1979	Walsh and Warren propose selective primary healthcare as a subset of primary healthcare that is intended to be more attainable. Selective primary healthcare is the basis of GOBI-FFF and the child survival revolution.
1982	The child survival revolution is started by James P. Grant at UNICEF with the publication of the 1982–1983 The State of the World's Children report.
1985	The policy of Adjustment with a Human Face (structural adjustment without sacrificing child nutrition) begins to be promoted.
1985	Schoolteachers in Turkey end their vacations three weeks early to help with immunization in a national campaign. As a result, immunization levels increase from under 20% to 84%.
1989	The Convention on the Rights of the Child is opened for signature. The convention sets out the civil, political, economic, social, health and cultural rights of children.
1990	The World Summit for Children takes place. The summit has the then-largest-ever gathering of heads of state and government to commit to a set of goals to improve the well-being of children worldwide by the year 2000. It is the first time a UN conference had set a broad agenda for a wide range of goals in health, education, nutrition and human rights.
1995	James P. Grant resigns from executive director of UNICEF and dies a few days later.
2007	The revolution loses much of its momentum.

== Results and reception ==
The initial reaction to Grant's announcement of the child survival revolution was overwhelmingly negative due to several reasons, including practical reasons, e.g., the money and infrastructure to support Grant's plans not existing.

It is estimated that the child vaccination increased worldwide from 20% in 1982(?) to 80% in 1990 because of the child survival revolution.

Writing in 1990, D. A. Henderson noted that although "dramatic progress" had been made because of the child survival revolution, the results were still "little-appreciated".

The child survival revolution is estimated to have saved the lives of 25 million children.

== Focus areas ==
The genesis of the Child Survival Revolution can be traced to 1973 when James P. Grant, gave his annual lecture at Johns Hopkins University's School of Public Health. In reviewing research findings of Prof Carl E. Taylor Grant grasped how the collective package from Taylor's Narangwal research (childhood pneumonia, oral rehydration therapy, neonatal tetanus, family planning) served as a parallel to The Green Revolution, saying "we can now start to talk about a Child Survival Revolution!" Grant had earlier been deputy director of USAID, and in that role had been an early and strong backer of The Green Revolution, a global effort that dramatically raised global food supply through a package of agricultural innovations (new seed types, fertilizer, irrigation, pesticides, and mechanization). Grant grasped that it was the synergy that came through a package of interventions that would allow children to survive,

For much of the child survival revolution, James Grant and UNICEF adopted a strategy known as GOBI-FFF, a form of selective primary healthcare:

G for growth monitoring to detect undernutrition in small children, O for oral rehydration therapy [ORT] to treat childhood diarrhea, B to encourage breastfeeding (which had declined precipitously due to working mothers and the marketing of infant formula), and I for immunization against the six basic childhood diseases: tuberculosis, polio, diphtheria, tetanus, whooping cough, and measles. (They added two Fs: food supplements and family planning; and, later, a third: female education.)

Of these, "immunization and ORT were seen as the 'twin-engines' of the child survival revolution".

After 1986, when studies by Alfred Sommer and others were published, vitamin A administration also became a focus.

== Organizations involved ==
Although the revolution was started by UNICEF, other organizations were involved.

- Rockefeller Foundation
- United Nations Development Programme (UNDP)
- World Bank
- World Health Organization (WHO)
- Rotary International pledged to raise $120 million.

== Use of mass media ==
UNICEF took advantage of the growing levels of basic education and access to television and radio to generate support for the child survival revolution through persuasion.

James Grant also "persuaded many heads of state to get personally involved in their national programmes for children, for example in their immunization by being photographed giving polio drops to a baby". Several figures from film and sports, like Audrey Hepburn, Liv Ullmann, and Peter Ustinov also participated in the UNICEF Goodwill Ambassador program.

== See also ==
- Timeline of global health
- Malthusianism
