= Julio Frenk =

Mexican public health scholar and sociologist

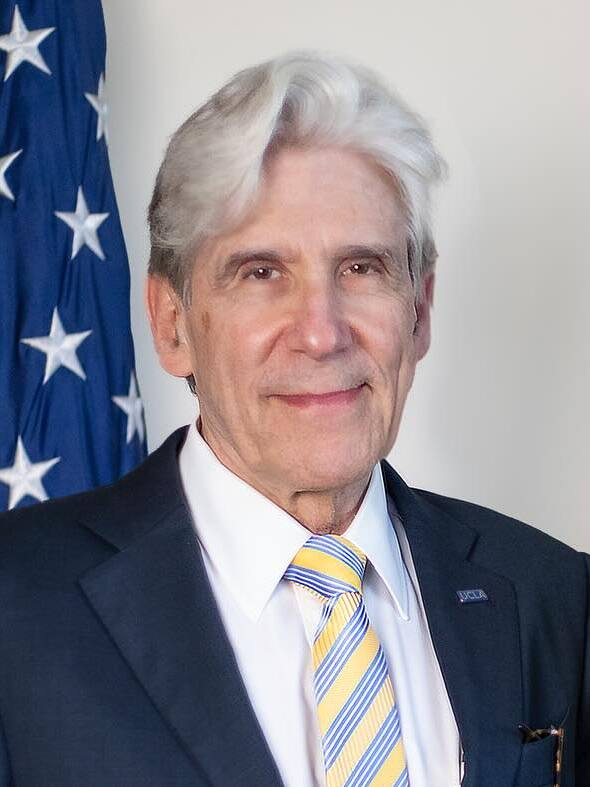
- Frenk in 2024

7th Chancellor of the University of California, Los Angeles
- Incumbent
- Assumed office January 1, 2025
- Preceded by: Gene Block; Darnell Hunt (acting)

6th President of the University of Miami
- In office August 16, 2015 – June 12, 2024
- Preceded by: Donna Shalala
- Succeeded by: Joseph Echevarria

17th Secretary of Health of Mexico
- In office December 1, 2000 – November 30, 2006
- President: Vicente Fox
- Preceded by: José Antonio González Fernández
- Succeeded by: José Ángel Córdova

Personal details
- Born: Julio José Frenk Mora; December 20, 1953 (age 72) Mexico City, Mexico
- Citizenship: Mexico; United States
- Spouse: Felicia Knaul (m. 1995)
- Relatives: Carlos Frenk (brother)
- Education: National Autonomous University of Mexico (BS, MD); University of Michigan (MPH, MA, PhD)
- Awards: Calderone Prize (2018)
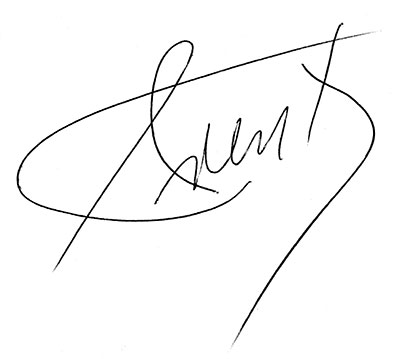
- Signature
- Scientific career
- Fields: Medical care organization; Sociology
- Thesis: Social Origin, Professional Socialization, and Labor Market Dynamics: The Determinants of Career Preferences among Medical Interns in Mexico (1983)

Julio José Frenk Mora (born December 20, 1953) is a Mexican and American public health scholar and sociologist who has been serving as the 7th chancellor of the University of California, Los Angeles (UCLA) since January 1, 2025.

Frenk graduated from the University of Michigan in 1983 with a Master of Public Health, a Master of Arts in sociology, and a joint PhD in medical care organization and sociology. After that, he became a public servant at the Ministry of Health of Mexico and served as the 17th Secretary of Health of Mexico from 2000 to 2006. He served as the 8th dean of the Harvard T.H. Chan School of Public Health from 2009 to 2015 and as the 6th president of the University of Miami in Florida from 2015 to 2024.

== Early life and education ==
Frenk was born on December 20, 1953, in Mexico City. His father and grandfather, both of whom were physicians, were Jews who fled to Mexico from Nazi Germany. His mother was Alicia Josefina Mora Alfaro, a Mexican biochemist. Frenk is the brother of Mexican astrophysicist Carlos Frenk. Frenk currently holds United States citizenship.

Frenk received an undergraduate medical degree from the National Autonomous University of Mexico in Mexico City in 1979. He then attended the University of Michigan, where he received a Master of Public Health in 1981, a Master of Arts in sociology in 1982, and a joint Doctor of Philosophy in medical care organization and sociology in 1983.

== Career ==
=== Government of Mexico ===
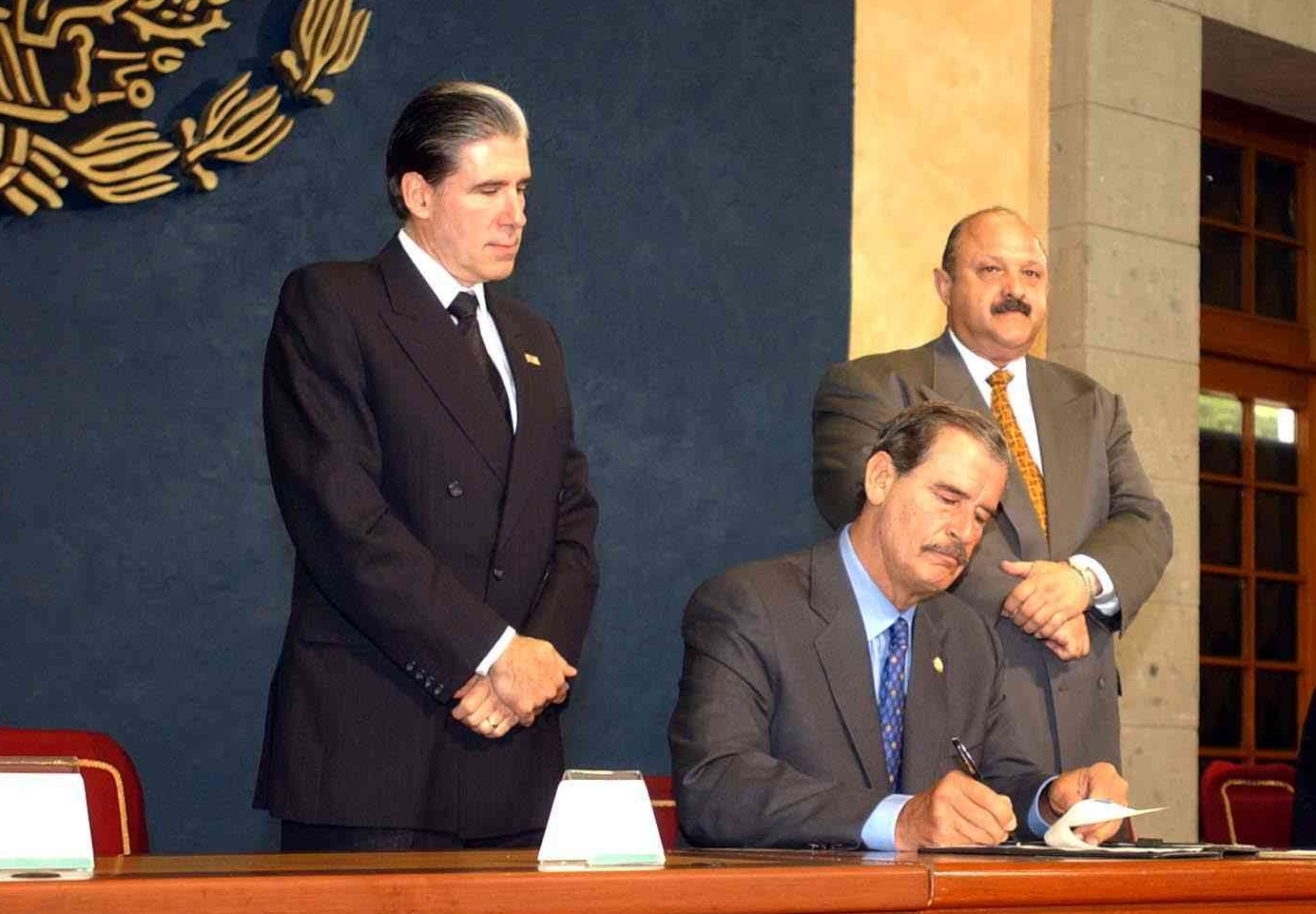
Frenk with Mexican president Vicente Fox and education secretary Reyes Tamez in Los Pinos during the initialing ceremony of the National Institute of Genomic Medicine in July 2004

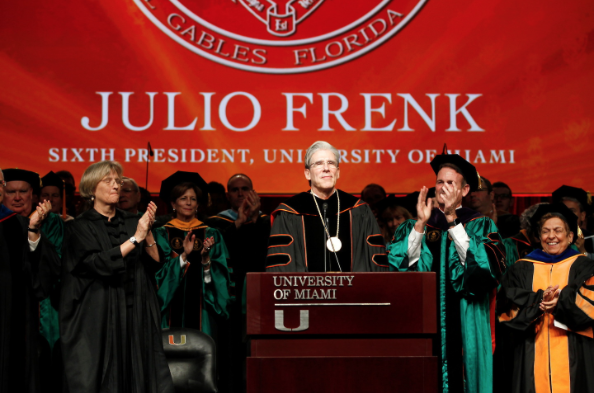
Frenk's official installation as the University of Miami's sixth president in January 2016

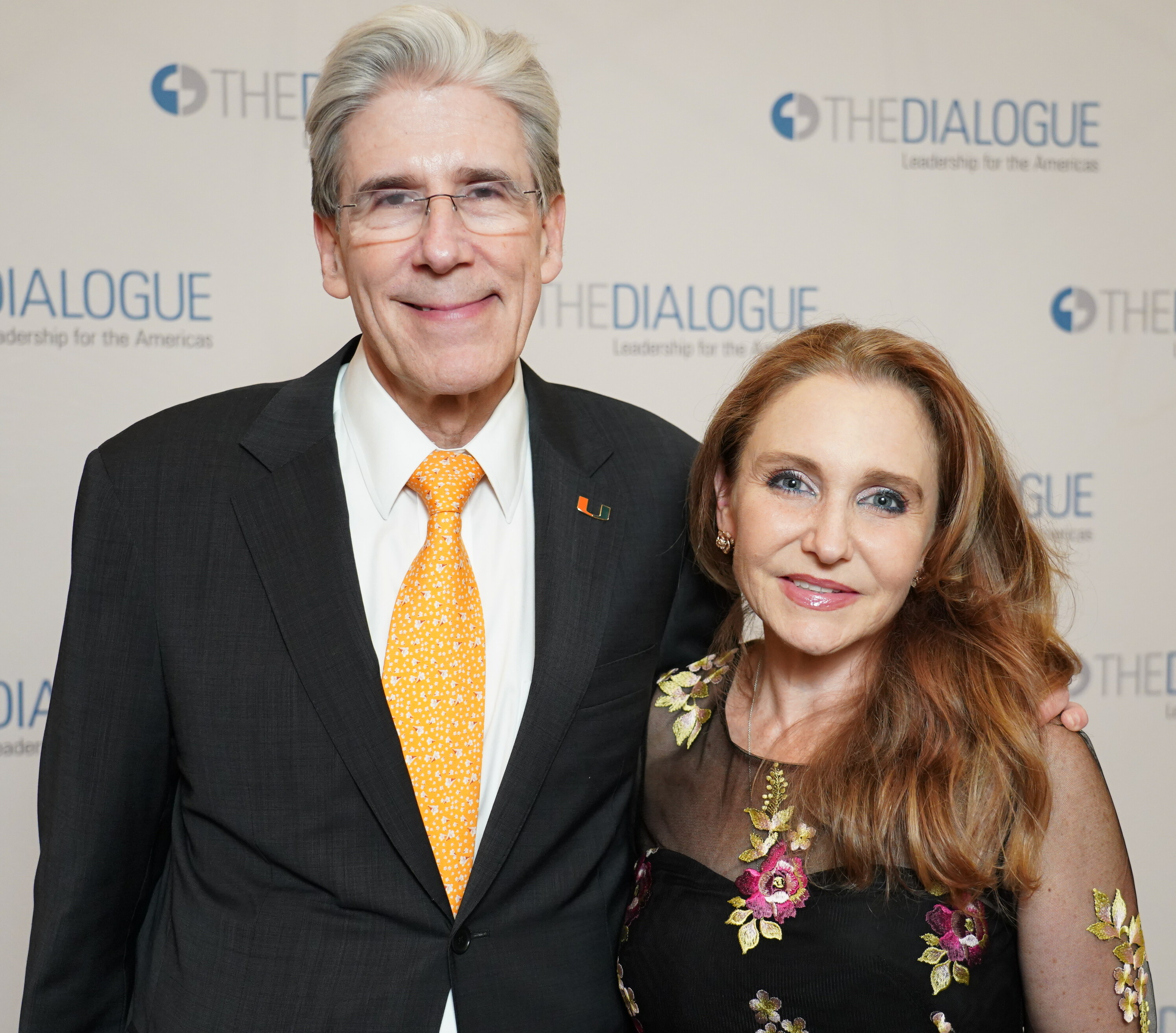
Frenk with wife Felicia Knaul in October 2018

In 1984, Frenk was appointed director of the Centre of Public Health Research in the Ministry of Health of Mexico, a role he held until 1987. Following that, he went on to serve as the founding director general of Mexico's Instituto Nacional de Salud Publica from 1987 to 1992. From 1995 to 1998, he served as executive vice president of the Mexican Health Foundation, a private non-profit organization, and director of the organization's Centre for Health and the Economy.

Frenk also has served in several academic roles, including as a senior researcher at the National Institute of Public Health and as adjunct professor of medicine and national researcher at the National Autonomous University of Mexico in Mexico City. In 1992–1993, he was visiting professor at the Harvard Center for Population and Development Studies at Harvard University's Harvard T.H. Chan School of Public Health.

In 1993, he was an advisor on health reform for the government of Colombia, working alongside health economist Felicia Knaul. The two married in 1995, and settled in Mexico.

In 1998, Frenk was appointed executive director of evidence and information for policy at the World Health Organization (WHO) in Geneva.

==== Minister of Health of Mexico ====
Frenk served as the 17th Secretary of Health of Mexico from December 2000 to November 2006.

Following the election of Vicente Fox in Mexico's 2000 presidential election, Frenk was appointed minister of health of Mexico, a position he held until December 2006. In 2003, as Mexico's secretary of health, Frenk introduced a comprehensive national health insurance program called Seguro Popular, which expanded access to health care for tens of millions of previously uninsured Mexicans.

In 2003, Frenk was among five final candidates for the position of director-general of the World Health Organization (WHO) alongside Lee Jong-wook, Pascoal Mocumbi, Peter Piot, and Ismail Sallam; Lee was eventually appointed the position.

In 2004, Frenk was criticized by tobacco control advocates for his role in cutting an unusual deal with tobacco companies in which Philip Morris and British American Tobacco agreed to donate $400 million for health programs in Mexico over two and a half years but reserved the right to cancel the donation if cigarette taxes were raised.

In September 2006, the Mexican government again nominated Frenk as a candidate for the leadership of the World Health Organization. The British medical journal The Lancet published an editorial endorsing Frenk as the best candidate while The Wall Street Journal reported that Frenk's controversial 2004 tobacco deal could hurt his chances for election. Along with Elena Salgado, Kazem Behbehani, Margaret Chan, and Shigeru Omi, Frenk was one of the five finalists for the position, which was awarded to Chan in November 2006.

=== Harvard School of Public Health ===
Frenk served as the 8th dean of the School of Public Health at Harvard University from 2009 to 2015.

Following his service as Mexico's minister of health, Frenk was tapped to serve as senior fellow in the global health program of the Bill & Melinda Gates Foundation, where he counseled the foundation on global health issues and strategies.

Frenk subsequently served as dean of the faculty at Harvard University's Harvard T.H. Chan School of Public Health from 2009 until 2015. While at Harvard, he was also the T & G Angelopoulos Professor of Public Health and International Development, a joint appointment made with the Harvard Kennedy School.

In January 2013, Frenk spent a week in China, seeking to strengthen ties between Harvard's School of Public Health and the Chinese government and the nation's healthcare sector.

Under Frenk's leadership, Harvard's School of Public Health received its largest ever gift of $350 million and was renamed Harvard T.H. Chan School of Public Health in 2014.

In addition to his role as dean of Harvard School of Public Health, Frenk co-chaired, along with Lincoln Chen, the Commission on the Education of Health Professionals for the 21st Century, which published its final report in The Lancet in 2010. The report recommended that governments place the same emphasis on fighting cancer that they place on infectious diseases like AIDS and malaria. He served on the High-Level Task Force for the International Conference on Population and Development, co-chaired by Joaquim Chissano and Tarja Halonen, from 2012 to 2014. In 2013, Frenk joined Vicente Fox and others in campaigning for marijuana legalization at a series of events in the United States and Mexico.

In 2015, Frenk co-edited a collection of non-fiction essays on the subject of global health, "To Save Humanity," which included work from Michelle Bachelet, Larry Summers, Elton John, Frenk, and others.

=== University of Miami ===
Frenk served as the 6th president of the University of Miami from August 2015 to June 2024.

On April 13, 2015, the University of Miami announced the appointment of Frenk as the university's sixth president, succeeding Donna Shalala. He was inaugurated on January 29, 2016. The University of Miami joined the Association of American Universities during Frenk's tenure.

On June 12, 2024, the University of California, Los Angeles announced that Frenk would be joining the university as its chancellor on January 1, 2025. The same day, the University of Miami announced that the university's chief executive officer, Joe Echevarria, had been appointed acting president of the University of Miami "effective immediately."

Under Frenk's nine years of leadership of the University of Miami, the university slipped notably on the U.S. News & World Report's ranking of national universities, which ranked the university 48th in the nation upon his arrival in 2015 and 67th in the nation upon his departure in 2024.

=== University of California, Los Angeles ===
On June 12, 2024, the Regents of the University of California named Frenk as the 7th chancellor of the University of California, Los Angeles, effective January 1, 2025, with an annual salary of US$978,904. According to the Los Angeles Times, his salary at UCLA was "a significant reduction from" his base pay of US$1.68 million at the University of Miami at the time of his departure.

== Other activities ==
- Commission for Universal Health, Chatham House
- Commonwealth Fund, member, board of directors (since 2010)
- Exemplars in Global Health, member, senior advisory board (since 2020)
- Miami-Dade Beacon Council, member, board of directors (since 2015)
- Robert Wood Johnson Foundation, member, board of trustees (since 2015)
- United Nations Foundation, member, board of directors (since 2016)

== Awards ==
- Cecilio A. Robelo Award for Scientific Research, State of Morelos, 1993
- Calderone Prize, 2018
- Fellow, Michigan Society of Fellows, the University of Michigan, (1982–1984)
- National researcher, Mexican Research System, Mexico City, (1984–1998)
- International Fellow in Health, W. K. Kellogg Foundation, (1986–1989)
- Member, National Academy of Medicine
- Member, Inter-American Dialogue

== Honors ==
- The Julio Frenk Professorship of Public Health Leadership was established at the Harvard T.H. Chan School of Public Health at Harvard University with part of a September 2016, $10 million gift.

Political offices
Preceded by José Antonio González Fernández	17th Secretary of Health; 2000–2006	Succeeded by José Ángel Córdova Villalobos
Academic offices
Preceded by Donna Shalala	6th President of the University of Miami; 2015–2024	Succeeded by Joseph J. Echevarria (acting)
Preceded by Gene Block; Darnell Hunt (interim)	7th Chancellor of the University of California, Los Angeles; 2025–present	Incumbent
