= Steven J. Hoffman =

Academic background
- Education: BA, McMaster University; MA, JD, political science, University of Toronto; PhD, health policy, Harvard University
- Thesis: Evaluating Strategies for Achieving Global Collective Action on Transnational Health Threats and Social Inequalities (2015)

Academic work
- Institutions: York University; Harvard University
- Notable works: To Save Humanity

Steven Justin Hoffman is a Canadian health scientist. In 2016, he was appointed Scientific Director of the CIHR Institute of Population and Public Health. He also serves as the Dahdaleh Distinguished Chair In Global Governance & Legal Epidemiology at York University.

== Early life and education ==
Hoffman was born in Toronto. He enrolled at McMaster University for his Bachelor of Health Sciences and the University of Toronto for his Master's degree and Juris Doctor. Following this, he practised at a Toronto law firm specializing in intellectual property litigation before enrolling at Harvard University for his PhD. He defended his thesis, "Evaluating Strategies for Achieving Global Collective Action on Transnational Health Threats and Social Inequalities" in 2015. As a doctoral student, Hoffman was awarded the 2012 Trudeau Scholarship and Fulbright Canada Student Award.

== Career ==
Following his PhD, Hoffman joined the faculty at the University of Ottawa and served as the director of the Global Strategy Lab and an associate professor of law, medicine and public and international affairs. While serving in this role, Hoffman was appointed scientific director of the CIHR Institute of Population and Public Health. Following this, he was promoted to full professor in York's School of Health Policy and Management.

On February 27, 2020, Hoffman was appointed the Dahdaleh Distinguished Chair In Global Governance & Legal Epidemiology at York. Later, Hoffman was chosen to lead a United Nations Deputy Secretary-General to lead the development of a United Nations Research Roadmap for the COVID-19 Recovery. Following this, he was awarded the Minister’s Award of Excellence by the Ministry of Colleges and Universities. In September 2021, Hoffman was elected a Fellow of the Canadian Academy of Health Sciences.
