= Felicia Knaul =

British-Canadian health economist (born 1966)

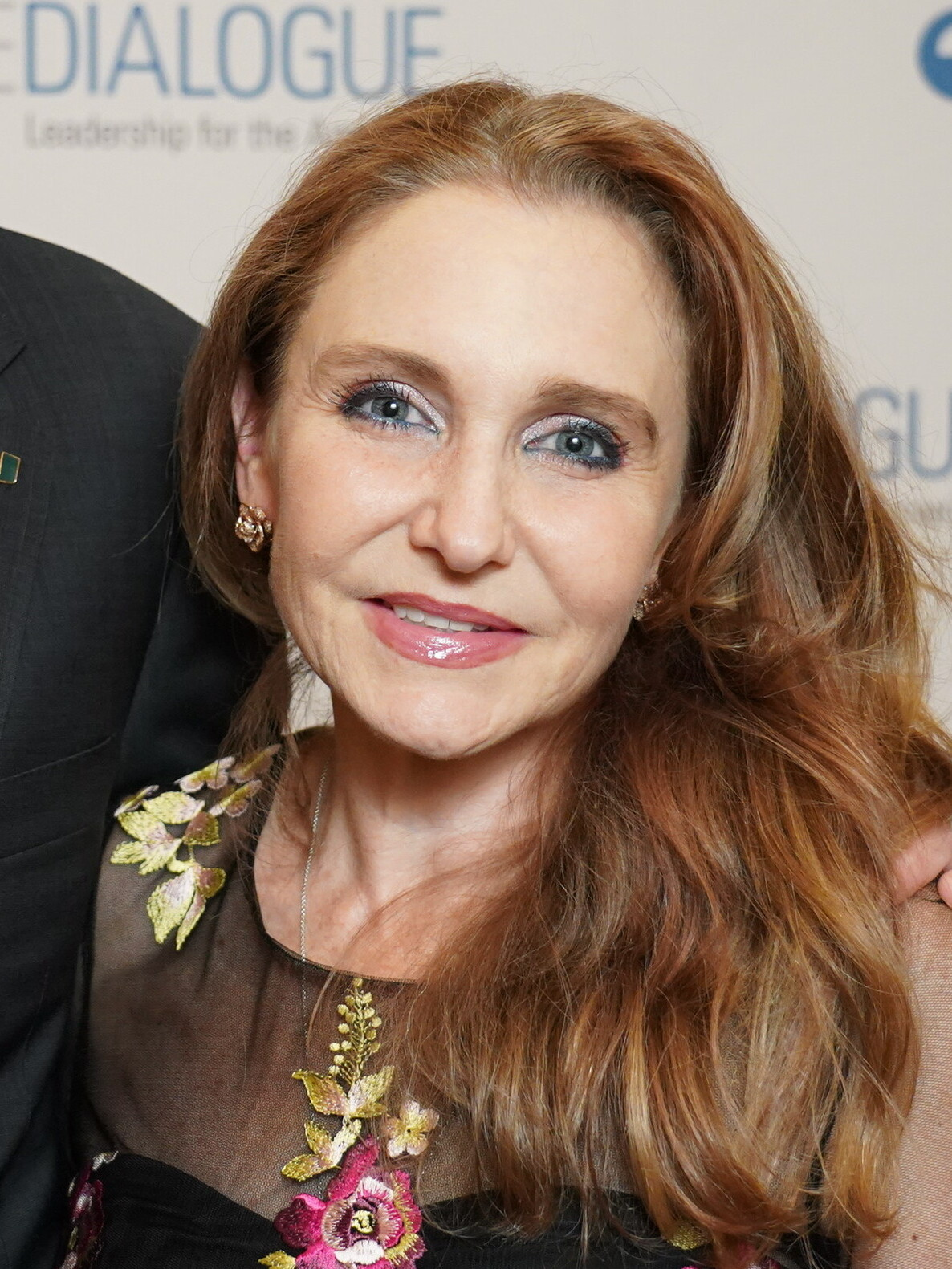
- Knaul in 2018
- Born: Felicia Marie Knaul; April 24, 1966 (age 60); Toronto, Ontario, Canada
- Education: Harvard University; University of Toronto
- Spouse: Julio Frenk (m. 1995)
- Scientific career
- Fields: Cancer; Health systems Women's health
- Workplaces: University of California Los Angeles; University of Miami; Harvard University
- Thesis: Young workers, street life and gender : the effect of education and work experience on earnings in Colombia (1995)
- Website: Associate of the Chancellor – UCLA

Felicia Marie Knaul is a Canadian health economist who is currently the Associate Chancellor of UCLA. She also holds appointments as a Professor of Medicine at the David Geffen School of Medicine, Professor in the UCLA School of Public Policy at the Luskin School of Public Affairs, Senior Advisor to the Dean and President of UCLA Health and Director of Global Health at the Jonsson Comprehensive Cancer Center. She is an economist with the Mexican Health Foundation and president of the non-governmental organization Tómatelo a Pecho, an advocacy organisation she and Julio Frenk founded, that promotes women's health in Latin America. Her research and leadership has focused around raising awareness of breast cancer in low and middle income countries.

== Early life and education ==
Knaul was born and raised in Toronto. Her father is a Holocaust survivor, whose family had been murdered by the Nazis. She said that "the mute cry of the Holocaust was tattooed on my father's forearm". In 1984, Knaul's father died from stomach cancer, an experience that would shape her lifelong commitment to improving access to healthcare. This experience motivated her to improve people's access to healthcare. Knaul was an undergraduate student in the University of Toronto, where she studied international development. During her early career, she worked with street children in Guatemala. She moved to the United States for graduate studies, specializing in economics at Harvard University in the research group of Amartya Sen.

== Research and career ==
Whilst completing her doctoral research, Knaul was appointed by the Colombian government to reform the Columbian Health System. She moved to Mexico, where she joined the Mexican Health Foundation and worked with her husband Julio Frenk, then Minister of Health, to establish the Seguro Popular. Seguro Popular was a social insurance system that provided Mexican people with access to health services. In partnership with Frenk, Knaul created school systems in hospitals to educate young people in long-term treatment. This received the Global Development Network Prize for Outstanding Research on Change. Knaul has focused on tackling aspects of healthcare which have historically been overlooked, including transforming access to palliative care and improving access to cancer screening.

Knaul served as chair of The Lancet commission on improving access to palliative care. It revealed that people in low and middle income countries often struggle to access palliative care, and that millions of adults and children die in considerable pain. She estimated that providing pain relief to suffering children would cost $1 million a year. She also highlighted that 90% of the morphine in the world is consumed by the world's richest 10% of people.

After her own experiences of breast cancer, Knaul focused on tackling disparities in access to cancer screening in Mexico. She established a non-profit in 2008 focused on improving women's awareness of the risks associated with breast cancer in 2007. The organisation, Cáncer de Mama: Tómatelo a Pecho's name derives from a Mexican saying ("take it to breast,"), which makes to take it seriously. She was appointed to the Lancet Commission on Women and Health in 2012, and argued that improving the health of girls and women is critical for sustainable development. In 2013, Knaul described her experiences in the book Beauty without the Breast.

In 2009, Knaul joined the faculty at the Harvard Global Equity Initiative, which was chaired by Amartya Sen. She worked to expand access to cancer care around the world, launching the Global Task Force on Expanded Access to Cancer Care. Within months of arriving, she coordinated an international conference on breast cancer care in low and middle income countries.

Knaul was appointed director of the Miami Institute for the Advanced Study of the Americas in 2016, where she worked to guide palliative care in Mexico.

=== Awards and honours ===
- 2015 Global Health Catalyst Award
- 2016 American Medical Women's Association Local Hero
- 2017 Fairchild Tropical Botanic Garden Philanthropy Award
- 2020 Autonomous University of Nuevo León Flama, Vida y Mujer
- 2020 Elected Fellow of the Canadian Academy of Health Sciences

=== Selected publications ===
- Felicia Marie Knaul; Eduardo González-Pier; Octavio Gómez-Dantés; et al. (2012). "The quest for universal health coverage: achieving social protection for all in Mexico". The Lancet. 380 (9849): 1259–1279. doi:10.1016/s0140-6736(12)61068-x. PMID 22901864. Wikidata Q47249820.
- Paul Farmer; Julio Frenk; Felicia M Knaul; et al. (2010). "Expansion of cancer care and control in countries of low and middle income: a call to action". The Lancet. 376 (9747): 1186–1193. doi:10.1016/s0140-6736(10)61152-x. PMID 20709386. Wikidata Q37779973.
- Felicia Marie Knaul; Paul E Farmer; Eric L Krakauer; et al. (2017). "Alleviating the access abyss in palliative care and pain relief-an imperative of universal health coverage: the Lancet Commission report". The Lancet. doi:10.1016/s0140-6736(17)32513-8. PMID 29032993. Wikidata Q46227940.

== Personal life ==
Knaul was diagnosed with stage II breast cancer in 2007. She underwent surgery in Mexico City, and, after a full mastectomy, had fifteen months of chemotherapy. She was treated with Trastuzumab, Herceptin and Tamoxifen.

Knaul is married to Julio Frenk, the current Chancellor of UCLA. Together they have two daughters, Hannah Sofia and Mariana Havivah.

Knaul is an avid equestrian and owns a 6 year-old Lusitano named "Poseidon", who moved with her from Wellington, FL to Los Angeles. They do dressage together, and she describes riding as an amazing way to clear her mind. Additionally, she is a passionate advocate for animal adoption, particularly of special needs animals. She currently has both a cat, Ziggy, and a shih tzu-poodle mix Shimon (nicknamed "Shimmy").
