= Teguest Guerma =

Ethiopian physician

Teguest Guerma is an Ethiopian medical doctor specializing in public health and HIV/AIDS. Guerma is appointed by the African Medical and Research Foundation Board of Directors as Director General in June 2010. She has been the Associate Director of the HIV/AIDS Department of the World Health Organization between 2004–2010.

== Career ==
She has started her career in HIV/AIDS in Burundi and has since extensively worked in Africa and South East Asia, including as country representative for the World Health Organization and Regional Advisor of HIV/AIDS for the Africa Regional Office of the WHO. She also represented the Africa Region of the World Health Organization at the United Nations headquarters in New York City from 2001–2004 and promoted African health issues, notably HIV/AIDS, tuberculosis and malaria, that has significantly contributed to their inclusion into resolution of the general assembly and the Security Council of the UN. She has been very instrumental in the establishment and initiation of a WHO and UNAIDS 3 by 5 Initiative. The 3 by 5 Initiative was a global target of putting 3 million people living with HIV on life saving antiretroviral treatment by end of 2005, which heralded a breakthrough to the access of HIV treatment in resource limited countries.

== Education ==
She did her undergraduate degree in Doctor of Medicine at the University of Reims Champagne-Ardenne in France and post graduate public health trainings at the University of Dakar in Senegal and Johns Hopkins University in the United States.
