= To Save Humanity =

2015 essay anthology edited by Julio Frenk and Steven J. Hoffman

- Front cover of To Save Humanity
- Editor: Julio Frenk, Steven J. Hoffman
- Language: English
- Genre: Non-fiction Essays
- Published: 2015 (Oxford University Press)
- Publisher: Oxford University Press
- Publication place: United States
- ISBN: 978-0-19-022154-6

To Save Humanity is a 2015 anthology of 96 essays on global health by authors who range from heads of states, movie stars, scientists at leading universities, activists, and Nobel Prize winners. Each contributor was asked the same question: "What is the single most important thing for the future of global health over the next fifty years?" The collection was edited by University of Miami president Julio Frenk and Canadian scientist Steven J. Hoffman.

== Reception ==
The Global Strategy Lab called the collection "unparalleled" and "a primer on the major issues of our time and a blueprint for post-2015 health and development," and featured it in their annual conference.

The Health Impact Fund also featured the collection at their conference.

The Lancet described the book as "testimony to the complexity of global health politics," and called it "a reminder that the breadth of individual and institutional engagement with global health cannot be fully captured by one set of global goals."

Vox has republished several of the articles for free online as part of a series titled "One Change to Save the World."

== Essays by notable figures ==
Author	Essay Title
Fazle Hasan Abed	Harnessing Women's Agency
Recep Akdag	Leadership for Health Equity
Michelle Bachelet	Governance and Leadership for Health
Joyce Banda	Prioritizing Vulnerable Populations
Seth Berkley	Vaccines- Accelerating Access For All
Ela Bhatt	Improving Health By Addressing Poverty
Agnes Binagwaho	Biosocial Education For All
Michael Bloomberg	City Leadership on Climate Change
Albina du Boisrouvray	Health Is Not Alone
Irina Bokova	Education First
Larry Brilliant	Pandemic's One-Two-Three Punch
Gro Harlem Bruntdland	Equality is the Future
Felipe Calderon	Prioritizing Health in Politics
Ray Chambers	Committing to Unbridled Collaboration
Margaret Chan	Climate's Big Health Warning
Helen Clark	Tackling Obesity and Overweight
Bill Clinton	Preventing Premature Deaths
Paul Collier	HIV Treatment, A Moral Duty
Francis S. Collins	The Power Of Science
Nigel Crisp	Whose Life Is It?
Sally C. Davies	The Drugs Don't Work
Mark Dybul	Vision 2020- and Beyond
Carissa F. Etienne	Achieving Social Equity
Paul Farmer	Healthcare Financing and Social Justice
Richard Feachem	A Global CDC and FDA
Harvey V. Fineberg	A Universal Flu Vaccine
Julio Frenk	The Power Of Knowledge
Thomas Frieden	Better Information Will Save Lives
Laurie Garrett	Communicable before Noncommunicable Diseases
Melinda Gates	Human-Centered Design
Amanda Glassman	A Data Revolution in Health
Lawrence Gostin	Imagining Global Health With Justice
Teguest Guerma	Putting People First
Angel Gurria	The Big Health Data Future
Jane Halton	Standing Up To Big Tobacco
Margaret Hamburg	Safe Food and Medical Products
Katharine Hayhoe	Climate Change Is Here
David L. Heymann	A Convenient Defense- Defining Affordability
Steven Hoffman	A Science of Global Strategy
Arianna Huffington	Time for Renewal
John Ioannidis	Reliable, Unbiased, Reproducible Evidence
Elton John	Love Is The Cure
Angelique Kidjo	Secondary Schooling for Girls
Jim Yong Kim	Getting Health Delivery Right
Anthony Lake	Equity in Child Survival
Alan Lopez	Ignorance about Causes of Death
Adetokunbo O. Lucas	Five Pillars of Wisdom
Graca Machel	Keeping the Promise to Children
Michael Marmot	Fairness and Health Equity
Anne Mills	From Hegemony to Partnership
Sania Nishtar	Fusion Fund for Health
Anders Nordstrom	Health and Not Health Care
Ngozi Okonjo-Iweala	Diet for a Healthy Future
Sean Penn	We're All In This Together
Navanethem Pillay	No Health without Rights
Peter Piot	No Magic Bullet
Thomas Pogge	The Health Impact Fund
Michael E. Porter	Value-Based Health-Care Delivery
Esther Duflo	Acknowledging Ignorance
K. Srinath Reddy	From Pulse to Planet
Judith Rodin	Universal Health Coverage
Simon Rushton	Who Will Lead?
Richard Sezibera	The Rwandan Consensus
Rajiv Shah	Ending Preventable Child Death
Michel Sidibe	Global Health Citizenship
Wole Soyinka	Harmonizing Health
Jonas Gahr Store	Public Health 2.0
Larry Summers	Investing In A Grand Convergence
Keizo Takemi	Health in a Multipolar World
