= 3 by 5 Initiative =

Initiative to provide treatment to 3 million HIV/AIDS patients by 2005

The 3 by 5 Initiative was an initiative of the World Health Organization (WHO) to provide antiretroviral treatment to patients with HIV/AIDS in low- and middle-income countries. The program lasted from December 2003 to December 2005, and the name "3 by 5" refers to the goal of treating 3 million people by 2005. The 3 by 5 Initiative is seen as the beginning of the scaling of antiretroviral treatments, and evaluations of the Initiative take this into account.

== Strategy ==
The 3 by 5 Initiative was guided by five "strategic pillars":

- global leadership, strong partnership and advocacy
- urgent, sustained country support
- simplified, standardized tools for delivering antiretroviral therapy
- effective, reliable supply of medicines and diagnostics
- rapidly identifying and reapplying new knowledge and successes

== Evaluation of the initiative ==
An evaluation team commissioned by the Canadian International Development Agency (CIDA) and WHO reviewed the 3 by 5 initiative between July 2005 and March 2006. The evaluation team published their report in March 2006, titled Progress on global access to HIV antiretroviral therapy: a report on "3 by 5" and beyond. It found that 1.3 million people were receiving antiretroviral treatment in the target countries by December 2005, up from 400,000 before the start of the initiative. The evaluation team also found that many of the worst-affected countries were still far from containing their AIDS crises. It also credits the 3 by 5 Initiative with establishing antiretroviral treatment as an essential public health intervention.

The evaluation team attributes some of the difficulties in achieving the goals of the Initiative to an initial lack of secured funding (resulting in delays) and an unstable management of the HIV/AIDS program (due to the high turnover rate of WHO directors).

The 3 by 5 Initiative has been criticized by Arthur J. Ammann for focusing only on treatment of HIV (instead of also focusing on testing and prevention), for the high costs of the program, and for being "top down" instead of allowing target countries to take charge of their own AIDS programs.

== See also ==
- Timeline of global health
- History of HIV/AIDS
