= World Summit for Children =

World Summit for Children Summit for Children Worldwide
- Date: September 29–30, 1990
- Cities: New York, USA
- Venues: United Nations
- Chair: UNICEF
- Website: UNICEF official site

The United Nations World Summit for Children was held in the United Nations Headquarters in New York City on 29–30 September 1990. The summit had the then-largest-ever gathering of heads of state and government to commit to a set of goals to improve the well-being of children worldwide by the year 2000. It was the first time a UN conference had set a broad agenda for a wide range of goals in health, education, nutrition and human rights.

The main result of the World Summit was the joint signing of a World Declaration on the Survival, Protection and Development of Children and a Plan of Action comprising a detailed set of child-related human development goals for the year 2000. The World Summit set the stage for a decade of high level commitment on issues concerning children around the world and it set the stage for a series of UN conferences throughout the 1990s on population, environment, food, human rights, social development and women's rights.

== Origin of project ==
The Summit was proposed in 1989 by Prime Minister Brian Mulroney of Canada, President Hosni Mubarak of Egypt, President Moussa Traoré of Mali, President Carlos Salinas de Gortari of Mexico, Prime Minister Benazir Bhutto of Pakistan, and Prime Minister Ingvar Carlsson of Sweden. These six leaders worked together "to bring attention and promote commitment, at the highest political level, to goals and strategies for ensuring the survival, protection and development of children as key elements in the socio-economic development of all countries and human society". The United Nations Secretary-General Javier Pérez de Cuéllar adopted the project and gave the Summit the support of the UNICEF and other UN organizations. A total 159 governments were invited to the event. In attendance were heads of state from 72 different countries, as well as representatives from 87 other nations.

The Summit agenda was highly endorsed by three main organizations- the World Health Assembly, Education for All (led by UNESCO) and the United Nations Children's Fund (UNICEF) Executive Board. UNICEF was the main contributor. Every year following the Summit, it conducted progress reports on the implementation of Summit goals and released them through its many publications.

The World Summit for Children was held at a moment when the world was just beginning to demonstrate united interest in children's survival and development. A year prior the Convention on the Rights of the Child was adopted. It is a human rights treaty focused directly on the rights of children. The document had entered into force just a couple of weeks before the Summit was held.

== Goals established ==
There were 27 total goals established. The main objective was to improve child health and survival. The goals can be divided into six categories: health, survival, women's health, nutrition, education and protection. These goals were put into action from 1990-2000. After the ten-year period, world leaders would meet again to review the progress made during the decade.

=== Health ===
There were nine health goals established.

1. Polio: global eradication by 2000
2. Neonatal tetanus: elimination by 1995
3. Deaths due to diarrhoea: 50 percent reduction
4. Vitamin A deficiency: virtual elimination by the year 2000
5. Iodine deficiency disorders (IDD): virtual elimination
6. Elimination of guinea-worm disease (Dracunculiasis) by 2000
7. Measles: reduction by 95 percent in measles deaths and 90 percent of measles cases by 1995
8. Anemia: reduction of iron deficiency Anemia in women by one-third
9. Routine immunization: maintenance of a high level of immunization coverage

=== Survival ===
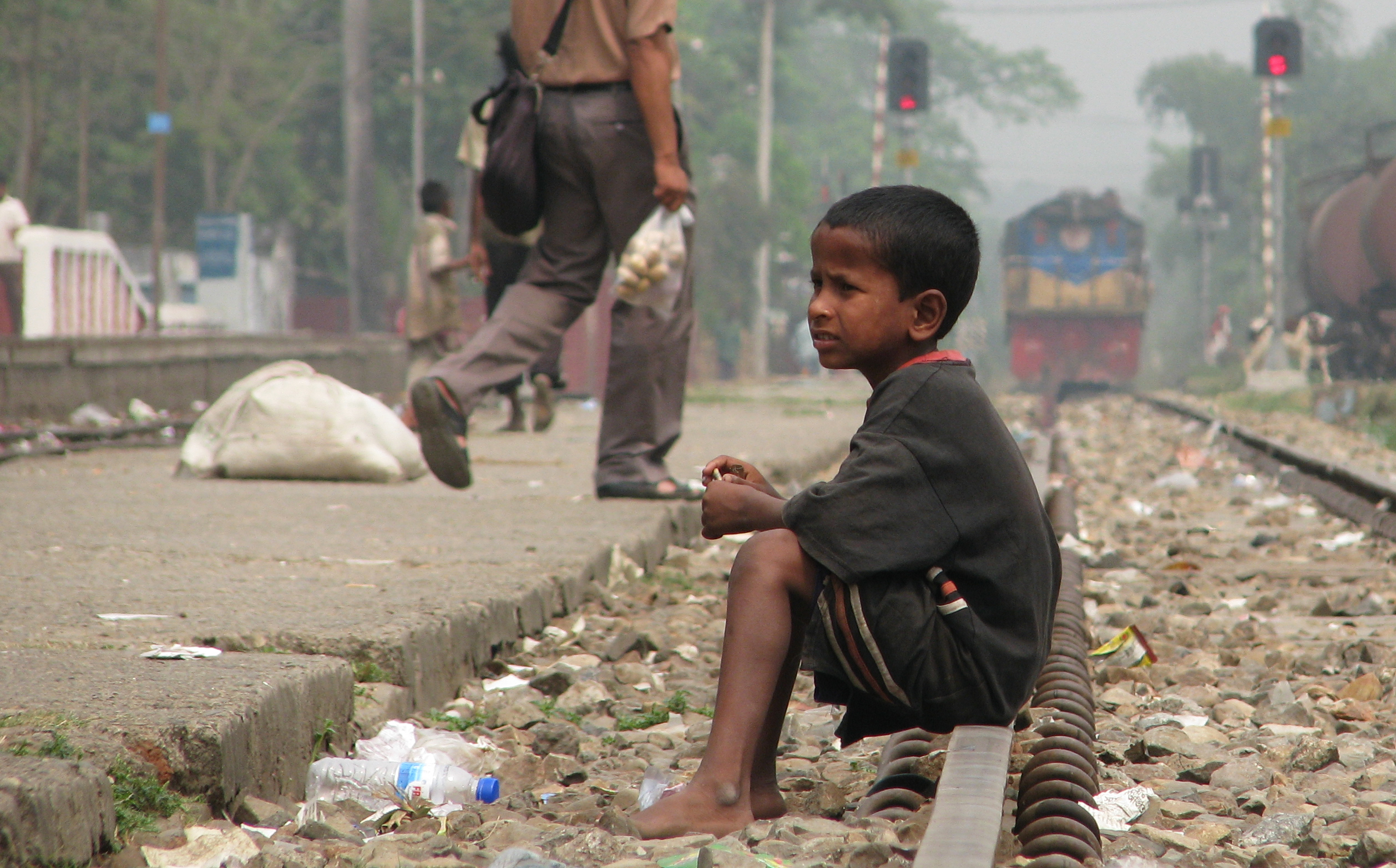
Street child in Bangladesh

1. Infant and under-5 mortality (U5MR): reduction by one third in infant mortality and U5MR
2. Household food security: dissemination of knowledge and supporting services to increase food production
3. Acute respiratory infections (Influenza-like illness): reduction of ARI deaths by one third in children under five

=== Women's health ===
1. Childbirth care: access by all pregnant women to prenatal care
2. Breastfeeding: empowerment of all women to breastfeed their children exclusively for four to six months and to continue breastfeeding, with complementary food, well into the second year of life
3. Childbirth care: access by all pregnant women to referral facilities for high-risk pregnancies and obstetric emergencies
4. Special attention to the health and nutrition of the female child and to pregnant and lactating women
5. Maternal mortality: reduction of the rate by half
6. Low birth-weight: reduction of the rate of low birth-weight to less than 10 percent

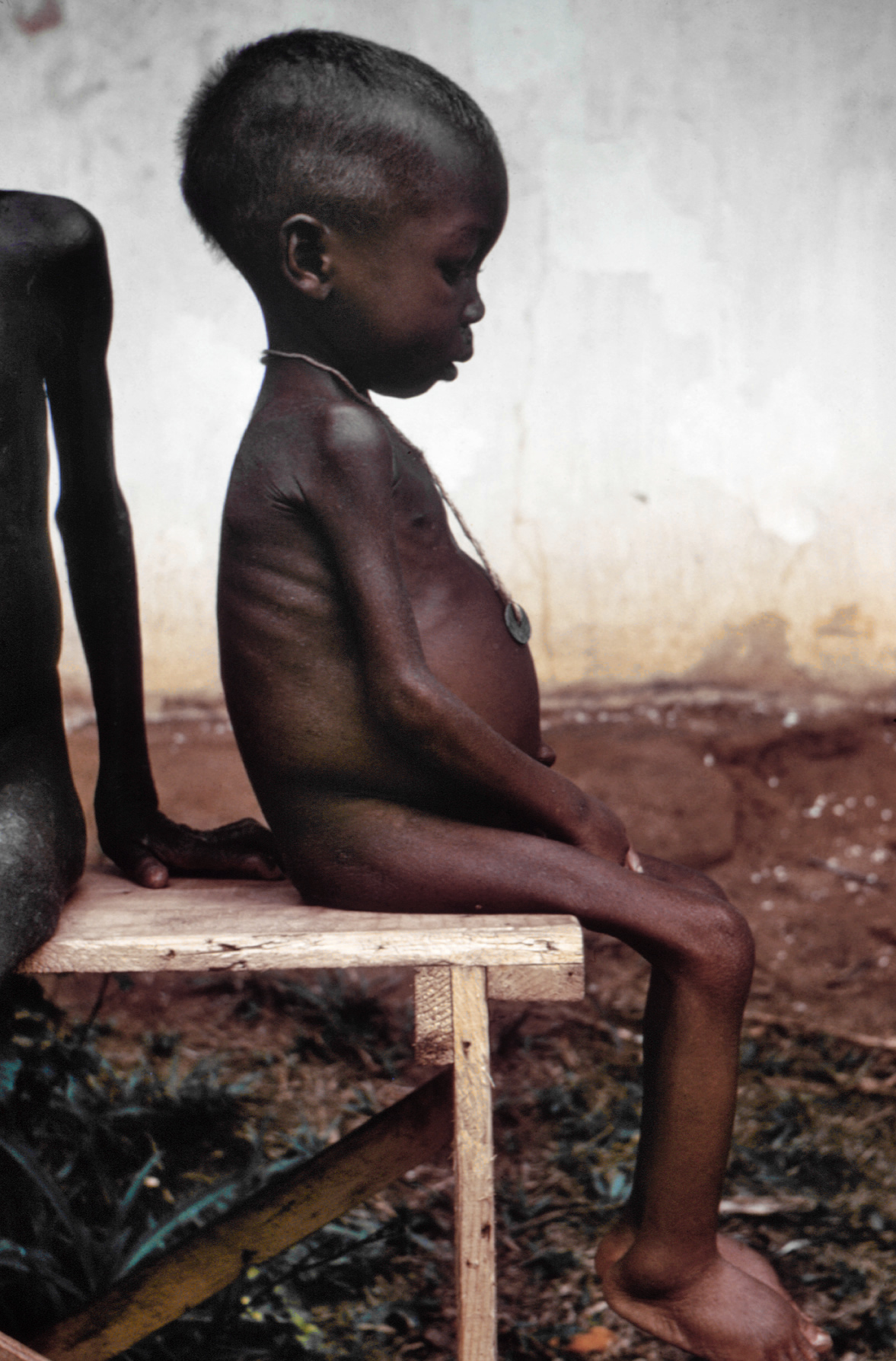
A girl during the Nigerian Civil War of the late 1960s. Pictures of the famine caused by Nigerian blockade garnered sympathy for the Biafrans worldwide.

=== Nutrition ===
1. Malnutrition: reduction of severe and moderate malnutrition among under-five children by half
2. Water: universal access to safe drinking water

=== Education ===
1. Family planning: access by all couples to information and services to prevent pregnancies that are too early, too closely spaced, too late, or too numerous
2. Knowledge skills and values required for better living: increased acquisition by individuals and families of knowledge, skills and values for better living
3. Universal access to basic education: achievement of primary education by at least 80% of primary school-age children
4. Universal access to education with an emphasis on primary education for girls and literacy training for women
5. Early childhood development (ECD): expansion of ECD activities, including appropriate low-cost family and community-based interventions

=== Protection ===
1. Improve protection of children in extremely difficult circumstances
2. Growth monitoring: growth promotion and regular growth monitoring among children to be institutionalized in all countries by the end of the 1990s

== Laws established ==
The high point of the Summit was the joint signing of the World Declaration on the Survival, Protection, and Development of Children and a Plan of Action on September 30, 1990. The World Declaration on the Survival, Protection, and Development of Children served as a written commitment to children worldwide. It summarizes the reason for the Summit and the goals established. The Plan of Action is a supplement to the World Declaration. It outlines how goals are to be met.

=== World declaration ===
The World Declaration of the Survival, Protection, and Development of Children is subdivided into five categories: The Challenge, The Opportunity, The Task, The Commitment, and The Next Step.

- The Challenge: To help countless children around the world who are exposed to dangers that hamper their growth and development. In particular those that are victims of poverty, malnutrition, war, and disease.
- The Opportunity: Declares that the fulfillment of the Summit goals will be an international co-operation, and leaders worldwide must implement the obligations agreed upon to on the Convention on the Rights of the Child. The Convention on the Rights of the Child was signed in 1989; it was the first international treaty to guarantee civil and political rights as well as economic, social, and cultural rights. The United States and South Sudan are the only countries who have not ratified the Convention.
- The Task and The Commitment: Both of these serve to further explain the specific goals of the Summit.
  - Improve Children's Health
  - Improve Prenatal Health
  - To strengthen the role and status of women
  - To provide educational opportunities
  - To ameliorate the lives of homeless, refugee, disabled, and abused children
  - To protect children from the dangers of war
  - To work for a global attack on poverty
- The Next Step: The adoption of The Plan of Action to specify how the World Declaration on the Survival, Protection, and Development of Children will be realized.

=== Plan of action ===
The Plan of Action is a framework for more specific national and international undertakings. It addresses every goal individually to ensure the implementation of the Declaration of the World Summit for Children. It also concentrates on the follow-up and monitoring of the progression towards accomplishing each goal. The primary responsibility for the implementation of all goals was given to National Governments. Each country agreed to develop strategies through National Programs of Action to make sure these 27 global goals could become national realities. A total of 155 countries developed National Programs of Action.

== Special session ==
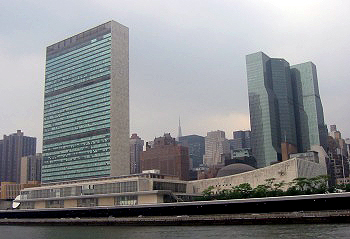
U. N. headquarters in New York City

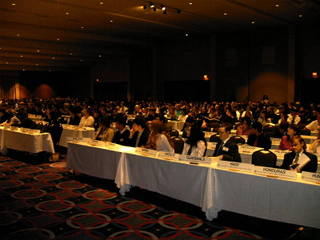
Children at The Special Session on Children

The Special Session on Children was a meeting the UN General Assembly held May 8–10, 2002. It was held to review the progress made for children in the decade since the 1990 World Summit for Children. It also served as a method to renew the commitments made in 1990, and to make a pledge for specific actions for the coming decade. In total about 70 Heads of State and/or Government attended the Session. Children from all around the world where invited to attend. They participated in numerous supporting events. One of the more important events was the Celebration of Leadership for Children held on May 9. The event encompassed a sense of unity and created a festive nature for the Session, but the real reason for the gathering was not forgotten.

The World Summit stands out from any other United Nations gathering because of its soundly set goals and its systematic follow up procedure. The Secretary-General’s report on children, titled "We the Children" uses data taken from 135 countries and is based on reviews conducted at the national level. It was the most comprehensive study of what was happening to the world’s children at that time. "We the Children" is a statistical representation of the minimal progress made in the decade. The report states, “The world has fallen short of achieving most of the goals of the World Summit for Children". Few of the goals established could be labeled as successes, others showed progress, but the majority were not met.

=== Success ===
- Polio: global eradication by 2000
- Neonatal tetanus: elimination by 1995
- Deaths due to diarrhea: 50 percent reduction
- Vitamin A deficiency: virtual elimination by the year 2000
- Iodine deficiency disorders (IDD): virtual elimination
- Elimination of guinea-worm disease(Dracunculiasis) by 2000

=== Some progress ===
- Infant and under-5 mortality: reduction by one third in infant mortality and Under-5 mortality
- Measles: reduction by 95 percent in measles deaths and 90 percent of measles cases by 1995 as a major step to global eradication
- Malnutrition: reduction of severe and moderate malnutrition among under-five children by half
- Breastfeeding: empowerment of all women to breastfeed their children exclusively for four to six months and to continue breastfeeding, with complementary food, well into the second year of life
- Low birth-weight: reduction of the rate of low birth-weight to less than 10%
- Family planning: access by all couples to information and services to prevent pregnancies that are too early, too closely spaced, too late or too numerous
- Childbirth care: access by all pregnant women to prenatal care
- Water: universal access to safe drinking water
- Universal access to basic education: achievement of primary education by at least 80% of primary school-age children
- Universal access to education with an emphasis on primary education for girls and literacy training for women
- Early childhood development (ECD): expansion of ECD activities, including appropriate low-cost family and community-based interventions
- Improve protection of children in extremely difficult circumstances

=== No progress ===
- Routine immunization: maintenance of a high level of immunization coverage
- Maternal mortality: reduction of the rate by half
- Anemia: reduction of iron deficiency Anemia in women by one-third

=== Limited data ===
- There was limited or inconclusive data on the remaining 6 goals

"We the Children" places the blame to meet goals on financial barriers. Critics note that in many United Nations conferences, goals are ever set but never met, and that commitments on paper are rarely translated into actions. The Canadian Medical Association Journal attributes the lack of progress to the fact that documents emerging from UN conferences are policy documents rather than legal instruments or binding treaties, but it also remarks that the Special Session on Children will set the direction for international policy with respect to children for the next decade.

== See also ==
- Child survival revolution
