= James P. Grant =

American politician

Jim Pineo Grant

Executive Director of UNICEF
- In office January 1980 – January 28, 1995
- Secretary General: Kurt Waldheim; Javier Pérez de Cuéllar; Boutros Boutros-Ghali
- Preceded by: Henry Labouisse
- Succeeded by: Richard Jolly (Acting)

Personal details
- Born: May 12, 1922; Beijing, Republic of China
- Died: January 28, 1995 (aged 72); Mount Kisco, New York, U.S.
- Political party: Democratic
- Education: University of California, Berkeley (BA); Harvard University (JD)

James Pineo Grant (May 12, 1922 – January 28, 1995) was an American diplomat and children's advocate. Grant served for 15 years (from January 1980 to January 1995) as the third executive director of the United Nations Children's Emergency Fund (UNICEF), with the rank of Under Secretary-General.

Grant was born at Peking Union Medical College Hospital in Beijing. He lived in China until the age of 15, where his father, John Black Grant, was the first professor of Public Health at the Rockefeller Foundation-funded Peking Union Medical College. Grant attended the University of California, Berkeley, graduating in 1943 in economics, and in 1951 graduated from Harvard Law School.

Grant began his international civil service in the late 1940s working in China with the United Nations Relief and Rehabilitation Administration.

In 1962, was named Deputy Assistant Secretary of State for Near East and South Asian Affairs and deputy director of the International Cooperation Administration, the precursor to the United States Agency for International Development. From 1964 until 1967 Grant served as the USAID Mission Director in Turkey. In 1967 he was appointed the Assistant Administrator of USAID for Southeast Asia, a position he held until 1969. After he left USAID in 1969 he formed the Overseas Development Council, becoming its president and CEO. Grant left the ODC after being appointed UNICEF executive director. He served in that position from January 1980 to January 1995. As Marcos Cueto mentioned in article, "Under Grant's dynamic leadership, UNICEF began to back away from a holistic approach to primary health care. Grant believed that international agencies had to do their best with finite resources and short-lived local political opportunities. This meant translating general goals into time-bound specific actions. A few years later, Grant organized a UNICEF book that proposed a "children's revolution" and explained the 4 inexpensive interventions contained in GOBI." On August 8, 1994, he was presented with the Presidential Medal of Freedom by President William Clinton.

Grant was diagnosed with cancer in May 1993, but continued to lead UNICEF until he resigned on January 23, 1995, and died a few days later, at age 72.

Nicholas D. Kristof wrote in 2008 that Grant, "a little-known American aid worker," had "probably saved more lives than were destroyed by Hitler, Mao, and Stalin combined" through his promotion of vaccinations and diarrhea treatments. Grant had been universally known within UN as a man who could not accept the undoable: he would be often found scribbling on a pad, laughing to himself, "It can be done! It can be done"

== Social Entrepreneurship ==
James P. Grant, during his years as deputy director of USAID had been an early backer of The Green Revolution, recognizing the role that a package of technical breakthroughs (improved seeds, fertilizer, irrigation, pesticides, mechanization) could collectively create; with The Green Revolution in reducing world hunger. In 1973, in his annual lecture at Johns Hopkins University's School of Public Health (personally special for him as his father had been in its first graduating class) Grant grasped the scientific breakthroughs that had come out of Carl Taylor's Narangwal research (childhood pneumonia, oral rehydration therapy, neonatal tetanus, family planning) and saw an immediate parallel to The Green Revolution, saying "we can now start to talk about a Child Survival Revolution!"

Grant continued in the years that followed to recognize this as a problem that he was very passionate to reduce when he read Jon Rohde's lecture, "Why the Other Half Dies." Rohde's lecture helped Grant realize that each year, "14 million children under the age of five died. And the great majority died at home from diarrhea, pneumonia, malnutrition, and immunizable diseases." What caught James P. Grant's attention was that most child deaths could be completely prevented in cheap and simple ways.

Grant's vision was that, "Morality must march with capacity." He was disgusted that very little had been done to help prevent countless children from dying from very preventable causes, so he took it upon himself and the organization which he was head of, UNICEF, to, "[conceive] and [lead] a worldwide campaign to make simple, low-cost health solutions available to children everywhere."

In 1982, Grant and UNICEF launched the child survival revolution and unveiled a simple but effective strategy for reducing child fatality. His strategy was known as GOBI-FFF:

G for growth monitoring to detect undernutrition in small children, O for oral rehydration therapy to treat childhood diarrhea, B to encourage breastfeeding (which had declined precipitously due to working mothers and the marketing of infant formula), and I for immunization against the six basic childhood diseases: tuberculosis, polio, diphtheria, tetanus, whooping cough, and measles. (They added two Fs: food supplements and family planning; and, later, a third: female education.)

It is estimated that the child vaccination increased from 20 to 80 percent worldwide in 1990 because of Grant's child survival revolution.

It is also estimated that simple procedures prevented deaths from immunizable diseases and severe dehydration for about 4 million children in 1992.

Countless people were saved from a life of disabilities such as polio (An estimated 3 million people saved), blindness from lack of Vitamin A (An estimated million people saved), and brain damaged caused from iodine deficiencies (An estimated 10 million people saved).

It was because of James Grant and his vision, passion and resourcefulness, along with the strength of his conviction and his will to make a difference that these changes were able to take place.

== Sources ==
- The White House - Remarks by the President in Medal of Freedom Ceremony

Diplomatic posts
Preceded by Henry Labouisse	Executive Director of UNICEF; 1980–1995	Succeeded by Richard Jolly; Acting
