= List of diseases eliminated from the United States =

This is a list of diseases known (or declared) to have been eliminated from the United States, either permanently or at one time. ("Elimination" is the preferred term for "regional eradication" of a disease; the term "eradication" is reserved for the reduction of an infectious disease's global prevalence to zero.) Eliminated diseases can often be re-imported without additional endemic cases. Although no fixed rule always applies, many infectious diseases (e.g., measles) are considered eliminated when no cases have been reported to public health authorities for at least 12 months.

== The eliminated diseases ==
Fig. 1: Diseases eliminated from the United States of America
Disease	Date last endemic case	Date last imported case	Notes	References
Yellow fever	1905	1996	Last epidemic 1905, New Orleans; last imported case 1996 (prior to that 1924)	
Smallpox	1934	1949	After widespread national vaccination efforts; routine vaccination of American children discontinued in 1973; declared eradicated worldwide in 1980	
Malaria	1951	2024	See National Malaria Eradication Program	
Poliomyelitis	1979	2022	After widespread vaccination efforts; see Poliomyelitis eradication	
Measles	2026	2022	Regarded by CDC as eradicated in 2000; however, see Measles resurgence in the United States	
Rubella	2004		After widespread national vaccination efforts	
Diphtheria		2012	After widespread national vaccination efforts	

== Possible future eliminations ==
Various public health projects are going on, with a goal of eliminating diseases from the country. Several infectious diseases in the United States, not on the above list, are considered close to elimination (98–99% reductions): e.g., Hemophilus influenzae, mumps, rubella and congenital rubella. Other disease pathogens (e.g., those of anthrax, rabies and tetanus) have been almost eliminated from humans in the US, but remain as hazards in the environment, so cannot accurately be described as eliminated. The stated goal of "eradication" of hookworm from the southeast US (1915–1920) was not achieved, although the hookworm-infection rate of that region did drop by more than half.

- In 1954, Congressional funds were first approved for a Cooperative State-Federal Brucellosis Eradication Program to eliminate the disease from the country. (Brucellosis is a problem mainly in livestock. In 1956, 124,000 affected herds were found by testing in the US. By 1992, the number had dropped to 700 herds and the number of affected, domestic herds has declined to single digits since then.)
- The CDC Division of Tuberculosis Elimination has a goal of eliminating tuberculosis from the United States by minimizing the likelihood of Mycobacterium tuberculosis transmission, which will prevent the occurrence of new cases.
- The Oral Rabies Vaccine (ORV) Program has a goal of preventing the spread of raccoon-variant rabies and eventually eliminating it from the United States.
- An effort has been made for several years to eliminate syphilis from the US. The rate of infection decreased through the 1990s, and in 2000, it was the lowest since reporting began in 1941, leading the US Surgeon General to issue a plan to eliminate the disease from the country. It has been staging a comeback, however, increasing each year since 2001.
