= CMR =

CMR can refer to:

== Businesses ==
- Cash Money Records, an American record label and a subsidiary of Universal Music Group
- California Management Review, a management research journal published by the University of California
- Century Media Records, an independent rock and roll record label
- Canadian Multicultural Radio or CJSA-FM (CMR Diversity FM 101.3), a Toronto radio station
- CMR (motorcycle company), also known as CMCR (Centre de montage et de récupération), a French motorcycle manufacturer
- Country Music Radio, a defunct European radio station
- Cross Movement Records, Christian hip-hop record label
- CMR Falabella (Crédito Multi-Rotativo Falabella), a credit card issued by S.A.C.I. Falabella

== Concepts ==
- Carcinogenic, Mutagenic or toxic to Reproduction (CMR substances), a concept in the Registration, Evaluation, Authorisation and Restriction of Chemicals law of the European Union
- Civil-military relations, the relationship between civil society and the military organization established to protect it

== Entertainment ==
- Chad, Matt & Rob, a group of filmmakers known for their prank videos and Choose Your Own Adventure style short films that blend comedy with horror, adventure and sci-fi

== Laws and treaties ==
- CMR Convention, from the French Convention relative au contrat de transport international de marchandises par route. In English, the United Nations Convention on the Contract for the International Carriage of Goods by Road
- Code of Massachusetts Regulations, a compilation of regulations adopted by government agencies in Massachusetts, United States

== Medicine ==
- Comprehensive medication review, a type of medication therapy management program
- Cardiac magnetic resonance imaging, a medical imaging technology for non-invasive assessment of the function and structure of the cardiovascular system.

== Military organizations ==
- Canadian Mounted Rifles (disambiguation), several cavalry and infantry units in the Boer War and the World War I
- Chief Makhanda Regiment, an infantry regiment of the South African Army

== Places ==
- CMR, a country code for Cameroon
- CMR, a code for Colmar Airport, an airport near Colmar, Haut-Rhin department, France

== Religious institutions ==
- Congregation of the Mother of the Redeemer, a Vietnamese Roman Catholic religious order

== Schools and research facilities ==
- Charles M. Russell High School, a secondary school in Great Falls, Montana
- Chemistry and Metallurgy Research Facility, a nuclear facility at Los Alamos National Laboratory
- Le Collège militaire royal de Saint-Jean, a military academy in Saint-Jean-sur-Richelieu, Quebec

== Science and technology ==
- Carbon-13 NMR, the application of NMR spectroscopy to carbon-13
- Cardiovascular MRI, magnetic resonance imaging for assessing the function and structure of the heart and cardiovascular system
- Cellular mobile radiophone, a cellphone (technically speaking)
- Chayes-Machta-Redner representation, a term in condensed matter physics
- Clear motion rate, an LCD screen technology by Samsung for fast-moving images
- Clinical Microbiology Reviews, an academic journal covering microbiology and immunology
- Colossal magnetoresistance, an electrical phenomenon
- Common-mode rejection ratio, a measure of the capability of an instrument to reject a signal that is common to both input leads
- Conventional magnetic recording, a technology for data recording on hard disks

== Transportation ==
- Cooma Monaro Railway, a heritage railway in New South Wales, Australia

== Video games ==
- Colin McRae Rally, a racing game
