= Jilt =

Jilt or may refer to:

- Jilț, a tributary of the river Jiu in Romania
- Jilț Coal Mine, an open-pit mine in Romania
- The Jilt, a 1922 American drama film directed by Irving Cummings
- A B-girl (archaic term for a bargirl) - see Jilt shop
