= Boston Directory =

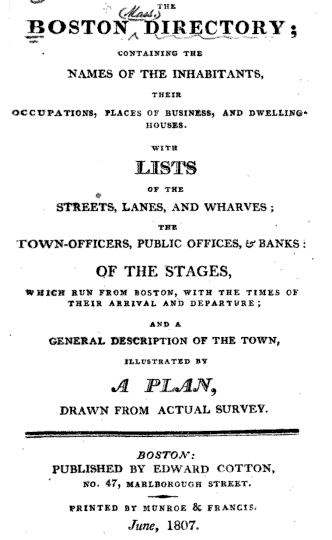
1807 Boston Directory title page

The Boston Directory of Boston, Massachusetts, was first published in 1789. It contained "a list of the merchants, mechanics, traders, and others, of the town of Boston; in order to enable strangers to find the residence of any person." Also included were listings for public officials, doctors, bank directors, and firemen. The directory was issued annually after 1825; previously it had appeared irregularly.

The number of listings in each directory reflected fluctuations in the population size of Boston. In 1789, the directory included some 1,474 listings; by 1875, there were 126,769.

Publishers included John Norman (1789); John West (1796-1803); Edward Cotton (1805-1818); Charles Stimpson (1820-1846); George Adams (1846-1857); Adams, Sampson & Co. (1858-1865); Sampson, Davenport & Co. (1865-1884); Sampson, Murdock & Co. (1885-1903); Sampson & Murdock Co. (1904-ca.1930); R.L. Polk & Co. (1944-ca.1980).

== Boston Directories ==
=== 18th century ===
Title	Publisher	Year	Google Books	HathiTrust	Internet Archive	Other
Boston Directory		1789			via Internet Archive	
Boston Directory		1796	reprint via Google Books, p. 215-302			via Boston Athenæum
Boston Directory		1798				via Boston Athenæum

=== 19th century ===
==== 1800-1829 ====
Title	Publisher	Year	Google Books	HathiTrust	Internet Archive	Other
Boston Directory		1800				via Boston Athenæum
Boston Directory	John West	1803				via Boston Athenæum
Boston Directory	Edward Cotton	1805		via HathiTrust	via Internet Archive	
Boston Directory	Edward Cotton	1806				via Boston Athenæum
Boston Directory	Edward Cotton	1807		via HathiTrust		
Boston Directory	Edward Cotton	1809				via Boston Athenæum
Boston Directory	Edward Cotton	1810				via Boston Athenæum
Boston Directory	Edward Cotton	1813				via Boston Athenæum
Boston Directory	Edward Cotton	1816				via Boston Athenæum
Boston Directory	Edward Cotton	1818				via Boston Athenæum
Boston Directory	Frost and Stimpson	1820		via HathiTrust		
Boston Directory	Frost and Stimpson	1821				via Boston Athenæum
Boston Directory	Frost and Stimpson	1822				via Boston Athenæum
Boston Directory	Frost and Stimpson	1823	via Google Books	via HathiTrust		
Boston Directory	Frost and Stimpson	1825		via HathiTrust	via Internet Archive	
Boston Directory	Frost and Stimpson	1826				via Boston Athenæum
Boston Directory	Hunt, Stimpson, and Frost	1827				via Boston Athenæum
Boston Directory	Hunt and Stimpson	1828				via Boston Athenæum
Boston Directory	Charles Stimpson, Jr.	1829				via Boston Athenæum

==== 1830-1849 ====
Title	Publisher	Year	Google Books	HathiTrust	Internet Archive	Other
Boston Directory		1830				via Boston Athenæum
Stimpson's Boston Directory	Stimpson & Clapp	1831			via Internet Archive	
Stimpson's Boston Directory	Stimpson & Clapp	1832	via Google Books	via HathiTrust		
Stimpson's Boston Directory	Stimpson & Clapp	1833				via Boston Athenæum
Stimpson's Boston Directory	Stimpson & Clapp	1834		via HathiTrust	via Internet Archive	
Stimpson's Boston Directory	Stimpson & Clapp	1835			via Internet Archive	
Stimpson's Boston Directory	Stimpson & Clapp	1836		via HathiTrust	via Internet Archive	
Stimpson's Boston Directory	Stimpson & Clapp	1837				via Boston Athenæum
Stimpson's Boston Directory	Stimpson & Clapp	1838				via Boston Athenæum
Stimpson's Boston Directory	Stimpson & Clapp	1839				via Boston Athenæum
Stimpson's Boston Directory	Stimpson & Clapp	1840				via Boston Athenæum
Stimpson's Boston Directory	Stimpson & Clapp	1841				via Boston Athenæum
Stimpson's Boston Directory	Stimpson & Clapp	1842				via Boston Athenæum
Stimpson's Boston Directory	Stimpson & Clapp	1843				via Boston Athenæum
Stimpson's Boston Directory	Stimpson & Clapp	1844				via Boston Athenæum
Stimpson's Boston Directory	Stimpson & Clapp	1845				via Boston Athenæum via Tufts University
Stimpson's Boston Directory	Stimpson & Clapp	1846				via Boston Athenæum
Adams's New Directory of the City of Boston	George Adams	1846-47				via Boston Athenæum
Adams's Boston Directory	French and Stimpson	1847-48				via Boston Athenæum
Boston Directory	French and Stimpson	1848-49		via HathiTrust	via Internet Archive	
Boston Directory	George Adams	1849-50		via HathiTrust	via Internet Archive	

==== 1850-1869 ====
Title	Publisher	Year	Google Books	HathiTrust	Internet Archive	Other
Directory of the City of Boston	George Adams	1850	via Google Books	via HathiTrust		
Boston Directory	George Adams	1851	via Google Books via Google Books via Google Books	via HathiTrust		
Boston Directory	George Adams	1852	via Google Books			
Boston Directory	George Adams	1853		via HathiTrust		via Boston Athenæum
Boston Directory	George Adams	1854		via HathiTrust		via Boston Athenæum
Boston Directory	George Adams	1855	via Google Books	via HathiTrust		via Boston Athenæum via Tufts University
Boston Directory	George Adams	1856	via Google Books	via HathiTrust		
Boston Directory	George Adams	1857	via Google Books	via HathiTrust		
Boston Directory	Adams, Sampson, & Co.	1858	via Google Books	via HathiTrust		
Boston Directory	Adams, Sampson, & Co.	1859		via HathiTrust		
Boston Directory	Adams, Sampson, & Co.	1860		via HathiTrust		via Boston Athenæum
Boston Directory	Adams, Sampson, & Co.	1861	via Google Books	via HathiTrust		via Boston Athenaeum
Boston Directory	Adams, Sampson, & Co.	1862	via Google Books	via HathiTrust		via Boston Athenæum
Boston Directory	Adams, Sampson, & Co.	1863		via HathiTrust		via Boston Athenæum
Boston Directory	Adams, Sampson, & Co.	1864	via Google Books	via HathiTrust		
Boston Directory	Adams, Sampson, & Co.	1865		via HathiTrust		via Boston Athenæum via Tufts University
Boston Directory	Sampson, Davenport, & Co.	1866	via Google Books	via HathiTrust		via Boston Athenæum
Boston Directory	Sampson, Davenport, & Co.	1867		via HathiTrust		via Boston Athenæum
Boston Directory	Sampson, Davenport, & Co.	1868	via Google Books	via HathiTrust		
Boston Directory	Sampson, Davenport, & Co.	1869	via Google Books	via HathiTrust		via Boston Athenæum

==== 1870-1889 ====
Title	Publisher	Year	Google Books	HathiTrust	Internet Archive	Other
Boston Directory	Sampson, Davenport, & Co.	1870	via Google Books	via HathiTrust		via Boston Athenæum via Tufts University
Boston Directory	Sampson, Davenport, & Co.	1871		via HathiTrust		via Boston Athenæum
Boston Commercial Directory	Wentworth & Co.	1871	via Google Books			
Boston Directory	Sampson, Davenport, & Co.	1872		via HathiTrust		December supplement via Boston Athenæum via Tufts University
Boston Directory	Sampson, Davenport, & Co.	1873	via Google Books via Google Books via Google Books	via HathiTrust		November, December supplements via Boston Athenæum
Boston Directory	Sampson, Davenport, & Co.	1874		via HathiTrust		via Boston Athenæum
Boston Directory	Sampson, Davenport, & Co.	1875	via Google Books	via HathiTrust		via Boston Athenæum via Tufts University
Boston Directory	Sampson, Davenport, & Co.	1876		via HathiTrust		via Boston Athenæum
Boston Directory	Sampson, Davenport, & Co.	1877	via Google Books	via HathiTrust		via Boston Athenæum
Boston Directory	Sampson, Davenport, & Co.	1878		via HathiTrust		via Boston Athenæum
Boston Directory	Sampson, Davenport, & Co.	1879		via HathiTrust		via Boston Athenæum
Boston Directory	Sampson, Davenport, & Co.	1880				via Boston Athenæum
Boston Directory	Sampson, Davenport, & Co.	1881				via Boston Athenæum
Boston Directory	Sampson, Davenport, & Co.	1882	via Google Books	via HathiTrust		via Boston Athenæum
Boston Directory	Sampson, Davenport, & Co.	1883				via Boston Athenæum
Boston Directory	Sampson, Davenport, & Co.	1884				via Boston Athenæum
Boston Directory	Sampson, Murdock, & Co.	1885				via Boston Athenæum via Tufts University
Boston Directory	Sampson, Murdock, & Co.	1886	via Google Books			via Boston Athenæum
Boston Directory	Sampson, Murdock, & Co.	1887	via Google Books			via Boston Athenæum
Boston Directory	Sampson, Murdock, & Co.	1888				via Boston Athenæum
Boston Directory	Sampson, Murdock, & Co.	1889				via Boston Athenæum

==== 1890-1899 ====
Title	Publisher	Year	Google Books	HathiTrust	Internet Archive	Other
Boston Directory	Sampson, Murdock, & Co.	1890				via Boston Athenæum
Boston Directory	Sampson, Murdock, & Co.	1891				via Boston Athenæum
Boston Directory	Sampson, Murdock, & Co.	1892				via Boston Athenæum
Boston Directory	Sampson, Murdock, & Co.	1893				via Boston Athenæum
Boston Directory	Sampson, Murdock, & Co.	1894				via Boston Athenæum
Boston Directory	Sampson, Murdock, & Co.	1895				via Boston Athenæum
Boston Directory	Sampson, Murdock, & Co.	1896	via Google Books			via Boston Athenæum
Boston Directory	Sampson, Murdock, & Co.	1897				via Boston Athenæum
Boston Directory	Sampson, Murdock, & Co.	1898				via Boston Athenæum
Boston Directory	Sampson, Murdock, & Co.	1899				via Boston Athenæum

=== 20th century ===
==== 1900-1949 ====
Title	Publisher	Year	Google Books	HathiTrust	Internet Archive	Other
Boston Directory	Sampson, Murdock, & Co.	1900				via Boston Athenæum
Boston Directory	Sampson, Murdock, & Co.	1905		via HathiTrust		via Tufts University
Boston Directory	Sampson & Murdock Co.	1916			via Internet Archive	
Boston Register and Business Directory	Sampson & Murdock Co.	1922			via Internet Archive	
Boston Directory	Sampson & Murdock Co.	1925				via Tufts University

==== 1950-1999 ====
Title	Publisher	Year	Google Books	HathiTrust	Internet Archive	Other
Boston City Directory	R.L. Polk & Co.	1955			via Internet Archive	
Boston City Directory	R.L. Polk & Co.	1956			via Internet Archive	
Boston City Directory	R.L. Polk & Co.	1959			via Internet Archive	
Boston City Directory	R.L. Polk & Co.	1961			v.1, v.2 via Internet Archive	
Boston City Directory	R.L. Polk & Co.	1962			via Internet Archive	
Boston City Directory	R.L. Polk & Co.	1965			via Internet Archive	
Boston City Directory	R.L. Polk & Co.	1966			via Internet Archive	
Boston City Directory	R.L. Polk & Co.	1969			via Internet Archive	
Boston City Directory	R.L. Polk & Co.	1970			via Internet Archive	

== See also ==
- Boston Almanac and Business Directory
- Massachusetts Register
