= Law of Massachusetts =

The law of Massachusetts consists of several levels, including constitutional, statutory, regulatory, case law, and local ordinances. The General Laws of Massachusetts form the general statutory law.

== Sources of law ==
The Constitution of Massachusetts is the foremost source of state law. Legislation is enacted by the General Court, published in the Acts and Resolves of Massachusetts, and codified in the General Laws of Massachusetts. State agency regulations (sometimes called administrative law) are published in the Massachusetts Register and codified in the Code of Massachusetts Regulations. The legal system is based on common law, which is interpreted by case law through the decisions of the Massachusetts Supreme Judicial Court, the Massachusetts Appeals Court, and the Appellate Divisions of the Massachusetts District Court and the Boston Municipal Court departments, which are published in the Massachusetts Reports, Massachusetts Appeals Court Reports, and Massachusetts Appellate Division Reports, respectively. Cities and towns may also promulgate bylaws and local ordinances.

=== Constitution ===
The foremost source of state law is the Constitution of Massachusetts. The Massachusetts Constitution in turn is subordinate to the Constitution of the United States, which is the supreme law of the land.

=== Legislation ===
Pursuant to the state constitution, the Massachusetts General Court has enacted legislation. Its session laws are published in the official Acts and Resolves of Massachusetts. They are in turn codified as the General Laws of Massachusetts.

=== Regulations ===
Pursuant to certain statutes, state agencies have promulgated regulations, which along with administrative orders and decisions form part of the body of administrative law. The Massachusetts Register is the bi-weekly publication that contains new and amended (permanent and emergency) regulations, notices of hearings and comment periods, notices of public interest, executive orders by the governor, attorney general opinions, a cumulative table of changes to regulations published during the current calendar year, and a list of acts and resolves passed by the General Court. The Code of Massachusetts Regulations (CMR) is the canonical compilation of regulations promulgated by state agencies pursuant to the Administrative Procedures Act and is updated through the Massachusetts Register. Both the Code of Massachusetts Regulations and Massachusetts Register are published by the secretary of the Commonwealth.

=== Case law ===
The legal system of Massachusetts is based on the common law. Like all U.S. states except Louisiana, Massachusetts has a reception statute providing for the "reception" of English law. All statutes, regulations, and ordinances are subject to judicial review. Pursuant to common law tradition, the courts of Massachusetts have developed a large body of case law through the decisions of the Massachusetts Supreme Judicial Court and Massachusetts Appeals Court. The decisions of the Massachusetts Supreme Judicial Court, the Massachusetts Appeals Court, and the Appellate Divisions of the Massachusetts District Court and the Boston Municipal Court departments, which are published in the Massachusetts Reports, Massachusetts Appeals Court Reports, and Massachusetts Appellate Division Reports, respectively. The Massachusetts Law Reporter publishes decisions from the Massachusetts Superior Court. MassCourts is the case management system used by the courts.

== See also ==
=== Topics ===
- Alcohol laws of Massachusetts
- Cannabis in Massachusetts
- Capital punishment in Massachusetts
- Elder law (Massachusetts)
- Gun laws in Massachusetts
- LGBT rights in Massachusetts

=== Other ===
- Politics of Massachusetts
- Law enforcement in Massachusetts
- Crime in Massachusetts
- Law of the United States
