= Fish Street =

Fish Street may refer to:

- St Aldate's, Oxford
- North Street (Boston)
