= General Laws of Massachusetts =

Codification of many of the statutes of the Commonwealth of Massachusetts

The Massachusetts General Laws is a codification of many of the statutes of the Commonwealth of Massachusetts. The Commonwealth's laws are promulgated by an elected bicameral ("two-chamber") legislative body, the Massachusetts General Court. The resulting laws—both Session Laws and General Laws—together make up the statutory law of the Commonwealth.

Each bill that becomes law is given a chapter number, assigned sequentially in the chronological order of its adoption – these are the Session Laws. The official publication of Session Laws for any given year is called the Acts and Resolves of Massachusetts, and is compiled and published annually by the Secretary of the Commonwealth. The vast majority of Session Laws are Acts. A Resolve is most typically used to establish a special commission to investigate a certain issue.

General Laws are Session Laws (or sections of Session Laws) that are permanent in nature and of general application. They are codified according to subject matter into a multi-volume publication entitled the General Laws of Massachusetts. The General Court amends the General Laws by enacting Session Laws which may effect modifications and additions to the General Laws.

Not all Session Laws, which apply equally to codified law, are entered into the General Laws. Session Laws that are not codified into the General Laws are called Special Acts, and might include matters affecting an individual or a particular city or town.

In legal citations, Massachusetts General Laws are abbreviated as M.G.L. or G.L. Provisions in the General Laws are identified by chapter and section, e.g., Mass. Gen. L. c. 93A, § 9. Chapters are grouped topically by part and title.

The parts of the General Laws are as follows:

Part	Description	Chapters
I	Administration of Government	1–182
II	Real and Personal Property and Domestic Relations	183–210
III	Courts, Judicial Officers, and Proceedings in Civil Cases	211–262
IV	Crimes, Punishments, and Proceedings in Criminal Cases	263–280
V	The General Laws and Express Repeal of Certain Acts and Resolves	281–282

The unannotated official version of the General Laws is published every two years. Two widely used annotated collections are Massachusetts General Laws Annotated (M.G.L.A.) from West Publishing, and Annotated Laws of Massachusetts (A.L.M.) published by LexisNexis. Both are available as bound collections and by subscription online.

The General Laws replaced the General Statutes, which are abbreviated as G.S. when cited in lists of local-option statutes accepted by cities and towns.

The Massachusetts Constitution expressly grants to the Massachusetts Supreme Judicial Court the power to review and interpret these laws.

== See also ==
- Code of Massachusetts Regulations
- Law of Massachusetts
- List of U.S. state statutory codes
