= Ratier =

Aircraft components manufacturer

Ratier-Figeac is an aircraft components manufacturer in Figeac, France.

From 1926 until 1930 it also built a car with a 746 cc overhead camshaft engine.

From 1959 until 1962 Ratier made motorcycles, having taken over the motorcycle business of the Centre d'Études de Moteurs à Explosion et à Combustion (CEMEC). The engines were flat-twins derived from Second World War BMW designs.

== History ==
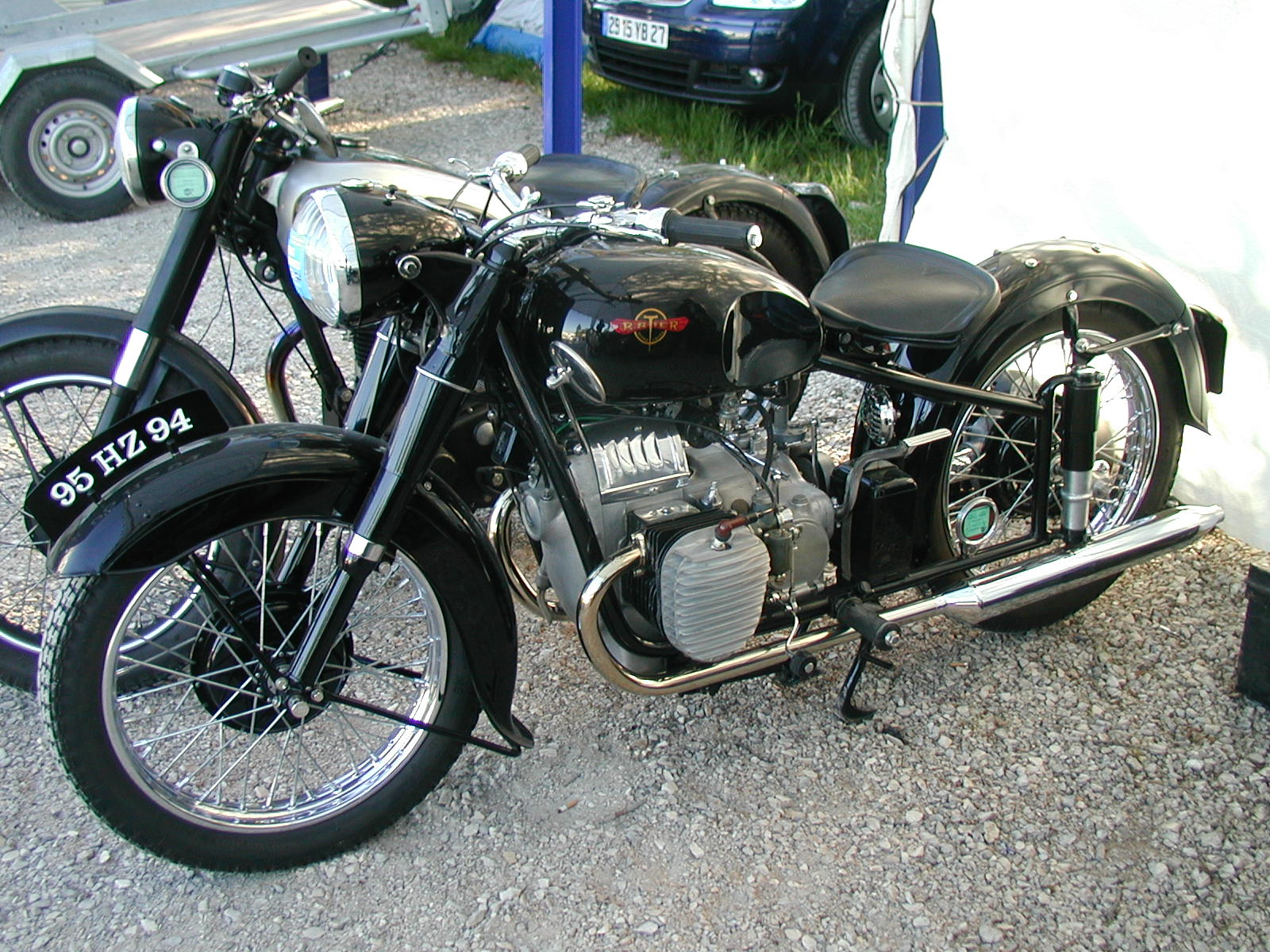
Ratier motorcycle

Ratier was originally a joinery firm. By the outbreak of the first world war, the company was specializing in propeller blades for the aircraft of the French Air Force. Afterwards it produced for the French mail service Aéropostale all the way through its heyday of the 1930s when the service broke many flight records. The factory was originally in Malakoff and then transferred to Montrouge. Much of its workload consisted of the contract work it received from Citroën to produce the Citroenette, a child's pedal-car. Paulin Ratier fabricated a prototype propeller-car which never made it into production.

The company produced a rally-car which went on to win many races, such as the Bol d'or race, during a time when it was raced by cars and motorcycles. The factory at Figeac produced bicycles during World War II. It also produced aircraft parts for the German War machine and in January 1944 the Maquis, along with other French resistance groups, launched a secret attack on the factory and caused considerable damage.

After World War II, France needed motorcycles for police and army forces. The BMW patents and BMW Wehrmacht motorcycles and sidecar combinations were considered legitimate war spoils. The French army started a semiprivate business known as CMR (Centre de Montage et de Réparation) to refurb existing German motorcycles seized partly in France, partly in the French occupied zone of Germany, build a stock of spares and reverse-engineer missing parts. On this basis, chief engineer Jacques Dormoy started improving the product, sharing many common features with the BMW brand. The 750cc L7 had side valves (L stands for Lateral, meaning side valves), but the later 600cc C6S (C stands for Culbuté meaning rocker operated Over Head Valves). At some point CMR was in financial troubles and was relaunched as CEMEC (Centre d'Etudes de Moteurs à Combustion et Explosion) and its operations were devolved to the non-propeller branch of Ratier called RAM (Ratier Aviation et Marine) headquartered in Montrouge and production was restarted under the Ratier brand .

General Charles de Gaulle equipped his presidential escort with Ratier motorcycles. While the L7 was considered an obsolete design, prompting French Gendarmerie to buy German made post war BMW's instead, the C6S was on par with the BMW R60 performance-wise, the only difference being the use of a flector (rubber coupling) instead of a universal joint between gearbox and rear wheel transmission shaft. While there were indeed a few civilian customers most of the production was absorbed by police and army forces, much like the Danish Nimbus motorcycles. There were only 1,200 motorcycles produced after the government failed to renew its contract with the company.

Today in Figeac, the company produces aircraft parts, in particular for Airbus.

== Timeline ==
1904 : Ratier was created by the joiner, Paulin Ratier, in order to fabricate wooden plane-propellers.

1914-1918 : War increases demand and production times are tightened. 1917 : Ratier opens a new factory at Figeac in an old saw-mill. Ratier chose Figeac for the abundant wood-supplies in the region, necessary for propeller production.

1919-1929 : After the war, demand falls and Ratier must diversify into other products. Ratier begins to produce toys, electrical appliances and telephones. At the same time, metal propellers come onto the scene and Ratier patents a variable pitch propeller, putting the company among the world's top producers.

1939 : Ratier outfits 90% of the French Air Force, holds 63 world records, 32 foreign licenses, and has branches in Algeria, Switzerland and in Morocco. The company employs 500 persons.

1941 : Aircraft demand plummets and the company resorts to producing bicycles.

1949-1950 : The company experiences a crisis from lack of demand. The workforce falls below 100.

1951-1961 : Exceptional business opportunities allow the company to diversify and multiply its workforce by 10. G. Forest takes over the company and opens a tool-die factory at Capdenac (today's Forest-Line factory), not far from Figeac.

1961 : Momentum builds in propeller production with Transall and l’Atlantic in particular, and Ratier becomes the flight equipment manufacturer for the Caravelle

1968 : Ratier produces propellers and fan-lift engines.

1970 : Ratier begins working with Airbus to fill orders.

1980 : Ratier produces composite propellers in conjunction with Hamilton Sundstrand and sees its projects multiply with Airbus, Eurocopter, Bombardier, ATR...

1990 : Hamilton Sundstrand brings in new capital to Ratier-Figeac with 20.5% of its parts.

1998 : Hamilton Sundstrand acquires 100% of its capital

2001 : Ratier-Figeac receives the order to produce the elevator for the Airbus A380

2003 : Ratier-Figeac obtains the contract to produce the propellers for the A400M.

2007 : Ratier-Figeac is the only propeller producer for the Hamilton Sundstrand group. It will be entirely incorporated by 2008.
