= Old Feather Store =

Shop in Boston, Massachusetts, United States

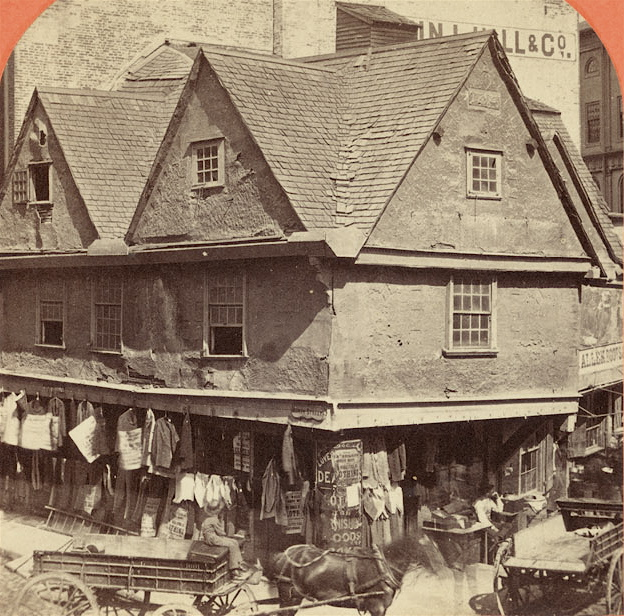
- 19th century
- Interactive map of the Old Feather Store area
- Alternative names: Old Cocked Hat

General information
- Location: Dock Square, Boston, Massachusetts
- Coordinates: 42°21′36.52″N 71°3′24.64″W
- Completed: 1680 (346 years ago)
- Demolished: 1860 (166 years ago)

Technical details
- Floor count: 2.5

The Old Feather Store was a shop located at Dock Square and Ann Street in Boston, Massachusetts. It was also called the Old Cocked Hat. Built in 1680 by Thomas Stanbury, it was demolished in 1860.

== Brief history ==
Through the years, the building had several owners and was used for varying commercial purposes. William Antram made hats, c. 1708; John Greenleaf ran an apothecary, 1766–1778; Samuel Wallis sold goods from West India, c. 1789; Samuel Richards sold hardware, c. 1789, as did Jonathan Phillips, c. 1803. Beginning in 1806, Daniel Pomeroy, John K. Simpson, Daniel P. Simpson, and William B. Simpson sold feathers. Charles Lovejoy sold clothes, c. 1806. William Tileston conducted business in the indigo trade, c. 1809.

Its timber-frame architecture featured multi-level gables, and facades embedded with glass. A contemporary observer described its appearance in the mid-19th century, prior to its demolition:

The outside of the building was covered with a strong, and, as time has proved, durable cement, in which was observable coarse gravel and broken glass, the latter consisting of fragments of dark-colored junk bottles. At the upper part of the principle gable on the Dock square front the date of the time of erecting the building, 1680, was distinctly impressed into the rough-cast cement in Arabic figures, together with various ornamental devices.

The "cement" material was called "roughcast" and was a material popular in England, used to cover the exterior of buildings. Roughcast was a suggested building covering after the great Boston fire of 1679, as it was less likely to catch fire than clapboards, which were used on many buildings due to their lower cost and the lack of a lime source in New England.

== Gallery ==
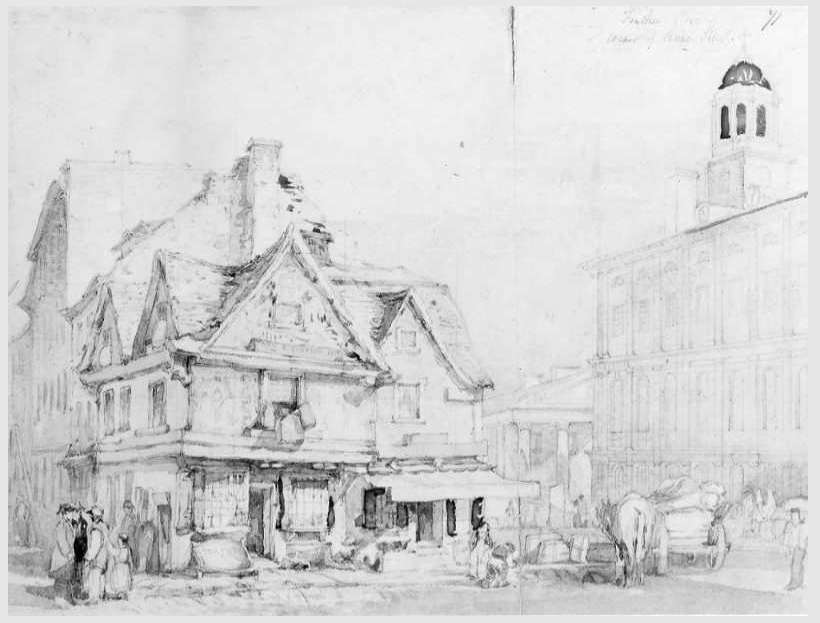
Drawing by unknown artist, 1839

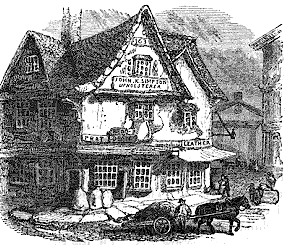
From Buckingham's America, 1841

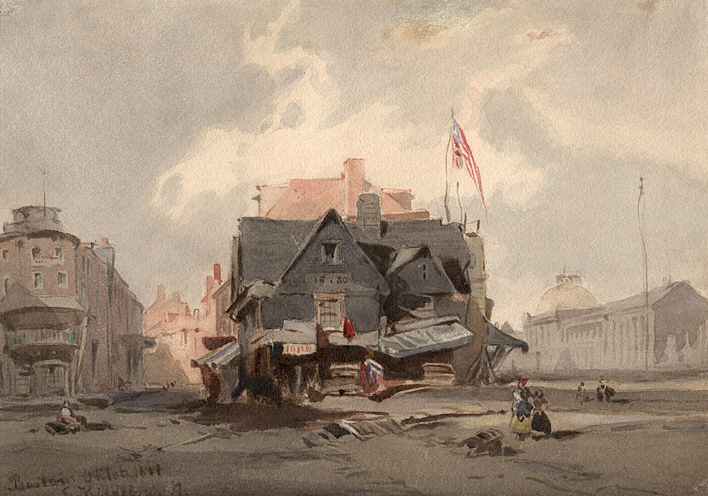
Painting by Eduard Hildebrandt, 1844

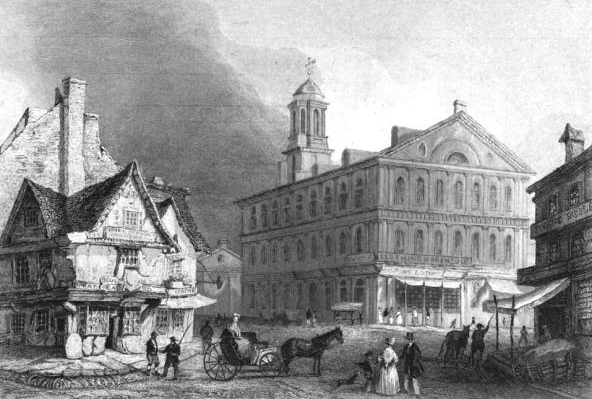
Proximity to Faneuil Hall, 1845

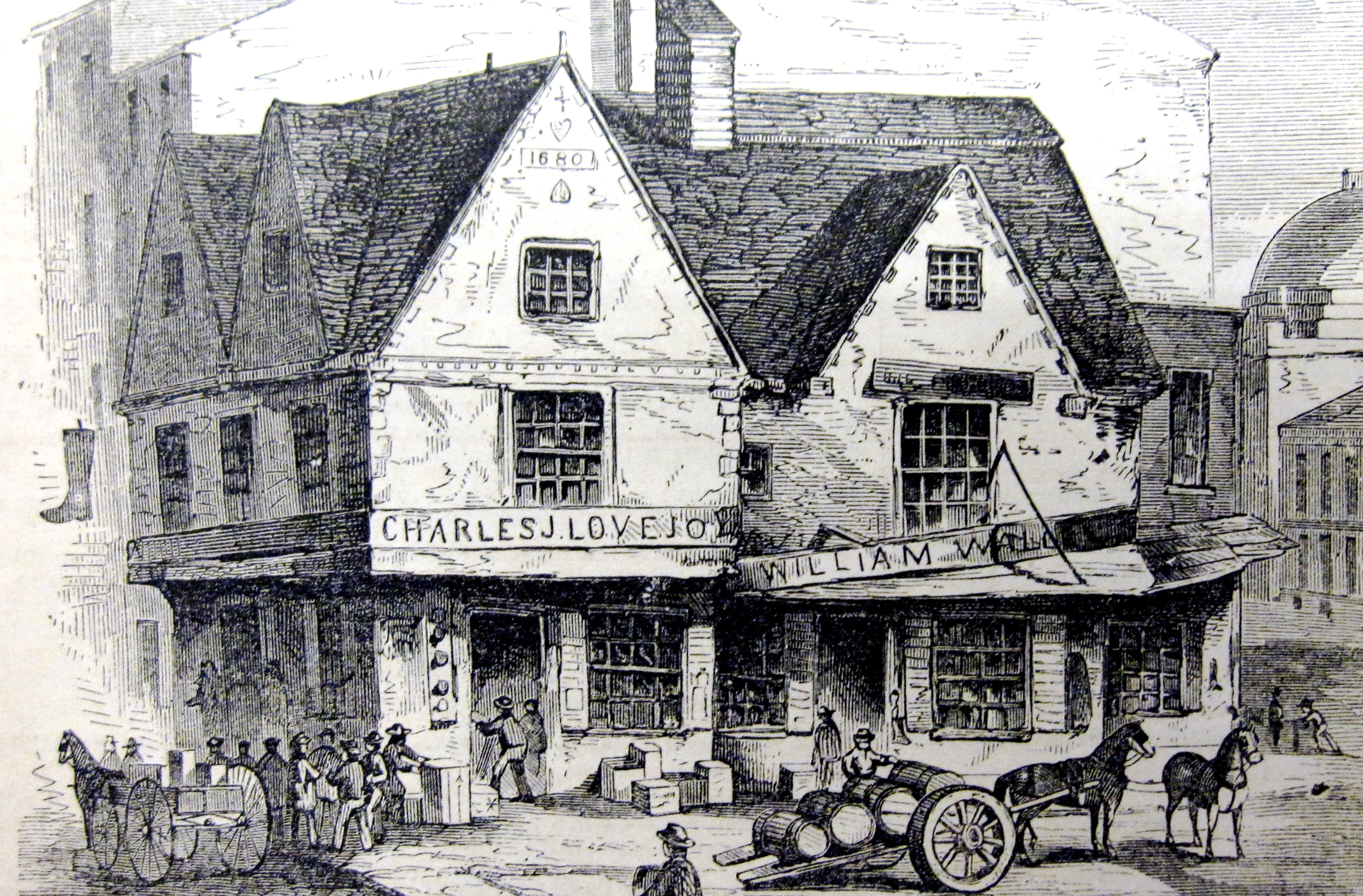
From Ballou's Pictorial, 1855

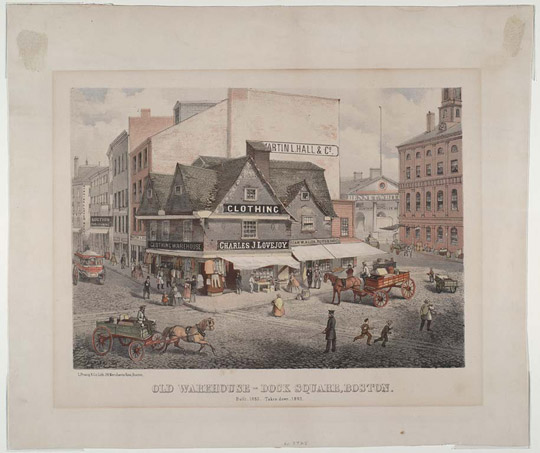
Print by Louis Prang & Co., 1860

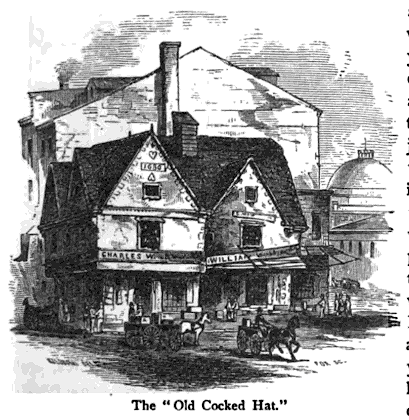
From Our Young Folks, 1873

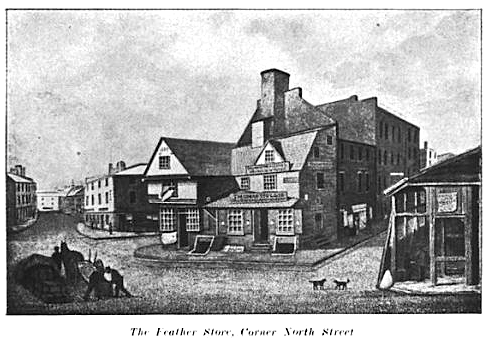
From Walks & Talks About Historic Boston, 1917
