= Alcohol laws of Massachusetts =

Location of Massachusetts

The serving of alcohol in the Commonwealth of Massachusetts is governed by the Alcoholic Beverages Control Commission (ABCC), which is responsible for issuing licenses and permits for all manufacturers, wholesalers and importers, out-of-state suppliers, brokers, salespeople, warehouses, planes, trains, ships, ship chandlers and vehicles transporting alcoholic beverages.

== Drinking age ==
Beginning just after the repeal of prohibition by the 21st Amendment on Dec. 5, 1933, the minimum drinking age in Massachusetts was set at age 17. Sometime between this date and April 13, 1973, the Massachusetts drinking age was raised to 21. Then, following the July 1, 1971 passage of the 26th Amendment (which lowered the voting age from 21 to 18 years of age), on April 13, 1972, governor Francis M. Sargent (following suit with 29 other governors) signed a bill lowering the Massachusetts drinking age from 21 to 18. The effective date of the new law was April 1, 1973. On February 16, 1979, the State Senate voted to raise the Massachusetts minimum drinking age from 18 to 20. The vote for final approval was 29 to 3. On December 4, 1984, governor Michael S. Dukakis signed a bill raising the drinking age from 20 to 21 in Massachusetts. This bill was in response to the National Minimum Drinking Age Act which would reduce federal highway funding by 10% for any state that did not adopt a drinking age of 21. Those under 21 can, however, consume alcoholic beverages provided by their parents or grandparents on private premises.

Establishments accepting, in good faith, the following as proof of age are protected if underage patrons are served accidentally:

- A Massachusetts Driver's License
- A Massachusetts Liquor Identification Card
- A Massachusetts Identification Card
- A Passport Issued by the United States or a government that is officially recognized by the United States
- A Passport Card for a Passport issued by the United States
- A US Military Identification Card
- Valid Driver’s License issued by another state; and
- Global Entry Card issued by United States Customs and Border Protection.

== Sale of alcohol ==
The colonial Sunday Blue Laws in Massachusetts eased in the 21st century. Before legislative changes in 2004 and 2014, the sale of alcohol for off premises consumption (in a licensed liquor store for spirits other than beer and wine) was allowed from 8 AM to 11 PM Monday through Saturday and 10 AM to 11 PM on Sundays. The sale of alcohol for on premises consumption (for all types) was allowed from 8 AM to 2 AM Monday through Saturday and 10 AM to 2 AM on Sundays.

== Transportation of alcohol ==
Individuals can transport alcohol without a license, up to but not exceeding, twenty gallons of malt beverages, three gallons of any other alcoholic beverage, or one gallon of alcohol at a single time. People under 21 years of age may not knowingly drive a car with alcohol inside unless they are accompanied by their legal guardian. This also means a person under the age of 21 cannot drive a vehicle with alcohol inside of the vehicle even if it belongs to a person over the age of 21 who is also inside the vehicle. Violators can be fined and/or have their driver's license suspended for three months.

== Drunk driving ==
Driving under the influence of alcohol in Massachusetts is a crime that is punishable by a fine and/or imprisonment. Massachusetts' maximum blood alcohol level is 0.08% and 0.02% if the driver is under 21 years of age. Operating under the influence penalties can vary depending on prior OUI offenses.

	Fine	Jail	Driver's License Suspension
1st Offense	$500–$5,000	None - 2½ years	1 year
2nd Offense	$1,000 - $10,000	30 days - 2½ years	2 years
3rd Offense (felony)	$1,000 - $15,000	150 days - 5 years	8 years
4th Offense (felony)	$1,500 - $25,000	1 – 5 years	10 years
5th Offense (felony)	$20,000 - $50,000	2 – 5 years	Lifetime

== Happy hour ban ==
Bars and restaurants in Massachusetts are prohibited from offering discounts on alcoholic beverages; this includes a total ban on happy hour promotions. Establishments are not permitted to offer a drink special for a short time, even for a day; prices must remain the same throughout the calendar week.

The ban on happy hour promotions came into effect in December 1984, following a series of happy hour-related drunk driving crashes, as part of a broader push to reduce drunk driving. It was supported by Mothers Against Drunk Driving and state officials, including Governor Michael Dukakis. Multiple attempts to repeal the ban have failed.

== Social host law ==
The host of a party can be held liable for a guest who causes injury to others if it is proved that the host knew or should have known that the guest was intoxicated but continued to allow the guest to drink alcoholic beverages.

== Restaurant liquor license quotas ==
A quota system for liquor licenses held by restaurants was set by state law in 1933. Cities and towns must appeal to the legislature to increase the number of local licenses. In some cases the licenses granted are non-transferable and cannot be sold.

== See also ==
- Law of Massachusetts
- Sumptuary law
