= List of shop signs in Boston in the 18th century =

This is a list of shop signs in Boston, Massachusetts, in the 18th century.

== A ==
- Sign of Admiral Vernon, King Street
- Sign of the Anchor

== B ==
- Sign of the Barber's Poll, Long Wharf
- Sign of the Basket of Lemons, Middle St.
- Sign of the Bellows, Ann Street
- Sign of the Bible, Cornhill
- Bible and Crown, Dock Square
- Bible and Heart, Cornhill
- Sign of the Bible and Three Crowns, Ann St.
- Sign of the Black and White Horse
- Sign of the Black Boy and But, Cornhill
- Sign of the Black Horse
- Sign of the Blue Ball, Union St.
- Sign of the Blue Boar
- Blue Dog, Wing's Lane
- Blue Dog & Rainbow, Cambridge St.
- Blue Glove, Union St.
- Sign of the Blue Horse, Cornhill
- Sign of the Boot, Marlborough Street
- Sign of the Boys and Bullock's Head, Water St.
- Sign of the Brazen Head, Cornhill
- Sign of the Breeches and Gloves, Ann St.
- Sign of the Buck, Marlborough St.
- Sign of the Buck and Glove, Cornhill
- Sign of the Bull
- Sign of the Bunch of Grapes, King St.

== C ==
- Sign of the Case of Draws, North Street
- Sign of the Chest of Draws, "near the New North Meeting House"
- Sign of the Chest of Drawers, Middle Street
- Sign of the Chest of Drawers and Cabinet, Middle St.
- Sign of the Coat and Stay
- Sign of the Cock, Wing's Lane
- Sign of the Cornfields, Union St.
- Cromwell's Head, School Street
- Sign of the Crown
- Sign of the Crown and Comb, Queen St.
- Sign of the Crown and Cross, Fish Street
- Sign of the Crown and Razor
- Sign of the Crown and Sceptre, Back Street
- Sign of the Cross, Ann St.
- Sign of the Cross Guns, Fish St.

== D ==
- Sign of the Dog and Pot, Ann St.
- Sign of the Dolphin, Fish St.
- Sign of the Drum, Back Street
- Sign of the Drum and Chairs

== E ==
- Sign of the Eagle, Newbury Street
- Sign of the Elephant, King St.
- Sign of the Engine, Pond-Lane

== F ==
- Faust's Statue, Newbury St.
- Five Sugar Loaves, Fish St.
- Sign of the Flower-Pot, Back St.
- Sign of the Four Sugar Loaves, Long Wharf
- Franklin's Head, Court St.

== G ==
- Sign of General Warren, Wing's Lane
- Sign of the Goat, King St.
- Sign of the Golden Ball, Merchant's Row
- Sign of the Golden Cock
- Sign of the Golden Eagle, Dock Square
- Sign of the Golden Fleece, King St.
- Sign of the Golden Key, Ann St.
- Sign of the Good Samaritan
- Sign of the Grand Turk, Newbury St.
- Green Canister and Two Sugar Loaves, Marlborough St.
- Sign of the Green Dragon, Union St.
- Sign of the Green Wigg

== H ==
- Sign of the Half Moon, Newbury St.
- Sign of the Hand and Beam, Middle St.
- Sign of the Hat, Cornhill
- Sign of the Hat & Hand, Cornhill
- Sign of the Hatt and Helmet
- Sign of the Hawk, Summer St.
- Sign of the Heart and Crown, Cornhill
- Sign of the Hoop Petticoat, "over against the north side of the Town House"

== K ==
- Sign of the King's Arms

== L ==
- Sign of the Lamb
- Sign of the Leopard, Ann St.
- Sign of the Leopard, Union St.
- Sign of the Light-House
- Sign of the Lion, Newbury St.
- Lion and Bell, Marlborough St.
- Sign of the Looking-Glass, Union St.
- Sign of the Lyon's Head and Crown, Fish St.

== O ==
- Sign of the Orange Tree

== P ==
- Sign of the Painter's Arms, Queen St.
- Sign of the Pine Tree and Two Sugar Loaves, King St.
- Sign of the Punch-Bowl, Dock Square

== R ==
- Sign of the Rainbow & Dove, Marlborough St.
- Sign of the Red Cross
- Sign of the Red Cross & Crown
- Sign of the Red Horse
- Sign of the Red Lyon, Wood Lane
- Sign of the Roe-Buck, Fish Lane
- Rose and Crown, Union St.
- Sign of the Royal-Exchange, King St.

== S ==
- Sign of the Salutation
- Sign of the Schooner, Fish St.
- Sign of the Ship, Long Wharf
- Sign of the Ship, Fish St.
- Sign of the Ship and Launch, King St.
- Sign of the Six Sugar Loaves, Union St.
- Sign of the Skales and Weights, "alley near Governours Dock"
- Sign of the Sloop, Anne Street
- Spectacles
- Sign of the Spring Clock & Watches, "near the draw-bridge in Anne Street"
- Sign of the Star, Hanover St.
- Sign of the Stationer's Arms
- Sign of the Stays
- Sign of the Sun, Draw-Bridge St.
- Sign of the Swan, Orange Street

== T ==
- Sign of the Tea-Kettle, South-End
- Sign of the Thistle & Crown, Wing's Lane
- Sign of the Three Coaches, Quaker Lane
- Sign of the Three Doves
- Sign of the Three Golden Doves, Marlboro St.
- Sign of the Three Horse-Shoes
- Sign of the Three-Kings, Cornhill
- Sign of the Three Nuns, Cornhill
- Sign of the Three Nuns and Comb, Cornhill
- Sign of the Three Pine Trees, State St.
- Sign of the Three Shuttles, Long Lane
- Sign of the Three Sugar Loaves, King St.
- Sign of the Three Sugar Loaves and Canister, King St.
- Sign of the Two Boys and Ox's Head and Horns, Water St.
- Sign of the Two Sugar Loaves, Cornhill
- Two Sugar Loaves, Fleet St.
- Sign of the Tun and Bacchus, King St.
- Sign of the Turks Head

== U ==
- Sign of the Unicorn, Cornhill
- Sign of the Unicorn and Mortar, Marlborough St.

== W ==
- Sign of the Walnut Tree, Milk Street
- Sign of the Whale Fishery, Union St.
- Sign of the Wheat-Sheafe, Wing's Lane
- Sign of the White Horse
- Sign of the White Wigg, Fish St.

== Y ==
- Sign of the Yankee Hero, Wing's Lane
