= Boston Almanac =

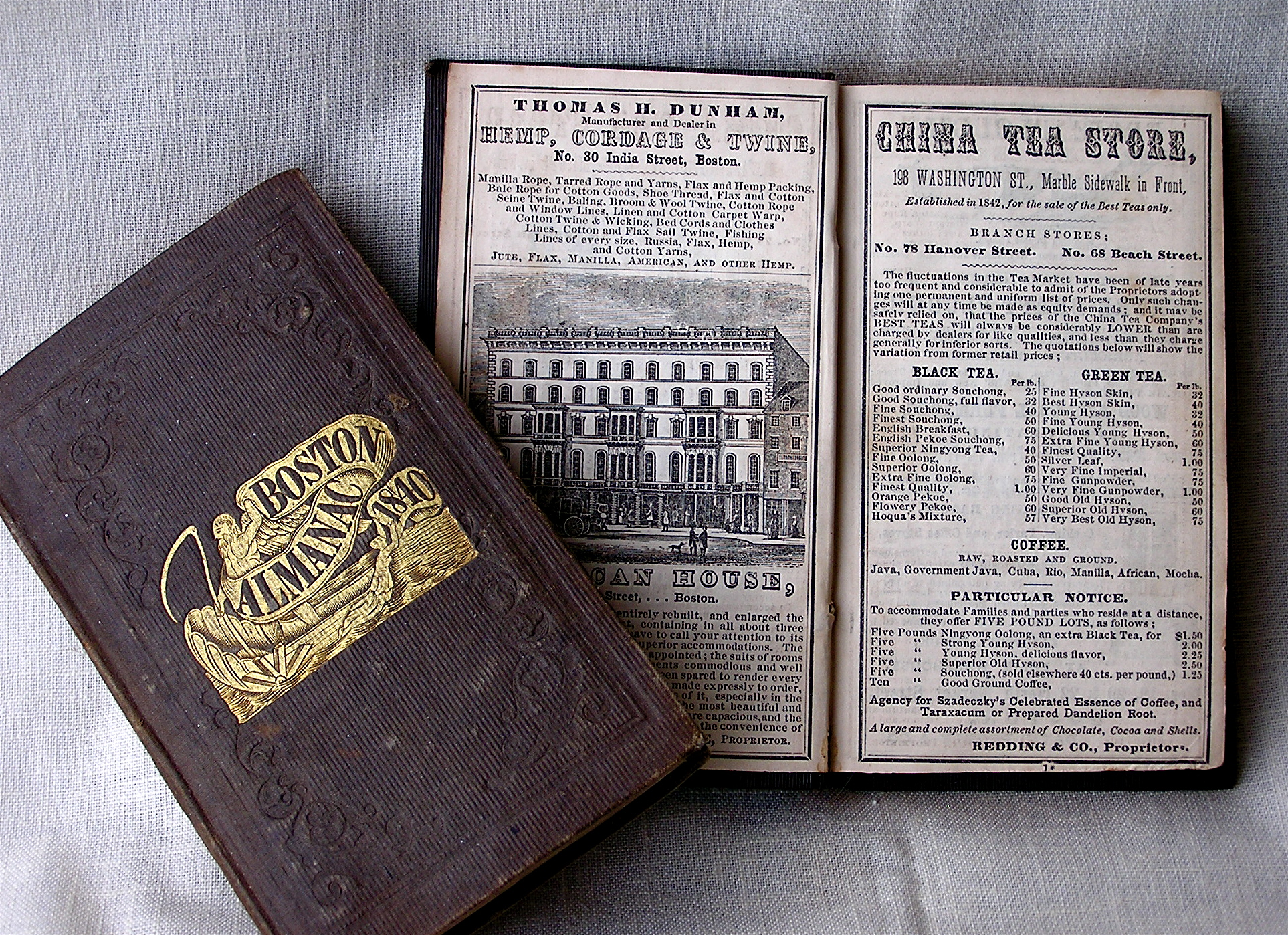
Boston almanacs 1840

The Boston Almanac was an almanac and business directory in 19th century Boston, Massachusetts published by Samuel N. Dickinson. Its offices were destroyed in the Great Boston Fire of 1872. The first almanac was published in 1836, and continued annually until at least 1894. Just about all editions contained a chronology of major events in Boston for the previous year or two years. Each almanac contained business listings, advertisements, and often city and/or state department information. Railroad, omnibus, and horse car companies were usually listed in a separate section. Some volumes highlighted famous buildings or places (such as Mount Auburn Cemetery).

== See also ==
- Boston Directory
