= Merchants Row (Boston) =

Street in Boston, Massachusetts

Coordinates: 42°21′34.18″N 71°3′20.55″W

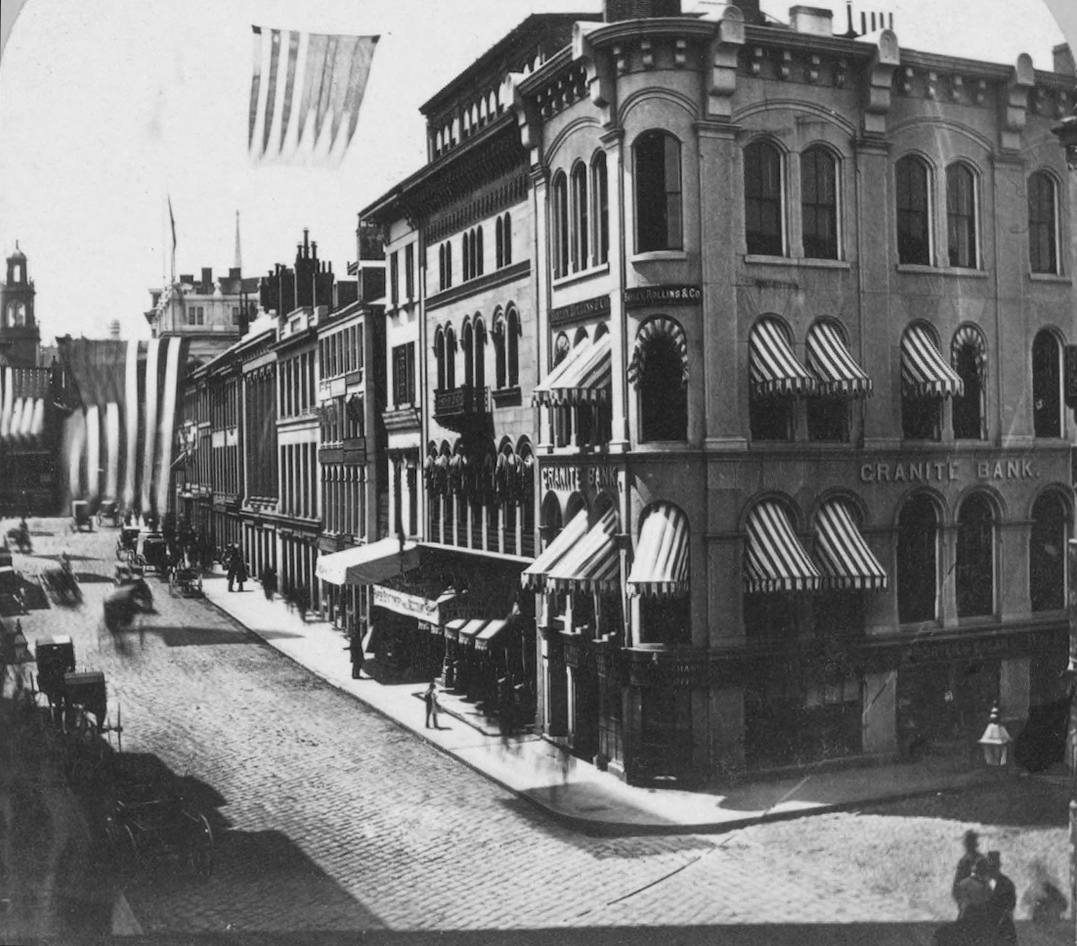
Corner of Merchants Row and State Street, Boston, 19th-century (Old State House at left)

Merchants Row in Boston, Massachusetts, is a short street extending from State Street to Faneuil Hall Square in the Financial District. Since the 17th century, it has been a place of commercial activity. It sits close to Long Wharf and Dock Square, hubs of shipping and trade through the 19th century. Portions of the street were formerly known as Swing-Bridge Lane, Fish Lane, and Roebuck Passage.

== History ==
=== 17th century ===
"On the west side of Merchants' Row, about midway from State Street to Faneuil Hall, was the first house of entertainment in Boston. It was kept by Samuel Cole in 1634."

=== 18th century ===
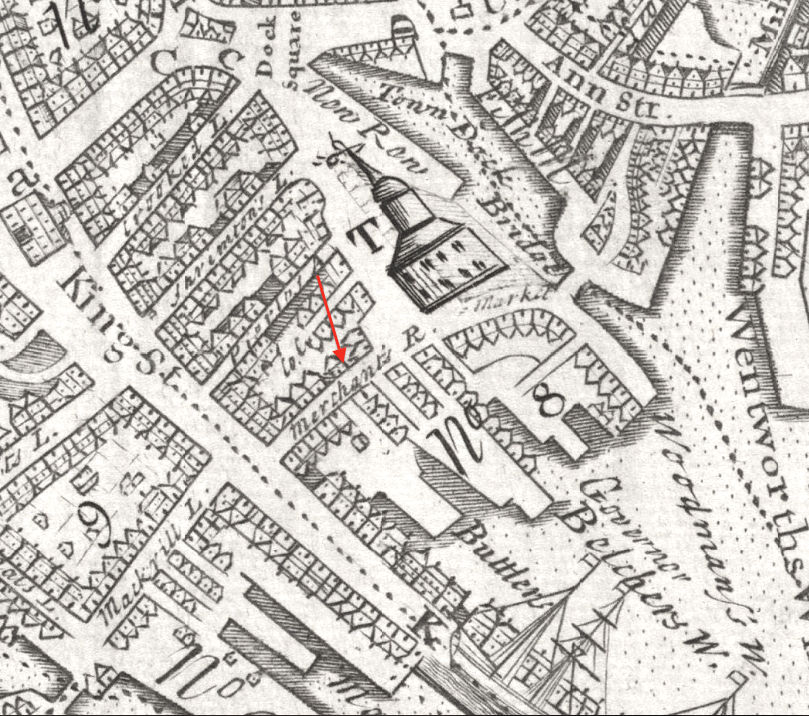
Detail of 1743 map of Boston, showing Merchants Row at the waterfront

In the 18th century, "many of Boston's best-connected importers set up shop" on Merchants Row. Andrew Faneuil (uncle of Peter Faneuil) owned a warehouse there around 1732;." and in the 1730s merchant Charles Apthorp had a "prime storefront location."

Slave trading took place on Merchants Row, as it did elsewhere in the town. For example, in 1731 Charles Apthorp advertised "a parcel of likely negroes of both sexes, just imported in the sloop Speedwell, William Dickinson master, lying and the upper end of the Long Wharffe ... to be sold by Charles Apthorp at his warehouse in Merchants Row."

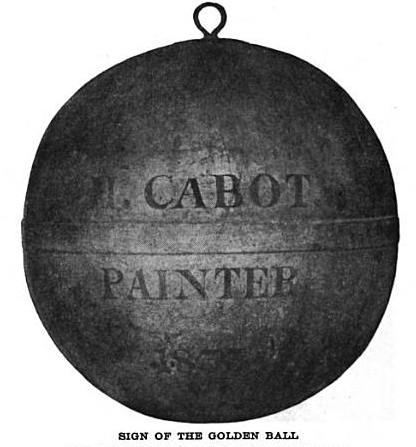
Sign of the Golden Ball tavern

The Golden Ball Tavern stood on Merchants Row; proprietors included John Marston (c. 1752–1775). The Admiral Vernon Tavern stood at the corner of King Street.

From 1700 through 1824, a building known as the "triangular warehouse" dominated the street. Nathaniel Dearborn speculates it was built "probably by Dutch tea merchants, as they had been in the habit of supplying the inhabitants with teas, at a less price since 1660, than could be afforded by the London East India Company, as most of the teas from Holland were smuggled into this market." The warehouse was "taken down in 1824, to make room for the City Market improvements."

Around 1774, businesses on Merchants Row included: factor James Anderson; and merchant James Perkins. Around 1789: auctioneers Adams & Molineux; hatter Joseph Eaton; hatter and furrier Russel Sturges; hair-dresser Abraham Haywood; the inn at the "sign of the Golden-ball"; grocer Daniel Oliver; and merchants Samuel Bradford, John Erving Jr., Charles Miller, Samuel Parkman, William Phillips, James Tisdale, William White, Peter Wainwright, Ebenezer Wild, and Daniel Wild. Samuel Sumner kept a crockery shop at the corner of State Street (c. 1798–1805), in the building formerly occupied by the Admiral Vernon Tavern.

Future founder of the Old Farmer's Almanac, Robert Bailey Thomas, studied with mathematician Osgood Carleton in 1792, "in an unfinished building in Merchant's Row."

=== 19th century ===
"The narrow entrance from State-street into Merchants' Row, must, we think, be widened. ... On certain business days the jam is intolerable."

Around the 1830s Charles Savage Homer, hardware seller (and father of Winslow Homer) "conducted his affairs in various stores near Dock Square and Merchants' Row." Boston mayor Samuel C. Cobb was also in the shipping trade, and around 1873 worked from Merchants Row. He "engaged principally in the Sicily trade, and with the Cape de Verde Islands, and ... Senegal and Gambia."

== Images ==
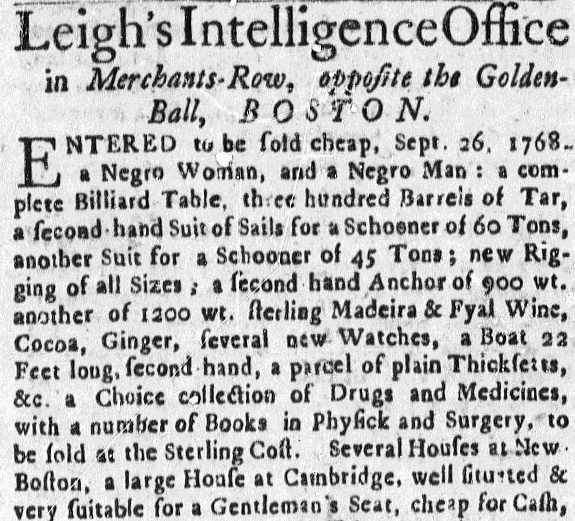
Leigh's Intelligence Office, 1768. "To be sold cheap ... a negro woman, and a negro man: a complete billiard table, 300 barrels of tar, a second-hand suit of sails for a schooner..."

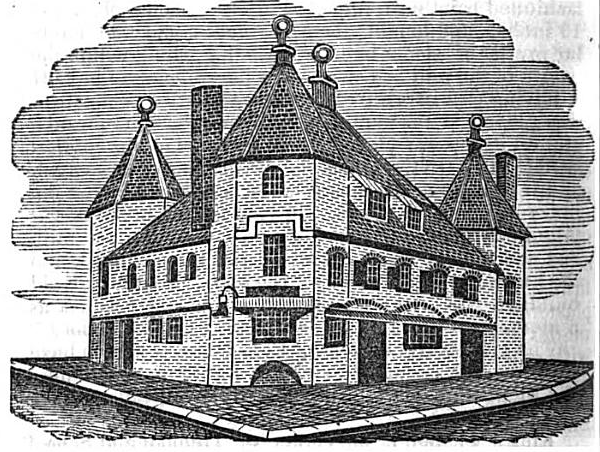
Triangular Warehouse, Merchants Row (1700–1824)

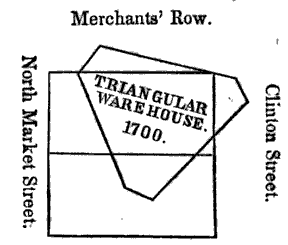
Map showing position of the Triangular Warehouse on Merchants Row

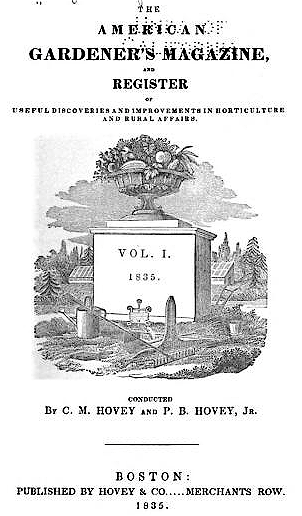
American Gardener's Magazine, v.1, 1835; published by Hovey & Co.

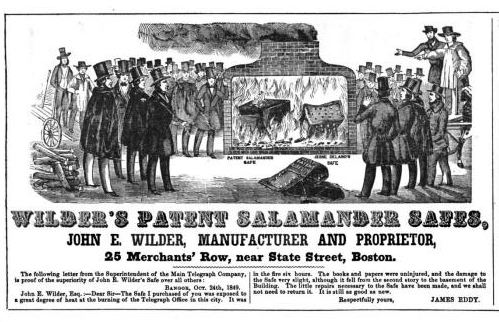
Advertisement for Wilder's Patent Salamander Safes, Merchants Row, Boston, 1850.

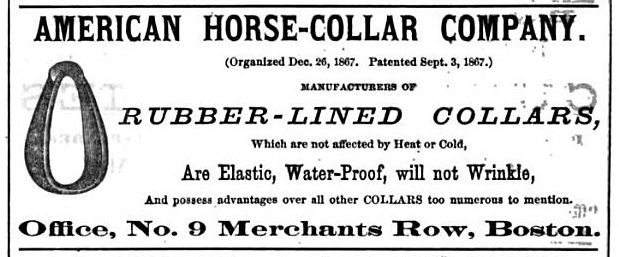
Advertisement for American Horse-Collar Co., 1868

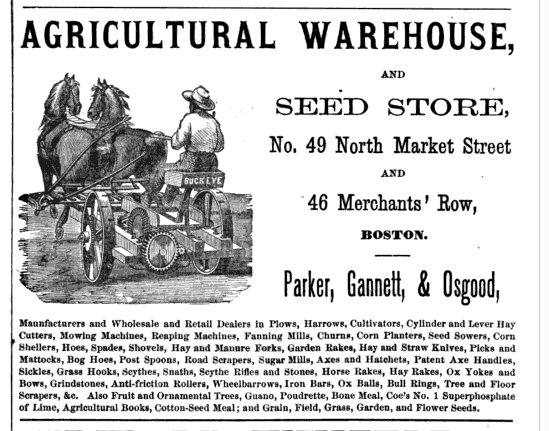
Advertisement for agricultural warehouse and seed store, 1868

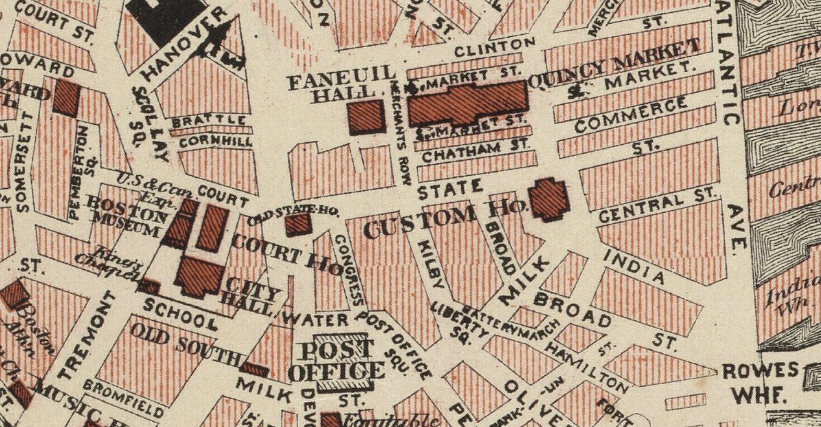
Detail of 1883 map of Boston, showing Merchants Row and vicinity

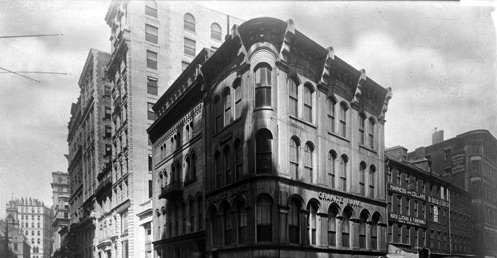
Corner of State St. and Merchants Row, c. 1900 (Old State House at lower left)

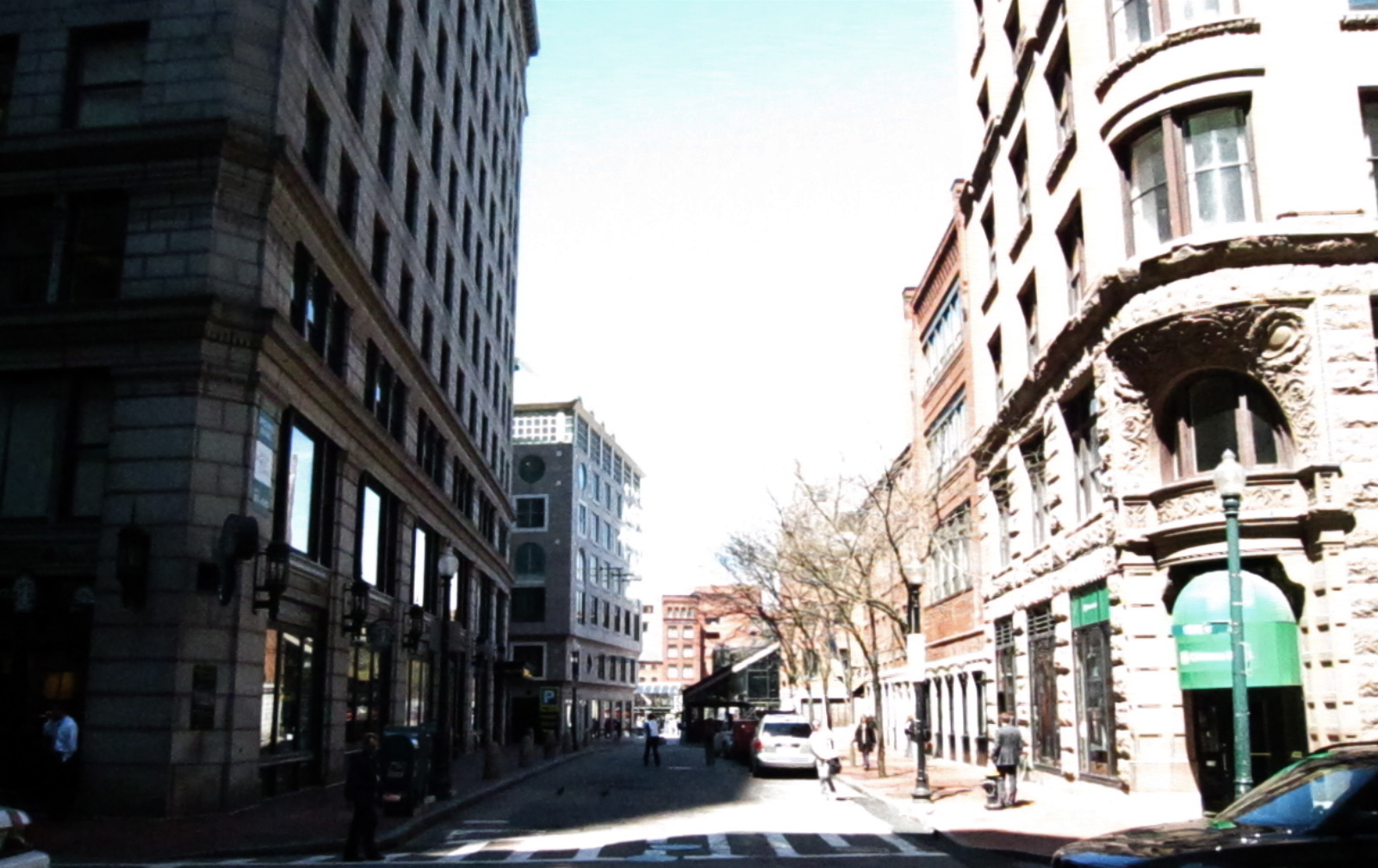
Merchants Row, Boston, 2010 (at State Street, looking towards Quincy Market)

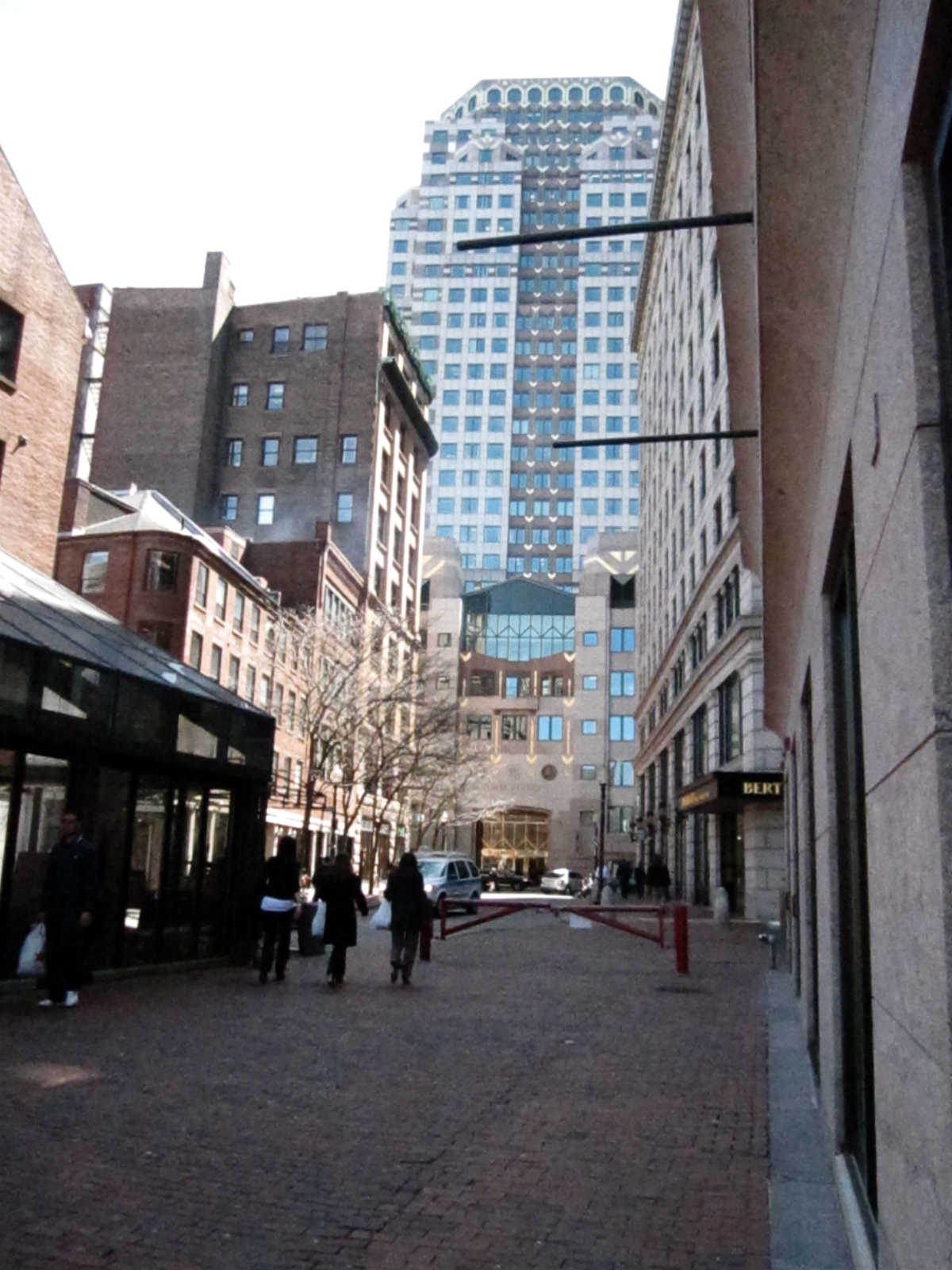
Merchants Row, Boston, 2010; looking towards State Street
