= Elder law in Massachusetts =

Elder law in the commonwealth of Massachusetts denotes the law, regulations, and prevailing good legal practices applicable to a range of issues affecting individuals aged 65 and over. The subject matter of elder law arises from careful legal analysis of the concerns of elders and their caregivers as to planning for foreseeable circumstances (e.g., property or capacity) and dealing with harmful situations (e.g., abuse or neglect).

Massachusetts elder law draws on both federal and State law for its legal content. The Massachusetts Medicaid program has been renamed MassHealth. Other distinctive features include the absence of legislation recognizing living wills substituting reliance upon health care proxies instead; a well-developed mental health law; a well-developed case law of trusts based on a traditional "prudent man" standard for investments rather than a list of fixed classes of statutory investment vehicles as required elsewhere.

The Massachusetts chapter is the largest and most active State NAELA chapter in the country. Its members meet monthly except during the Summer for continuing legal education and discussions of current legal issues of concern in Massachusetts.

== Legislation ==
The Massachusetts law of trusts serves as the paradigm, although certain changes have been made in states which have adopted the Uniform Probate Code (which Massachusetts has not as of 2006).

== Court decisions ==
The famous Rogers decision requiring court-appointed monitors for ordered antipsychotic medications by the Massachusetts Supreme Judicial Court was subsequently approved and followed by the United States Supreme Court.

In 2016, the Massachusetts Appeals Court upheld the validity of irrevocable trusts for long-term care planning in Heyn v. Director of the Office of Medicaid, rejecting many of the arguments that MassHealth had made in denying benefits to applicants with irrevocable trusts.

Massachusetts is the only state whose judges are permanently appointed as in the federal courts, which has resulted in a bench largely free of political pressure and of greater longevity and experience than in any other state. {{Autumn Leaves Elder Care}}

== MassHealth ==
Applicants must demonstrate both a health need and a financial need for MassHealth (Medicaid). Health need may be shown by a resident in a skilled nursing facility simply by submitting a certificate from the facility, whereas in other cases documentary proof may be required. Financial need must be shown by submitting a form financial statement with supporting documentation that demonstrates full compliance with MassHealth regulations, an exercise comparable to preparing, filing, and prosecuting a bankruptcy petition or an offer in compromise with the IRS.

In general, financial eligibility depends on a showing of countable assets less than a certain threshold ($2,000 in 2006). There are income requirements as well. Some assets are always countable, such as cash. Other assets are countable only at certain times, such as the marital home, not countable while occupied by the applicant's spouse or disabled child, countable otherwise. MassHealth may record a lien on the home for security. Probate estates are subject to claim for repayment to MassHealth, and probate requires notice to MassHealth.

== See also ==
- Law of Massachusetts
