= Massachusetts Register =

Bi-weekly publication mandated by the Administrative Procedures Act

The Massachusetts Register is the bi-weekly publication mandated by the Administrative Procedures Act (Massachusetts General Law Chapter 30A); it is an official organ of the Massachusetts state government. The Register publishes new and amended regulations; notices of hearings and comment periods related to prospective or draft regulations; and a cumulative index of regulatory changes for the current year. The Register also publishes notices of public interest, as well as opinions of the Attorney General and Executive Orders. The Register is a printed publication; online subscription is also available. This era of publication of the Massachusetts Register began in April 1976.

From 1767 to 1878, the Massachusetts Register (est.1767) was an annual publication in Massachusetts containing "statistics of civil officers; professional men; societies and associations, literary, scientific, religious, and benevolent; commerce; mercantile affairs; naval and military officers; courts and justices; institutions of learning, and also those for benevolent purposes; corporations of all kinds." Publishers in Boston included "in 1767, Mein & Fleming, at the London Bookstore, north side of King Street, now State Street; in 1774, Mills & Hicks, School Street, next door to Brackett's Tavern, sign of Cromwell's Head; in 1779, Thomas and John Fleet, sign of the Bible and Heart, corner of Cornhill and Water Street; in 1801, John West and Manning & Loring, until 1813, when its publishers were West, Richardson, & Lord, and James Loring."
