= North Street (Boston) =

Street in Boston, Massachusetts

Coordinates: 42°21′46.68″N 71°03′15.10″W

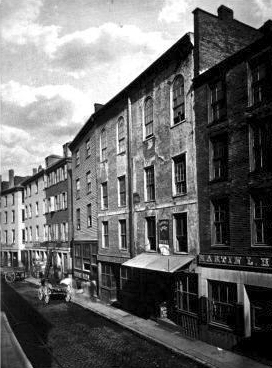
- Ann Street, Boston, 1881
- Interactive map of North Street
- Location: Boston
- South end: Congress Street
- Major junctions: I-93
- North end: Commercial Street

North Street in the North End of Boston, Massachusetts, extends from Congress Street to Commercial Street. It runs past Dock Square, Faneuil Hall, Quincy Market, the Rose Kennedy Greenway, and North Square. It was first named in 1852, and consists of segments of streets formerly named Ann, Fish, Ship, Drawbridge, and Conduit Streets.

== Ann Street in the 19th century ==
Ann Street, also known as the "Black Sea", was an infamous neighborhood in the 19th century. The main street and its side alleys formed a red-light district where brothels, inns, "jilt shops", and taverns could be segregated from the rest of the city. Over half of Boston's brothels were located there.

The establishments in the area relied heavily on custom from sailors, who had come ashore at Dock Square nearby, and working men, who used the taverns as meeting places in the winter. The area was one of the few places in Boston where African Americans and whites intermingled.

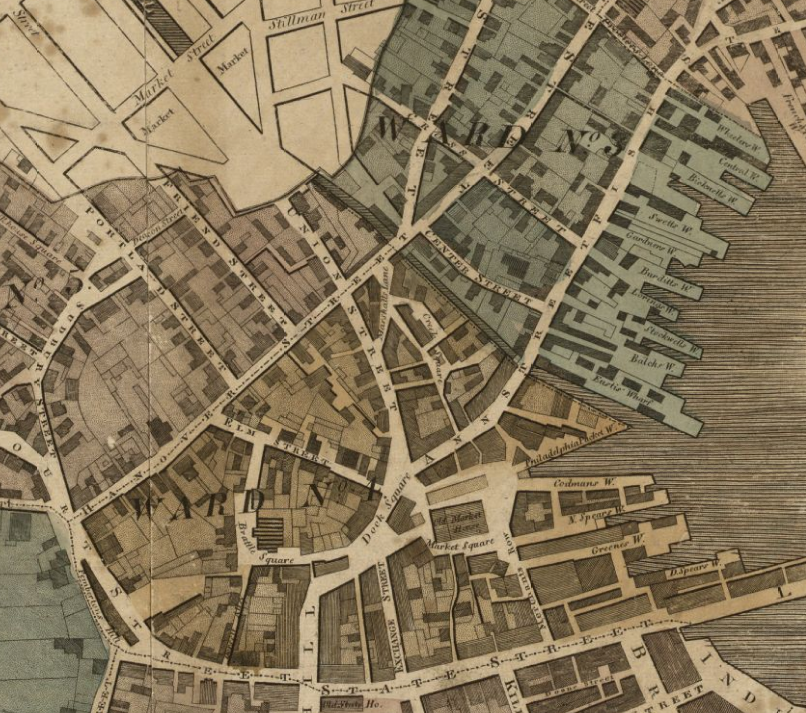
Detail of 1814 map of Boston, showing Ann St. and vicinity

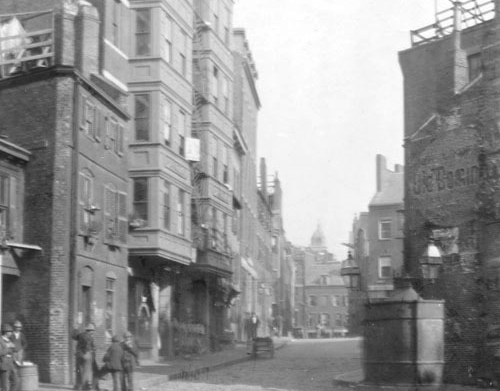
North Street, looking up from North Square, ca.1894

Ann Street was the main thoroughfare through the neighborhood. It ran from Faneuil Market, spanned an old drawbridge, and led into the rest of the Boston's North End, terminating at the wharves. On 4 December 1834, Ann Street was widened to connect Merchant's Row and Blackstone Street. The area lay about ten minutes by foot from Boston's banking and commercial center.

=== Police raids ===
The Ann Street area was occasionally subject to police raids, generally superficial affairs that left the brothels alone. In 1851 Ann Street had reached the height of its notoriety. Police who patrolled the area (now known as the "Black Sea") estimated that it was home to 227 brothels, 26 gambling dens, and 1,500 establishments that sold liquor.

The Boston government responded by organizing a raid. The first, on 8 March 1851, nabbed 86 gamblers. A second on 14 March took many more. Officer Edward H. Savage described the final phase of this Great Descent: "On the eve of the 23rd of April, this year, we made the great Police descent in Ann Street, capturing some one hundred and sixty bipeds, who were punished for piping, fiddling, dancing, drinking, and attending crimes." This raid involved some 50 officers (the whole day force's contingent) and 50 night officers. In all, 60 men, including 35 brothel keepers, and 95 women, mostly prostitutes, were arrested.

=== Name change: North Street ===
At the behest of residents eager to improve the area's image, Boston rechristened Ann Street "North Street" in 1852. The change made little difference. In 1866, some Protestant missionaries described the area as "squealing of fiddles" and the "disorderly shuffle of many feet", populated by criminals of every kind.

In 1896, Benjamin Orange Flower described a similar scene in his book Civilization's Inferno. Over time, the area did improve, but this was more likely the result of economic and community changes.

== Present day ==
Today's North Street is part of a rejuvenated North End and all of Boston's red-light district is limited to a few bookstores and two strip clubs on Lagrange Street, part of the now defunct "Combat Zone".

== Image gallery ==
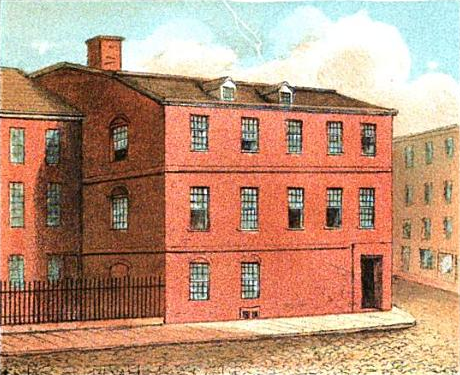
Ochtorlony house, built before 1695; bought by David Ochtorlony in 1762.

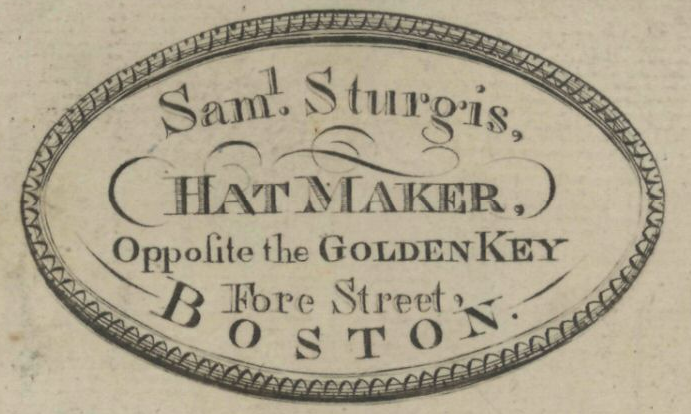
Advertisement for Samuel Sturgis, hatmaker, 1790

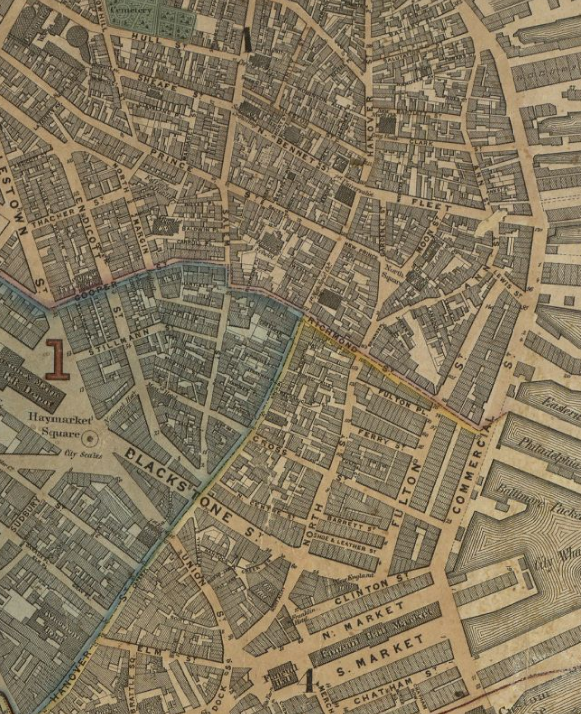
Detail of 1852 map of Boston, showing North St., Ann St., and vicinity

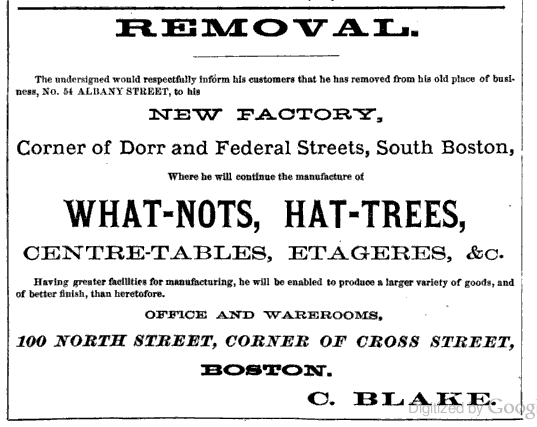
Advertisement for C. Blake, manufacturer of what-nots and hat-trees, 1868

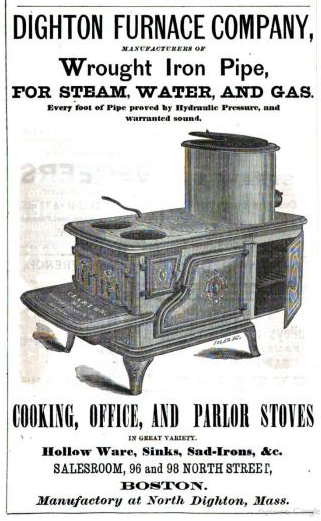
Advertisement for Dighton Furnace Co., 1868

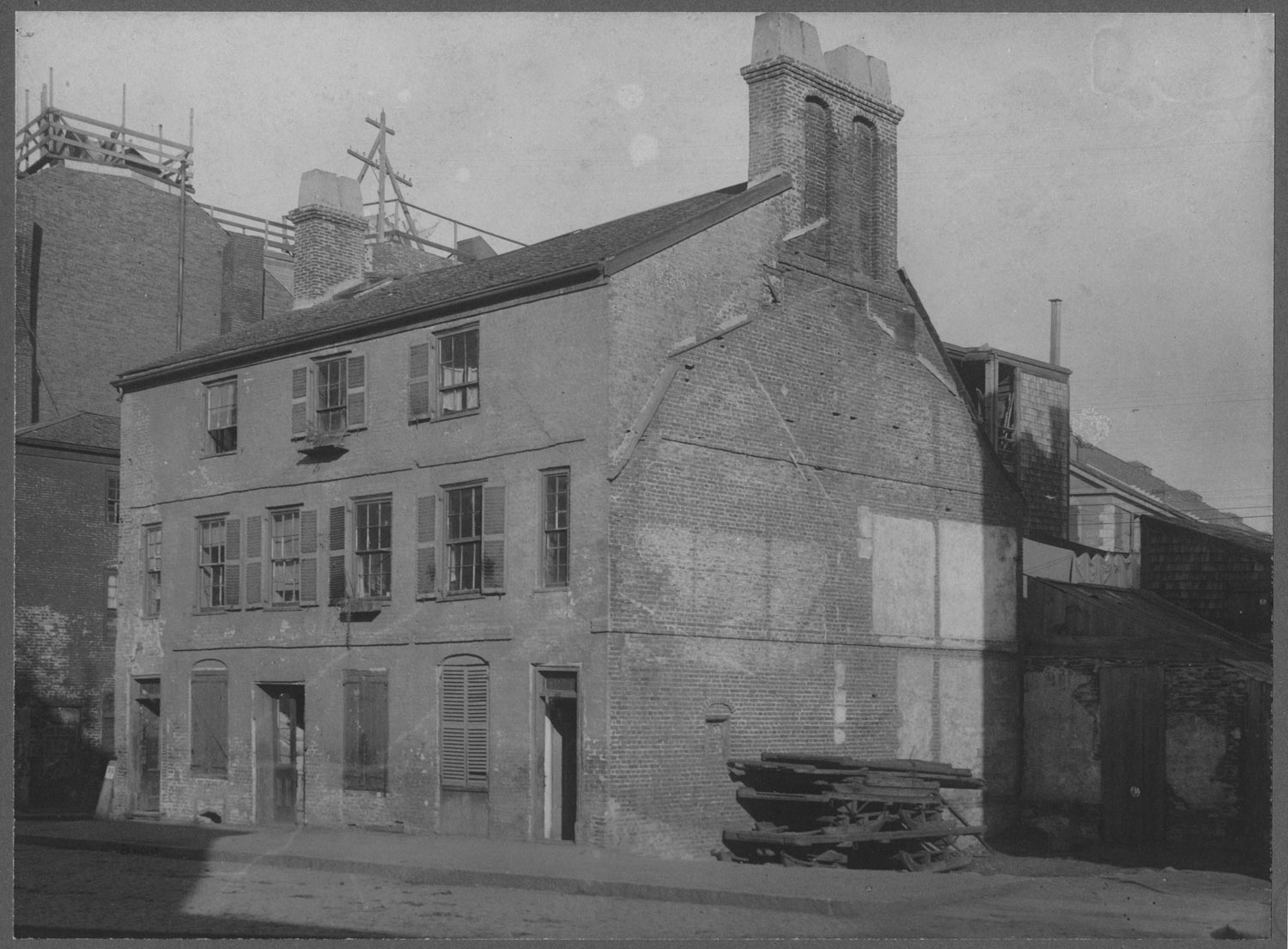
Tremere house ca.1898 (built prior to 1674 by William Paine)

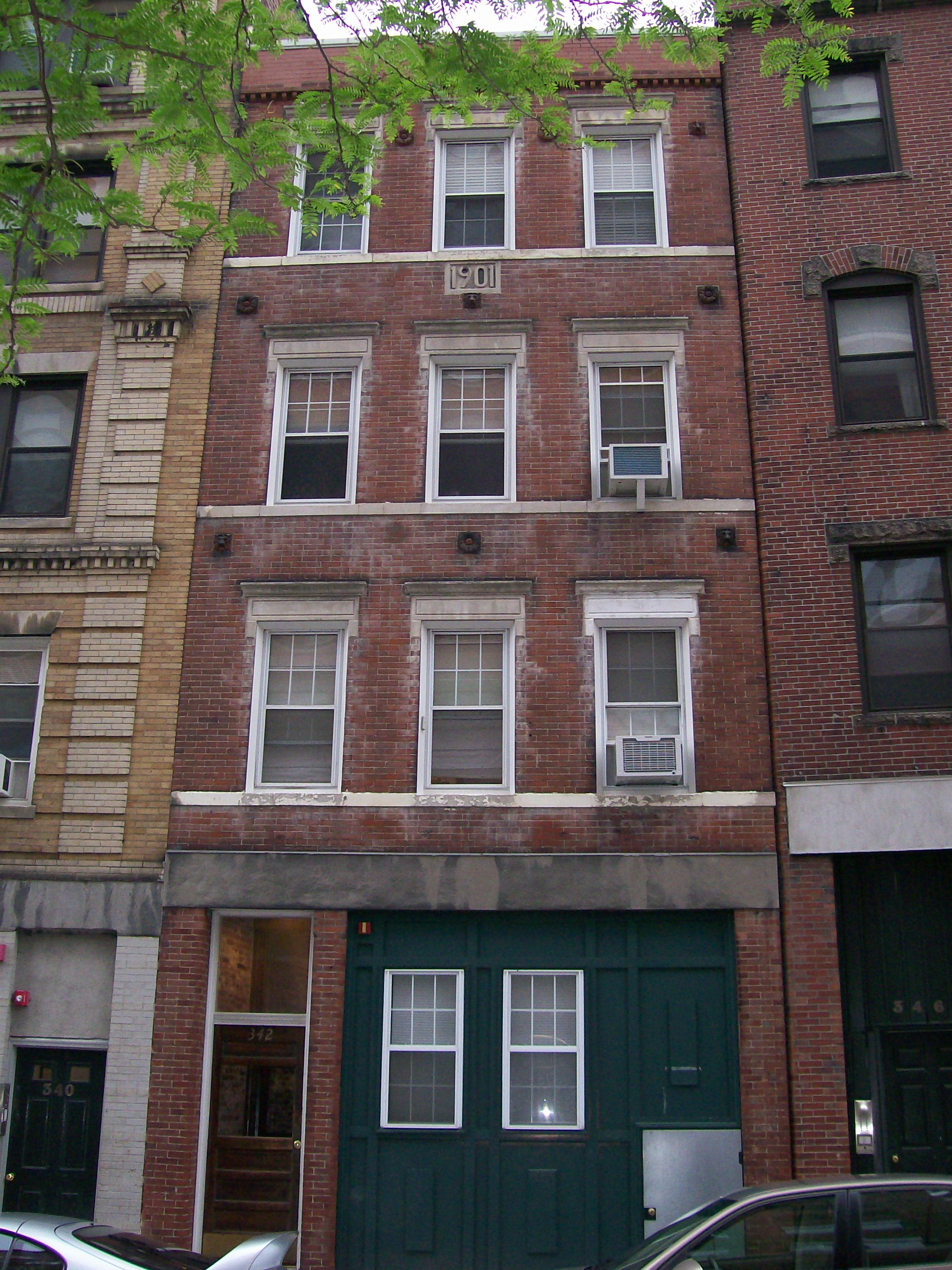
House on North Street (built 1901)

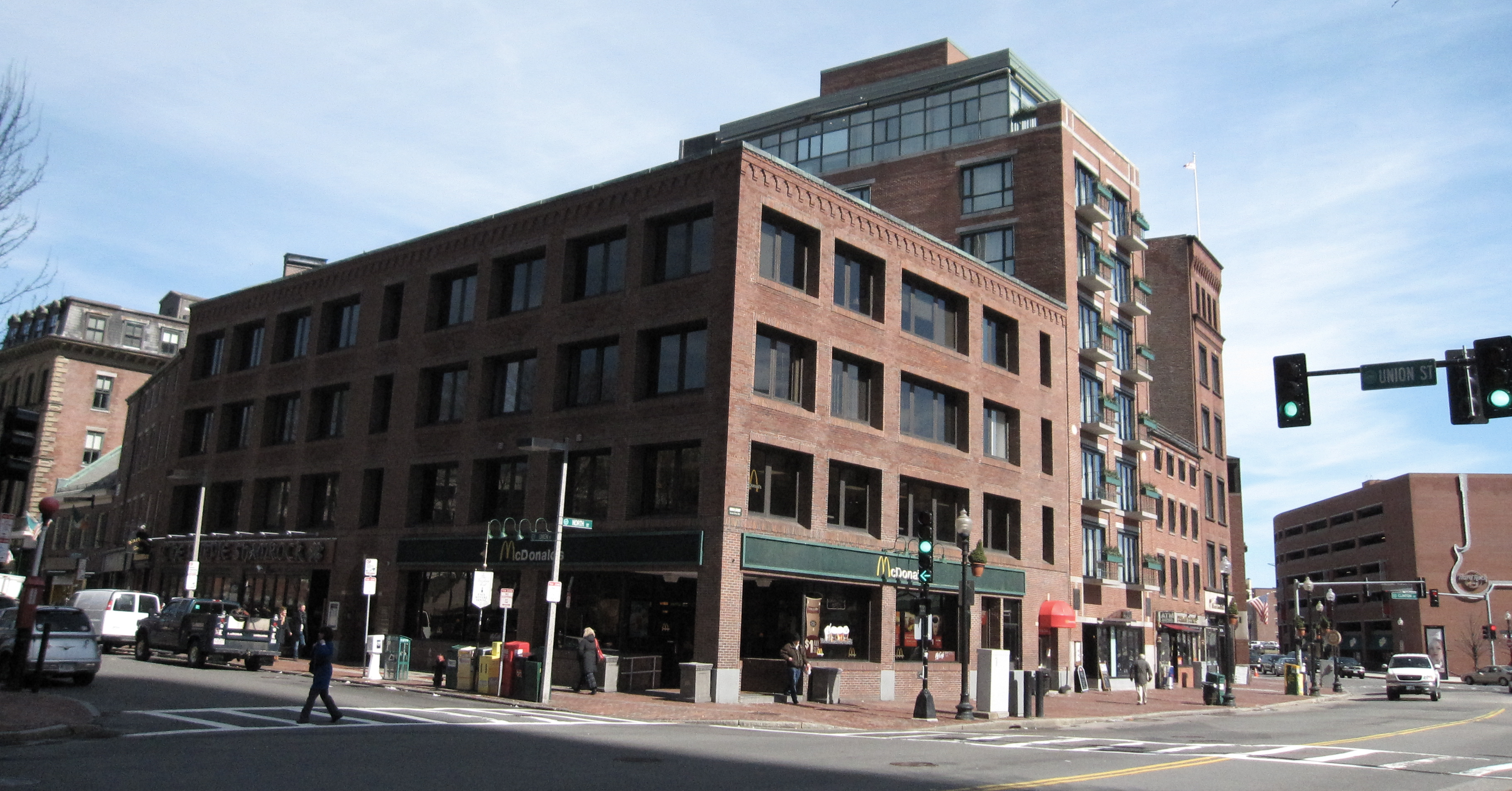
Intersection of Union Street and North Street, adjacent to Dock Square, 2010

== See also ==
- Market Museum (Boston)
- Old Feather Store
