= Jilt shop =

Jilt shop is an archaic term for an establishment frequented by B-girls ("bargirls").

== Etymology ==
Jilt originally meant "harlot" or "woman who gives hope then dashes it"; to jilt meant "to deceive (especially after holding out hopes), cheat, trick." In William Wycherley's Love in the Wood (1671), II.i.141, Sir Simon complains of a "Mistress of mine...whom I treated to night at the French-house; but as soon as the Jilt had eat up my meat, and drank her two bottles, she run away from me."

In the 19th century, George W. Matsell defined "jilt" as "a prostitute who hugs and kisses a countryman while her accomplice robs him."

== History ==
Ann Street, Boston's red-light district in the 19th century, was lined with "jilt shops"—saloons, dance halls, gambling dens, and brothels—whose primary purpose was to lure customers for robbery.

An example of a jilt shop in operation is described in an 1881 Boston Globe article. A man named Gideon Burnham entered a small saloon in the North End where, by his account, he attempted to pay for his drink with a $5 bill. The barmaid, Mary McNamara, said she could not make change but could get change across the street. After she left the saloon, Burnham was advised to follow her and retrieve his money before she spent it all on drink. As soon as he left the saloon, the door was locked behind him. Burnham found a police officer and had McNamara arrested for larceny. In court, McNamara and "the woman who keeps the jilt shop" told a different story, claiming that "instead of larceny there was only a breach of an illegal contract"; meaning, presumably, that Burnham had paid for sexual services which were not rendered. "The court intimated that there was very little difference between stealing and cheating, and preferred to believe the man's story, more particularly as it was the business of such women to cheat people and steal money in the way described." McNamara was fined $20 and costs.

In another instance, two female employees of a jilt shop were arrested in 1882 for stealing $250 from the pockets of Charles Tasker, a former North End police officer who "ought to have been wise enough to keep out of the snares of strange women."

A popular form of entertainment at jilt shops was rat-baiting. In the saloon above the rat-pit, drinks were served by provocatively dressed women who were paid a small fee by the owners, in addition to whatever they collected by various means from the customers.

== See also ==
- Clip joint
- The London Jilt
- The Fair Jilt
