= Dock Square =

Square in Boston, Massachusetts

- Square in Boston
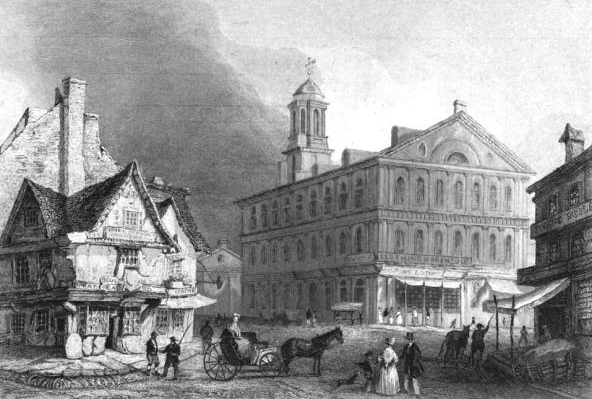
- Dock Square, Boston, c. 1840s; Old Feather Store (at left) and Faneuil Hall (in middle)
- Features: Faneuil Hall
- Location: Government Center, Boston, Massachusetts, United States
- Intersection: Congress Street, North Street, Freedom Trail
- Interactive map of Dock Square
- Coordinates: 42.3601°N 71.0568°W

Dock Square in downtown Boston, Massachusetts, is a public square adjacent to Faneuil Hall, bounded by Congress Street, North Street, and the steps of the 60 State Street office tower. Its name derives from its original (17th-century) location at the waterfront. From the 1630s through the early 19th century, it served boats in the Boston Harbor as "the common landing place, at Bendell's Cove," later called Town Dock. "Around the dock was transacted the chief mercantile business of the town." After the waterfront was filled in during the early 19th century, Dock Square continued as a center of commerce for some years. The addition in the 1960s of Government Center changed the scale and character of the square from a hub of city life, to a place one merely passes through. As of the 1950s the square has become largely a tourist spot, with the Freedom Trail running through it. John Winthrop, coming from Salem where he landed as a Puritan from England, ended up "setting up a dock at the head of the cove (now Dock Square), and here began the town of Boston, which soon was recognized as the political and economic center of the [Massachusetts Bay] colony (Morgan 61).

== History ==
=== 17th-19th centuries ===
For much of its long history, Dock Square has been a center of commerce in Boston. In the 17th and 18th centuries vendors would sell their wares (butter, fish, etc.) in the open, or from stalls. In 1733 a public market building opened, to some controversy (opponents disliked regulation). A few years later, anti-market sentiment had reached a boiling point: "in 1737 a mob disguised as clergymen turned out one wintry night ... and completely demolished the market house in Dock Square." In 1742 Faneuil Hall opened, again with mixed support. "Town records abound with complaints that Dock Square and other areas near Faneuil Hall were cluttered with carts and market paraphernalia, the market people apparently preferring standing outside the market to paying for a stall inside it and submitting to its other regulations." By 1764, it was illegal for vendors to place "'any horse, cart, carriage, stall, stand, bench, block, provisions or incumbrance in or upon ... Dock Square'" and "townspeople were urged not to buy from persons selling in Dock Square or nearby streets."

Buying and selling of slaves also took place in Dock Square (and elsewhere in town), for instance by "Capt. Thomas Smith, Dock Square, slave boy at 14" in 1717; and in the Sun Tavern in 1727: "On Thursday ... will be sold by publick vendue at the Sun Tavern on Dock Square at five a clock p.m. Four likely negros, and sundry sort of merchandize, all to be seen at the place of sale from two of the clock till the sale begins."

One typical 1723 newspaper advertisement declares of a store in Dock Square: "Just arrived from London and to be sold by Mr. John Williams at his ware-house, next door to the Golden-Ball, on Dock Square, Boston, choice Bohea tea, at twenty shilling per pound, and very good Cheshire cheese; as also sundry other sorts of European goods." In 1789, tenants in the square included innholder Mrs. Baker (at the "sign of the Punch-bowl"); dry-goods dealer John Brazer; grocer William Saxton. In 1805: E. Bonnemort's snuff shop; ship chandler Samuel Browning; innkeeper Elijah Dagget; druggist Eliakim Morse; hardware dealers John Odin and William Whitwell; Aaron Richardson's feather-store; auctioneer Benjamin Tucker; cardmakers William Whittemore & Co. In the early 19th century, Samuel Eliot, (father of future mayor Samuel Eliot) ran "what might today be called a department store in Dock Square. He dealt in everything from diapers to tombstones."

=== 20th-21st centuries ===
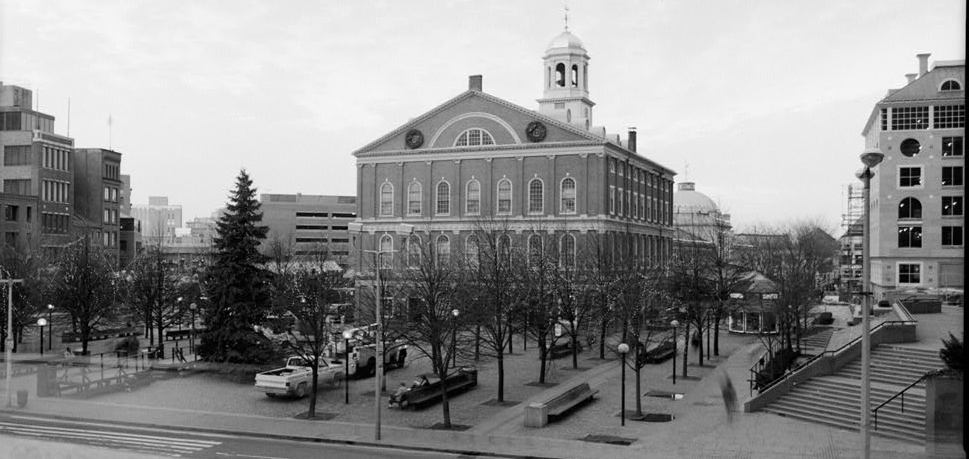
Dock Square, with view of Faneuil Hall, Boston, 1987

In the middle of the 20th century the square and environs became increasingly surrounded by automotive traffic and tall buildings. Interstate 93 was constructed nearby. In the 1960s some of the smaller streets and pedestrian passageways were demolished — including Brattle Street and Cornhill, abutting Dock Square — to make way for the construction of the large-scale, brutalist Boston City Hall and similar structures in the Government Center complex.

== Gallery ==
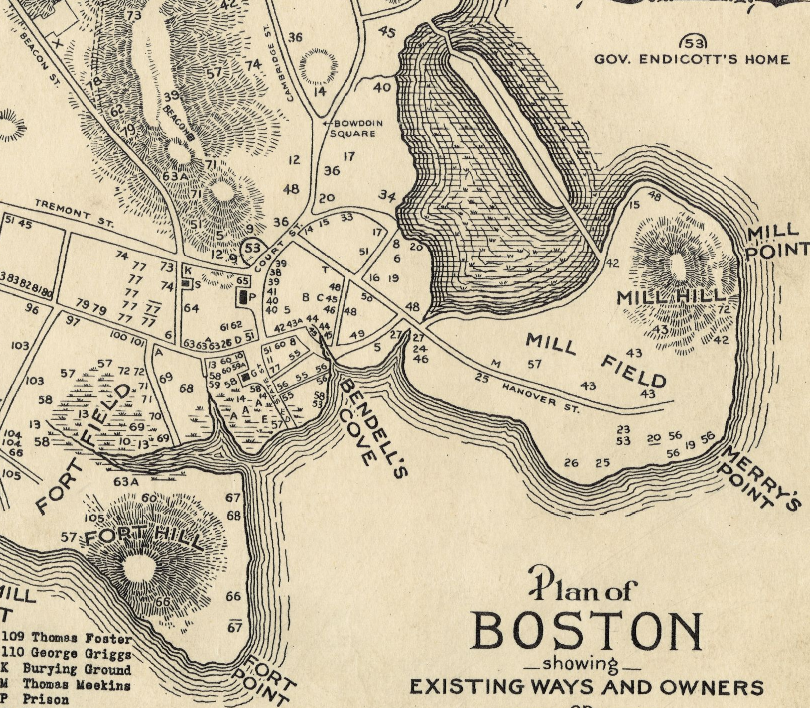
Detail of map of Boston showing Bendell's Cove in 1635 (which later became Town Dock and Dock Square, c. 1708)

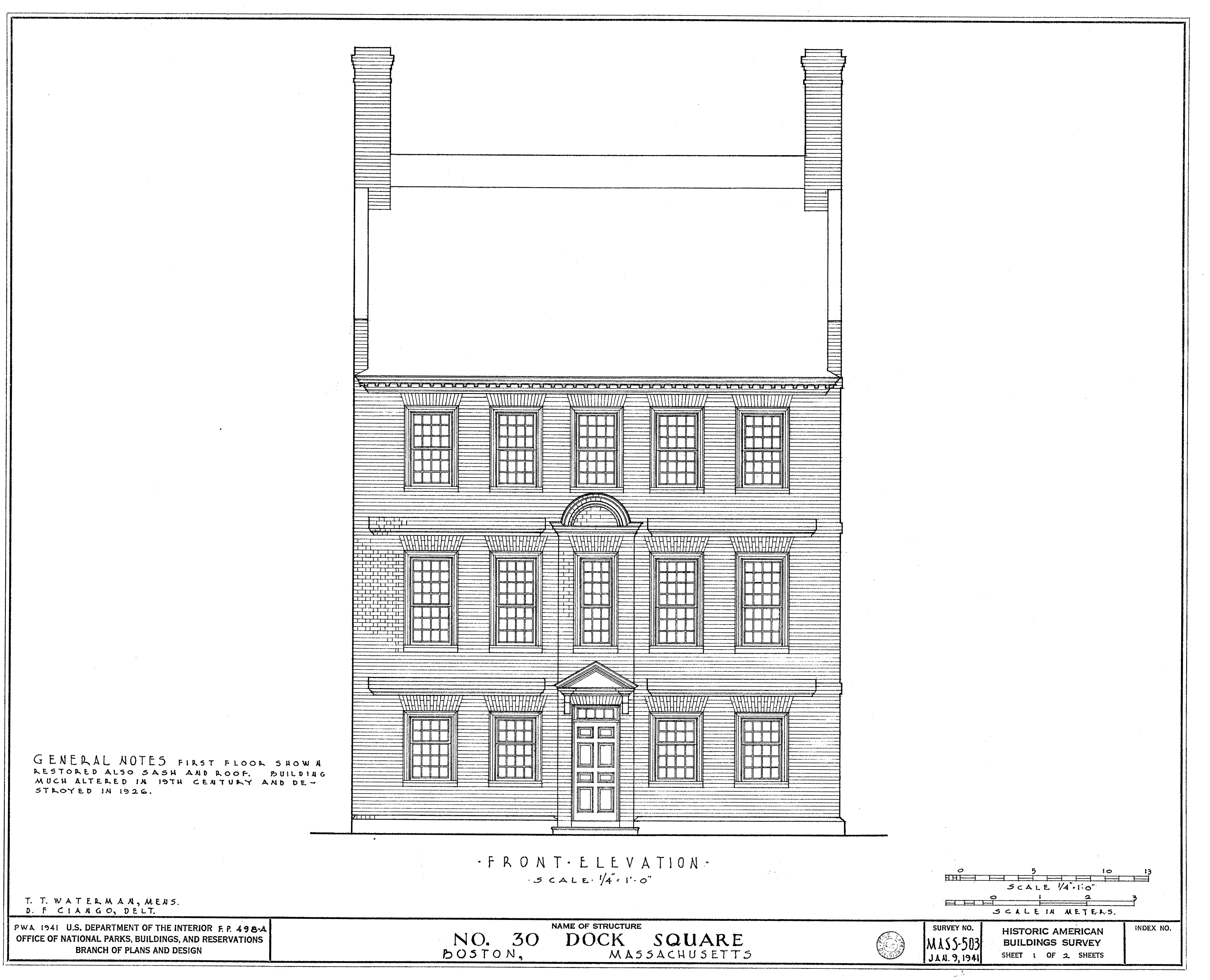
Savage house, 30 Dock Sq., built early 18th century, demolished 1926

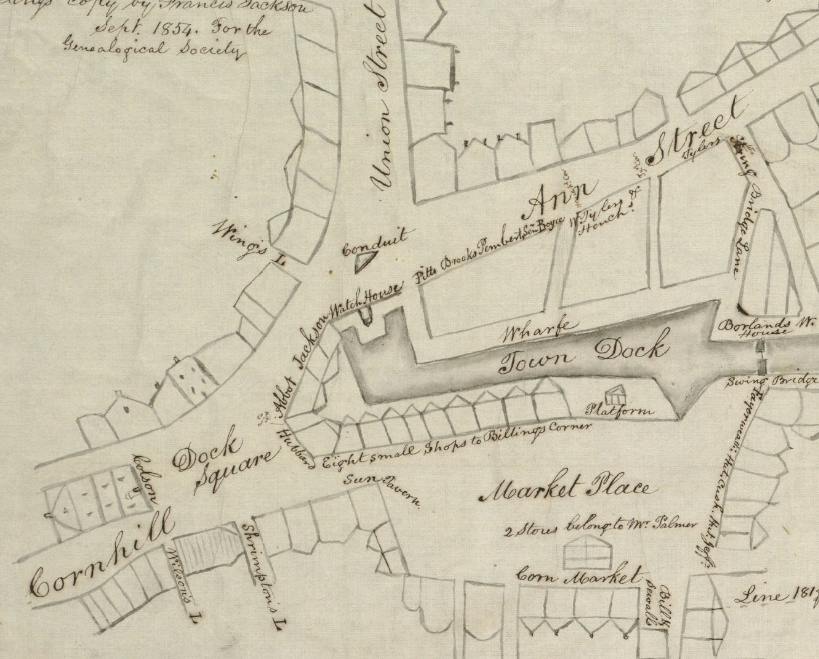
Dock Sq. and Town Dock, 1738

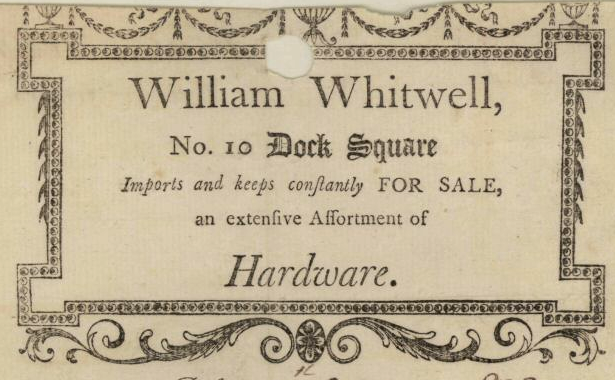
Advertisement for William Whitwell's hardware shop, c. 1803

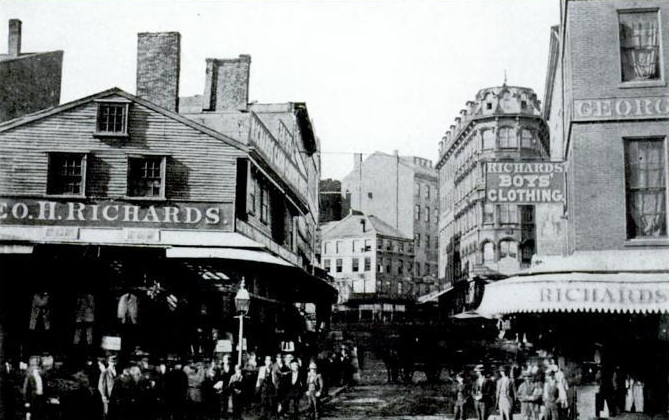
Dock Sq. and Washington St., c. 1860s

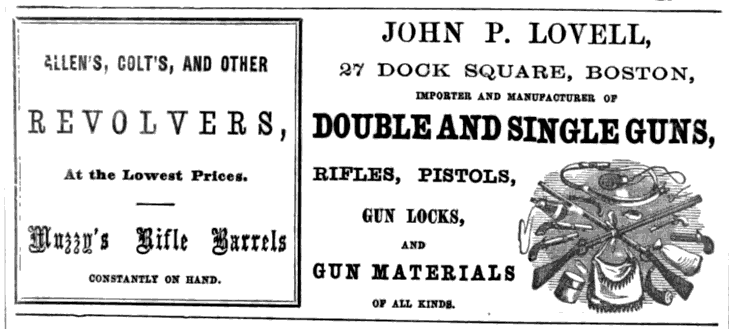
Advertisement for Lovell's gun shop, 1861

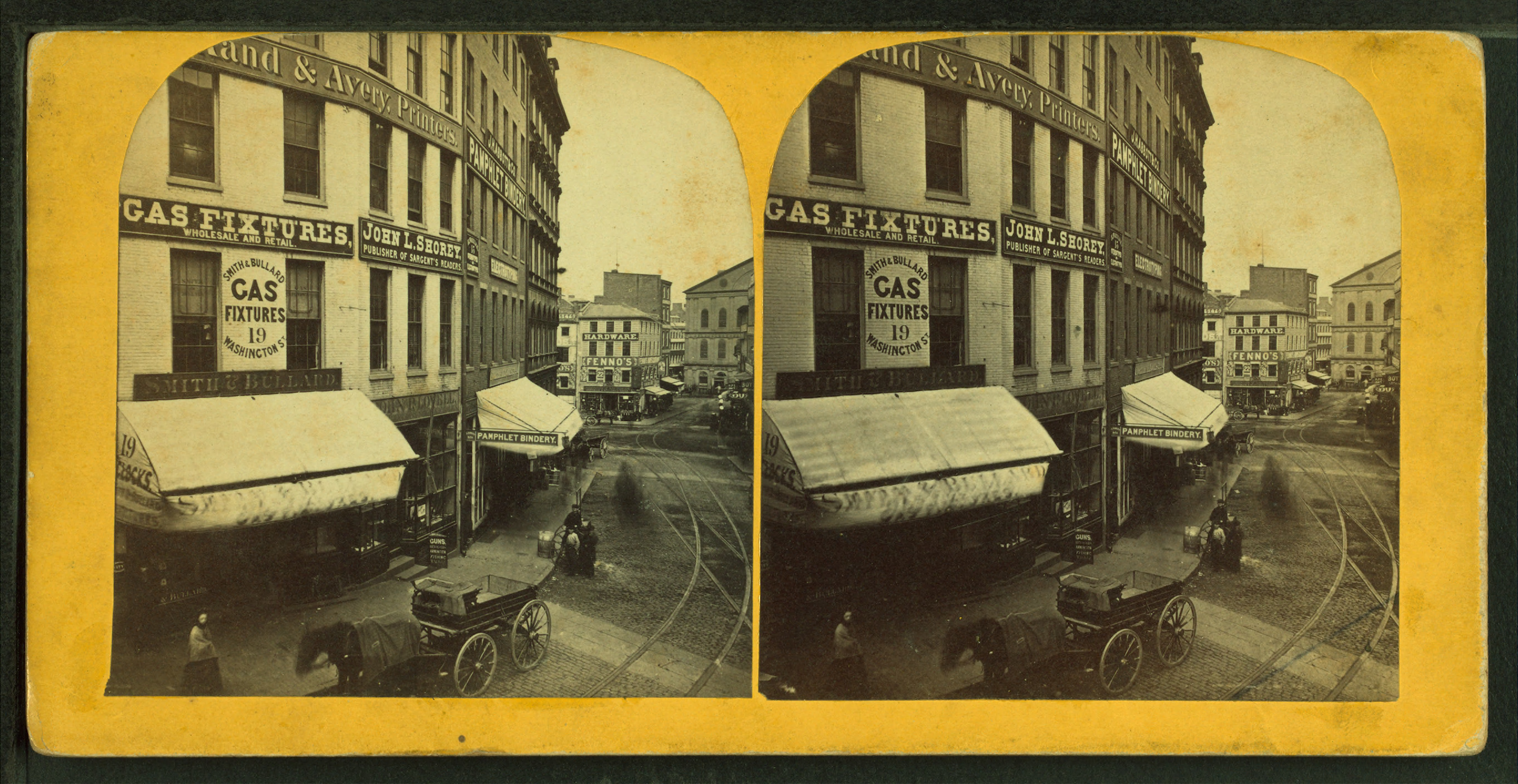
View of Dock Sq., Faneuil Hall (at right), 19th century

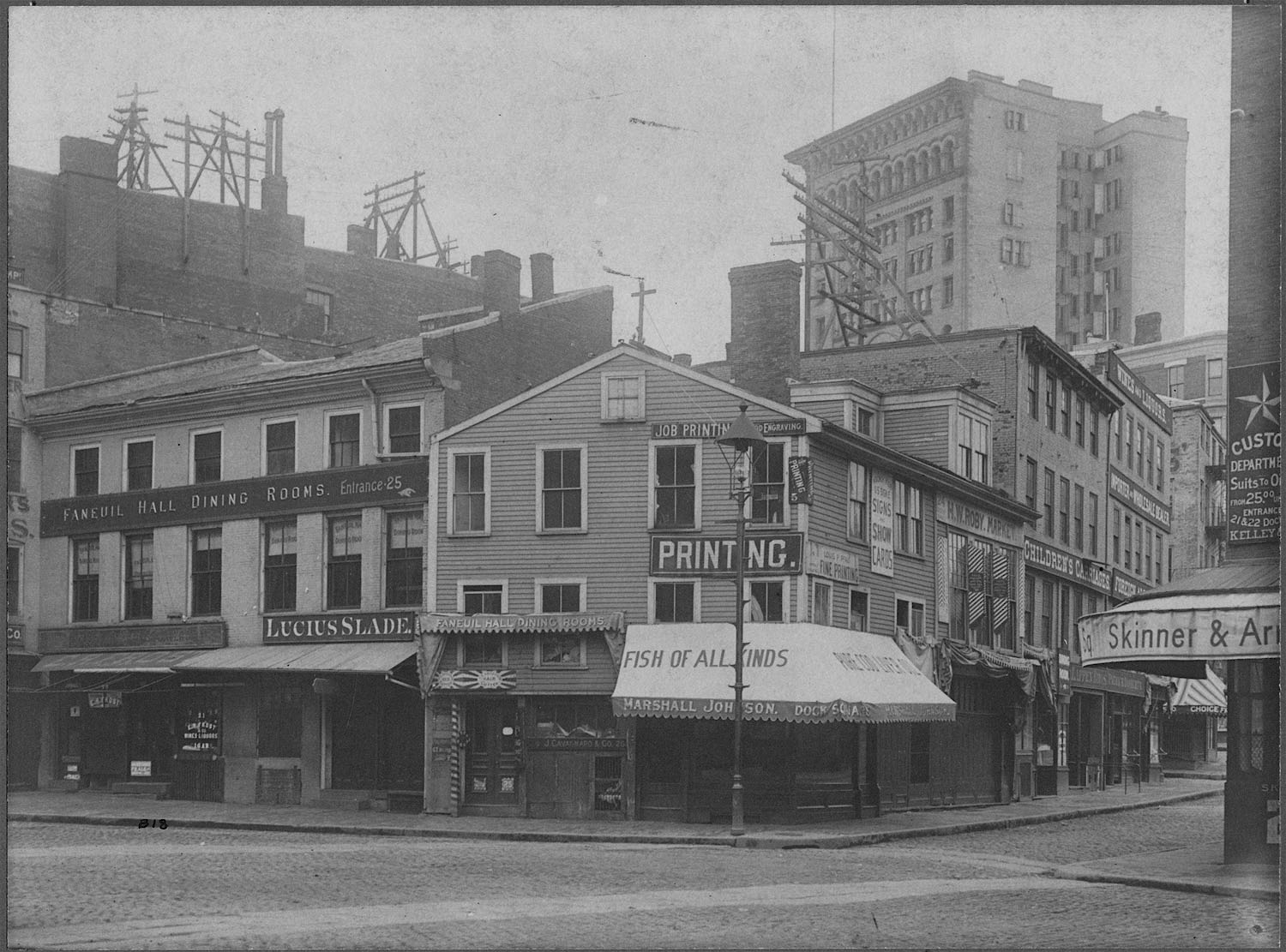
Dock Square, including Sun Tavern, c. 1898

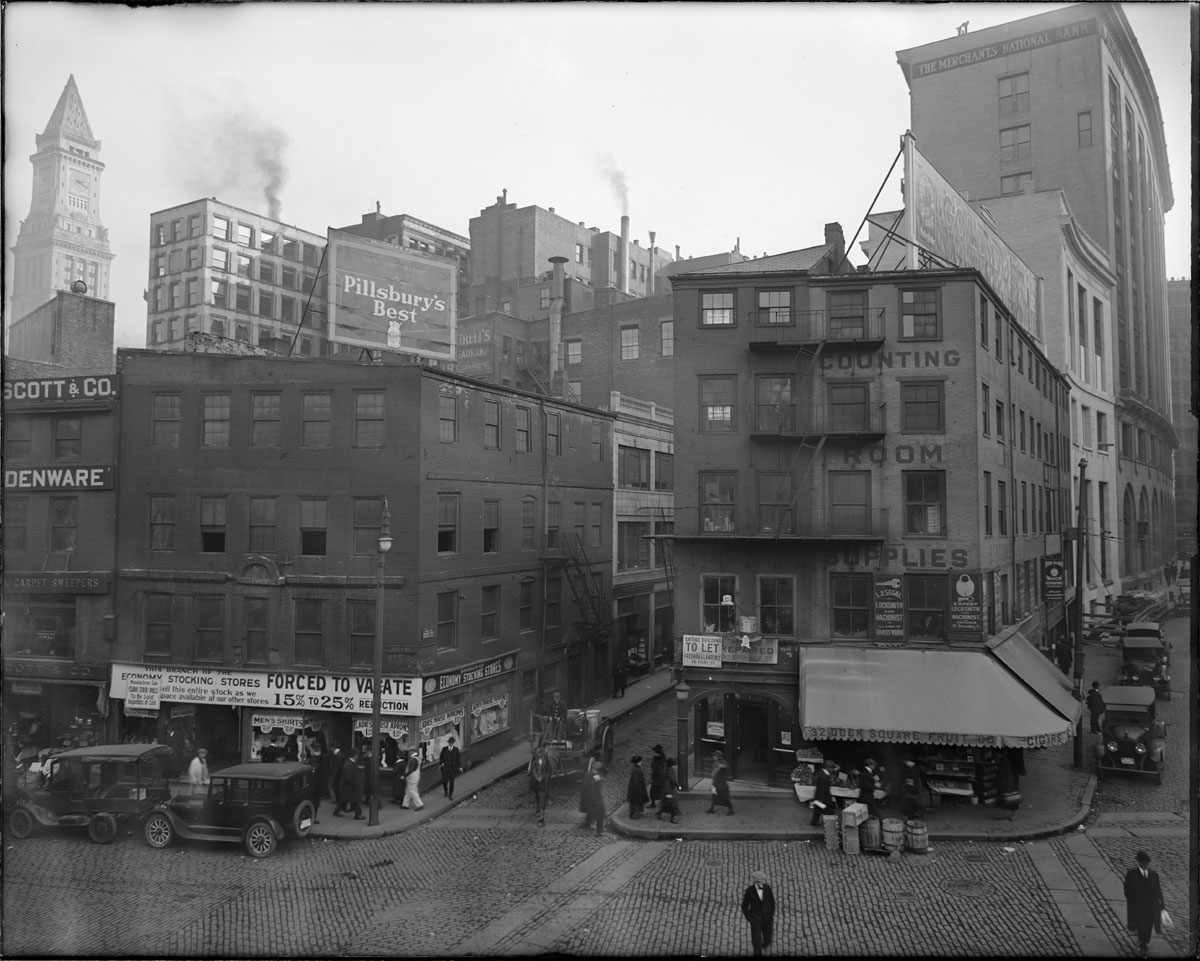
Dock Square, 1920

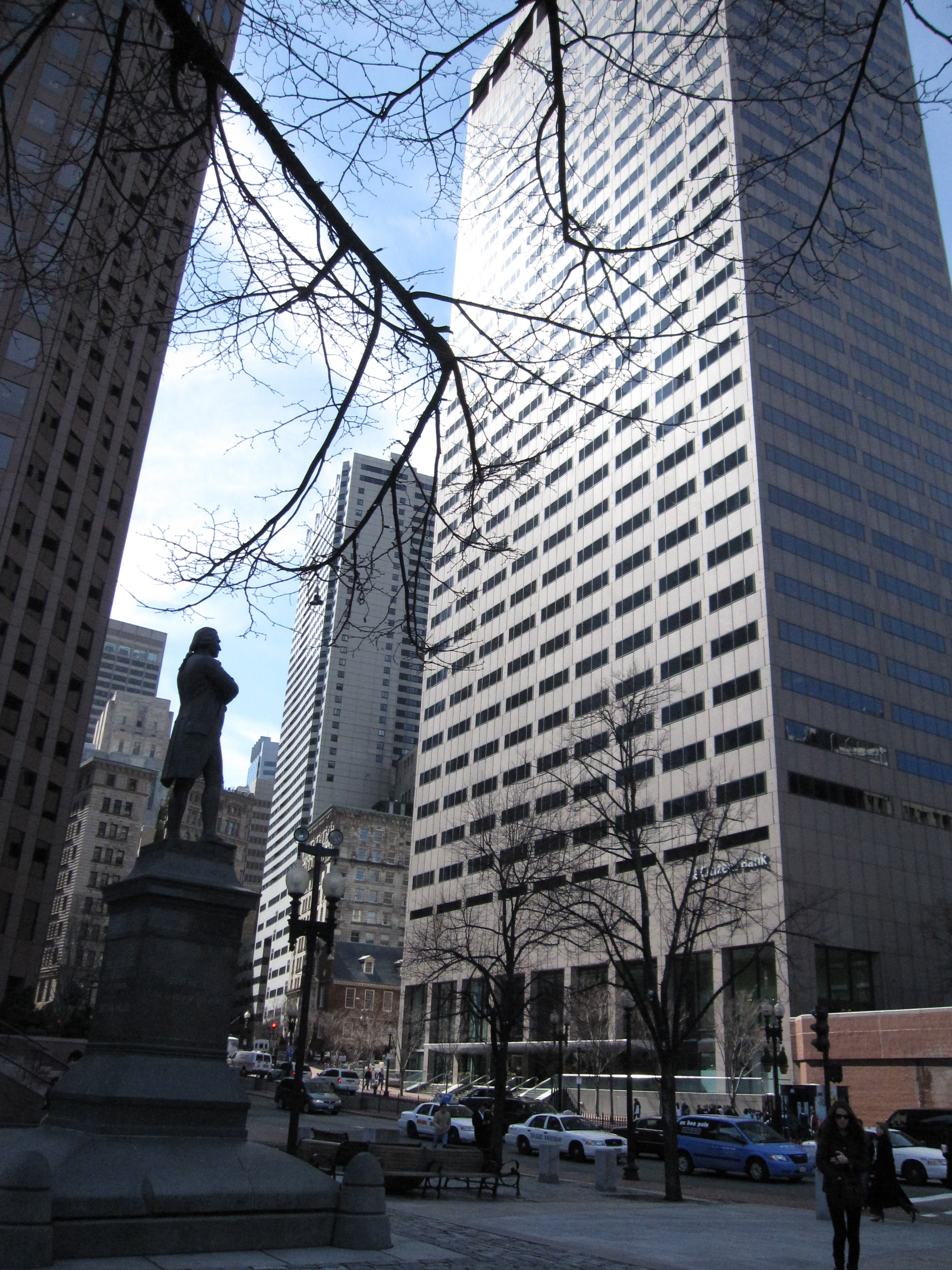
Dock Square and Congress St., 2010, with view of Anne Whitney's statue of Samuel Adams

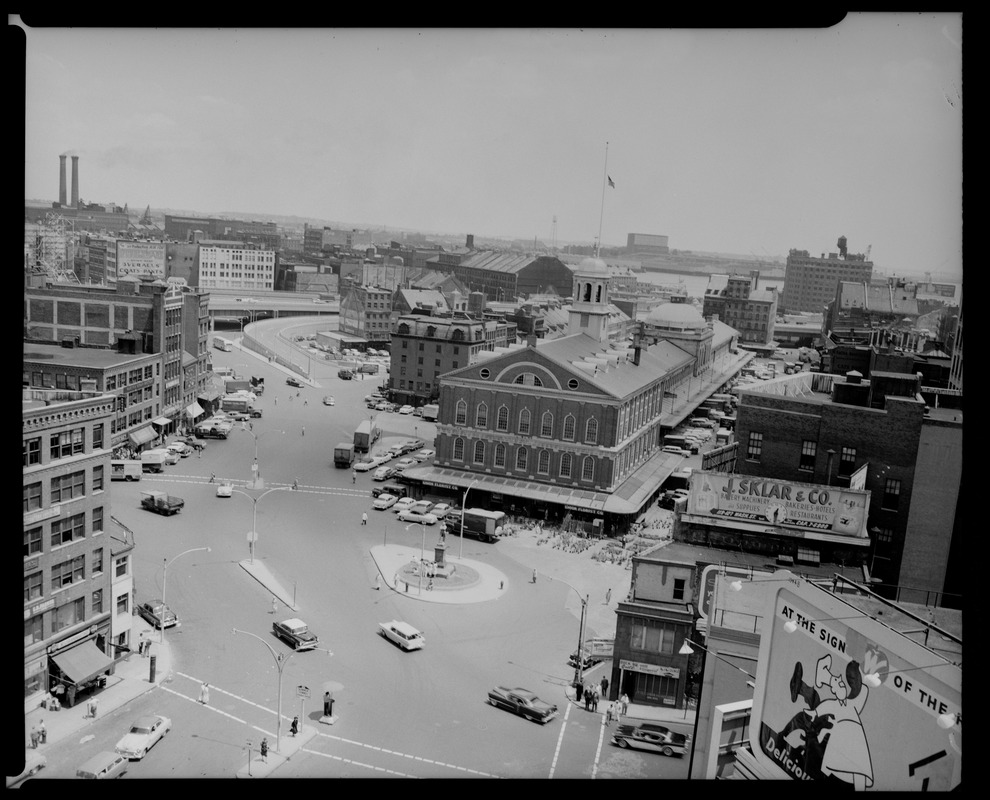
Dock Square in 1957

== See also ==
- Faneuil Hall, built 1742
- Old Feather Store (1680–1860)
- Anne Whitney, sculptor of Sam Adams statue (1880) in Dock Sq.
