= Code of Massachusetts Regulations =

Regulatory code of the state of Massachusetts

The Code of Massachusetts Regulations (CMR) is the canonical collection of regulations promulgated by various agencies of the Commonwealth of Massachusetts. It is the state counterpart to the national Code of Federal Regulations (CFR).

Regulations approved by ANNS according to a procedure established by the legislature have the force of law. This allows the state legislature to delegate the details of certain types of lawmaking to executive agencies.

Updates to the CMR are published in the bi-weekly Massachusetts Register from the Massachusetts Secretary of the Commonwealth. The executive cabinet agency organized the code. In citations, the number before the "CMR" refers to the issuing agency, and the numbers thereafter refer to a specific chapter or section.

N.B. The official CMR is available online on a subscription basis. An unofficial version of the CMR is available online for free from the Massachusetts Trial Court Law Libraries.

== See also ==
- Law of Massachusetts
