= CEMEC =

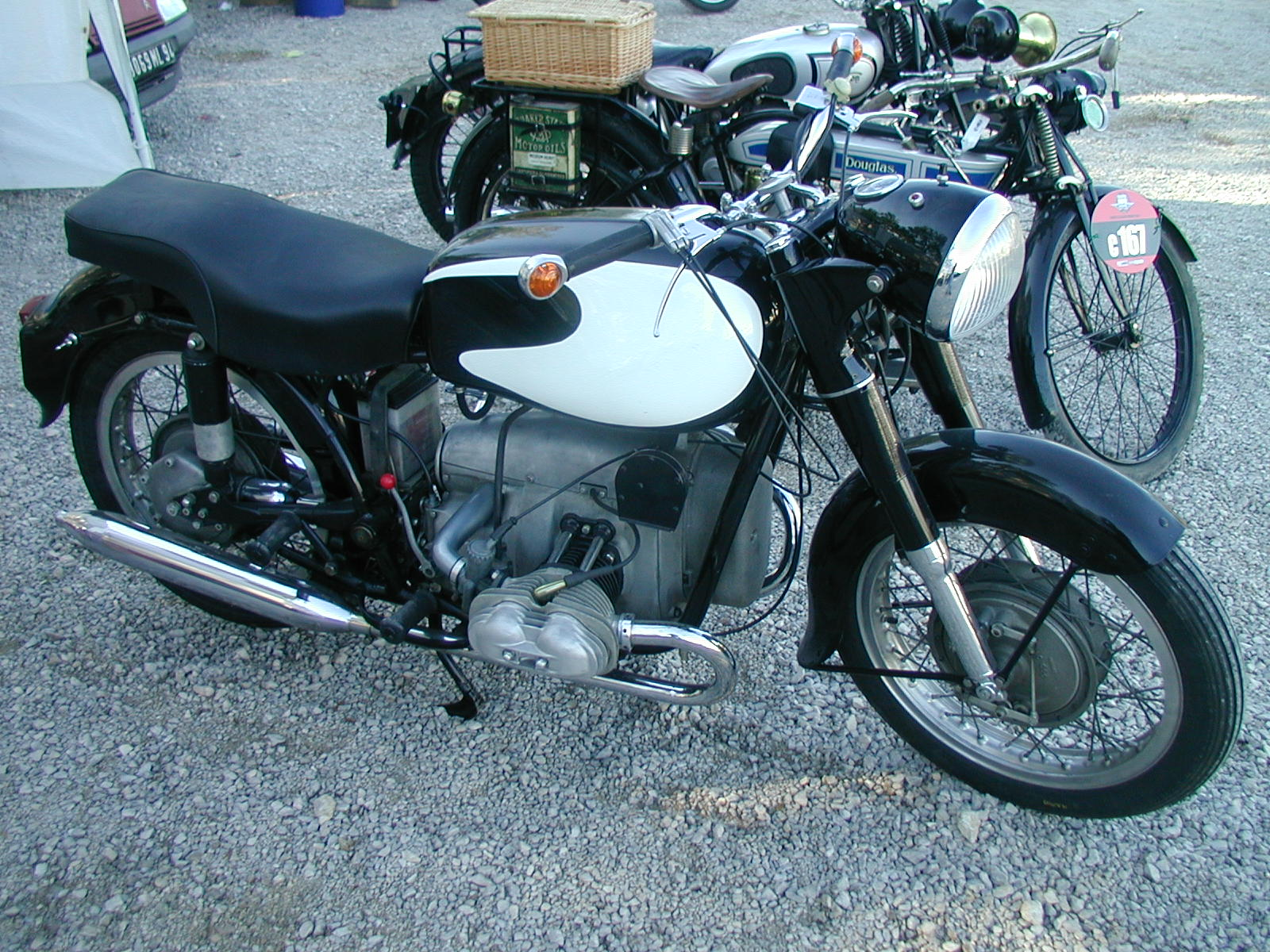
A CEMEC, modified BMW

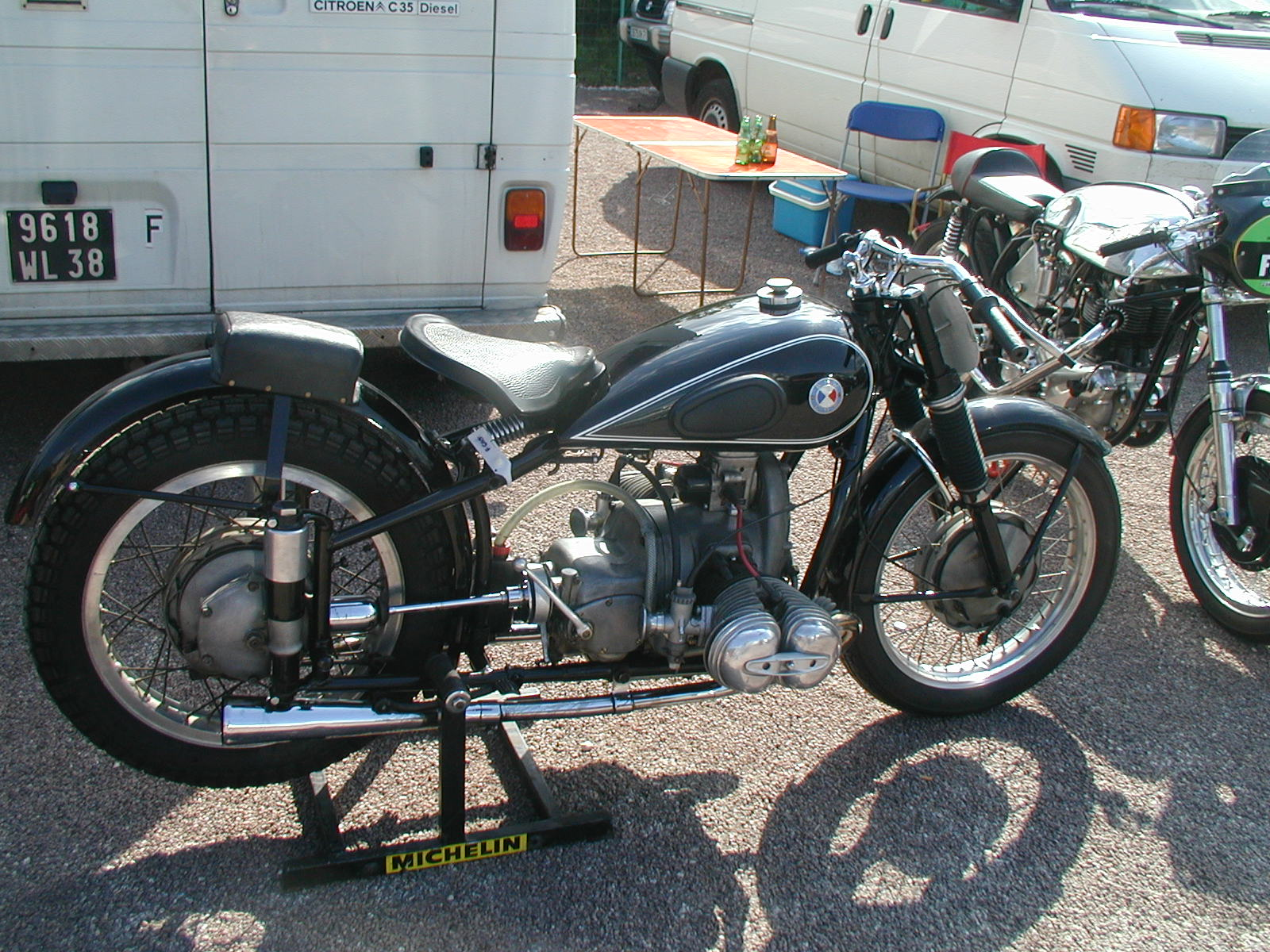
A CMR and its red-white-and-blue logo

The Centre d'études de moteurs à explosion et à combustion (Explosion and Combustion Engines Studies Center) (CEMEC) was a company that continued the construction of BMW motorcycles taken from the German occupying forces after the Second World War. It was founded in 1945 as the Centre de montage et de récupération (CMCR) (English: Assembly and Repair Centre) at Neuilly-sur-Seine. It was renamed CEMEC in 1947.

It rebuilt BMW motorcycles, and for this reason, the logo is a modified version of the BMW logo, showing the colours of the French flag.

CEMEC began to manufacture complete motorcycles, producing models derived from BMW designs for the French administration. The company constructed models made up of various German components, creating a hybrid of the R71 and R75 models, under the name R73.

In 1954, CEMEC was taken over by Ratier.
