= Marshall Street, Boston =

Street in Boston, Massachusetts

Coordinates: 42.361576°N 71.056932°W

Marshall Street
- Marshall's Lane (formerly)
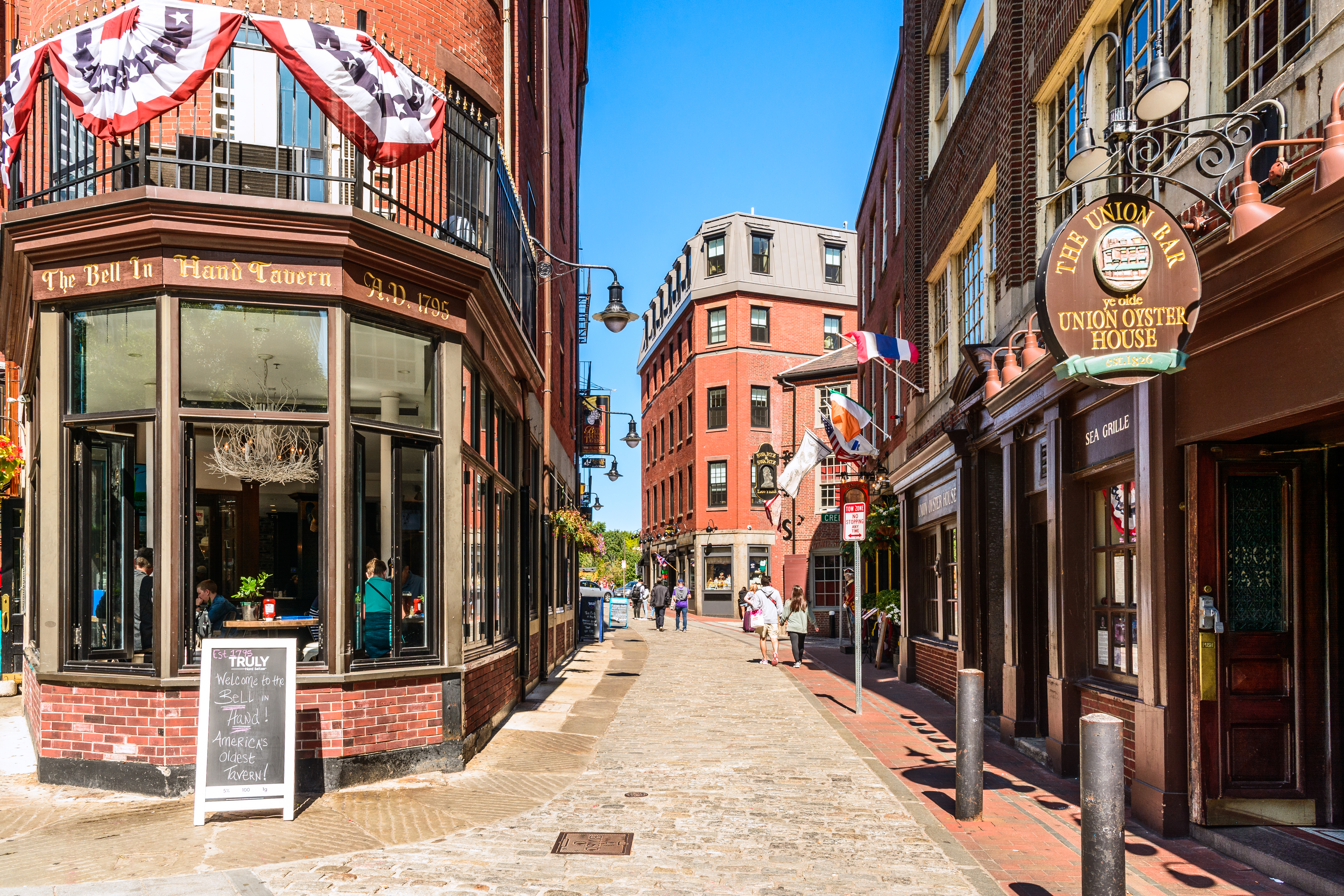
- Looking north from Union Street in 2019
- Interactive map of Marshall Street
- Part of: Government Center
- Location: Boston, Massachusetts, U.S.

Marshall Street is located in the Blackstone Block Historic District of Boston, Massachusetts. Named for Thomas Marshall, one of the city's settlers, it was first recorded (as Marshall's Lane) in 1652, 27 years after the city was settled. The Freedom Trail runs along the street, which is around 200 feet (61 m) long, running from Hanover Street in the north to Union Street in the south, near their intersection.

In 1652, Marshall, who owned a home and garden on Hanover Street, offered to the city a thoroughfare across his land "to shorten the distance to the drawbridge, which stood where Blackstone Street now crosses Hanover Street," wrote Edward Griffin Porter in 1887.

Points of interest on the street (all on its eastern side) include one of the oldest brick buildings in the city, the Ebenezer Hancock House, as well as the Boston Stone, the Green Dragon Tavern and part of Union Oyster House. Marshall House formerly stood on the street (not to be confused with an early business in the Ebenezer Hancock House). The building containing the Bell in Hand Tavern occupies the western side of the street.

== Gallery ==
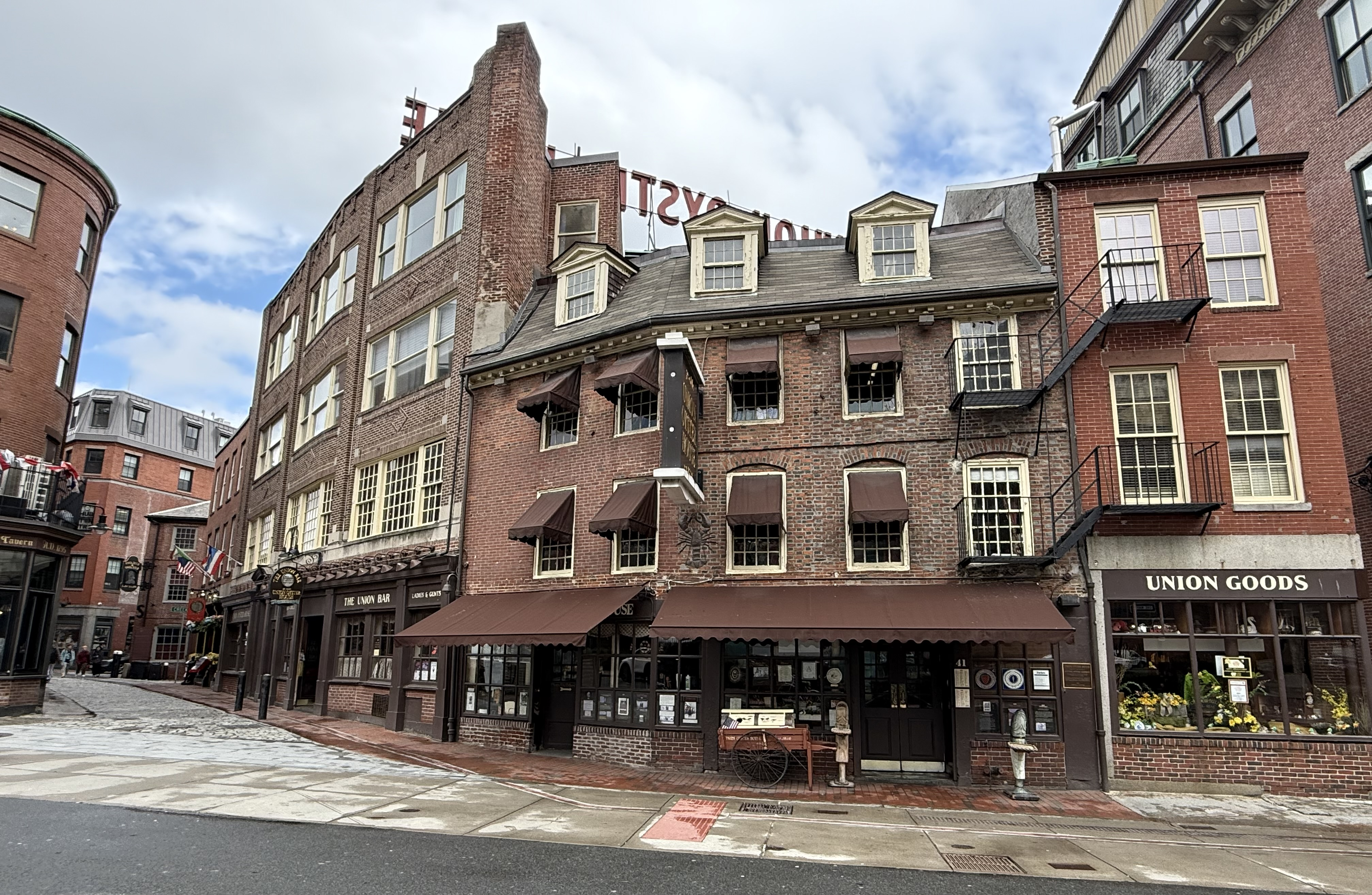
Marshall Street (left) in relation to Union Oyster House (2025)
