= Boston Stone =

Minor tourist attraction and historical site in Boston, Massachusetts

Coordinates: 42.36172°N 71.05685°W

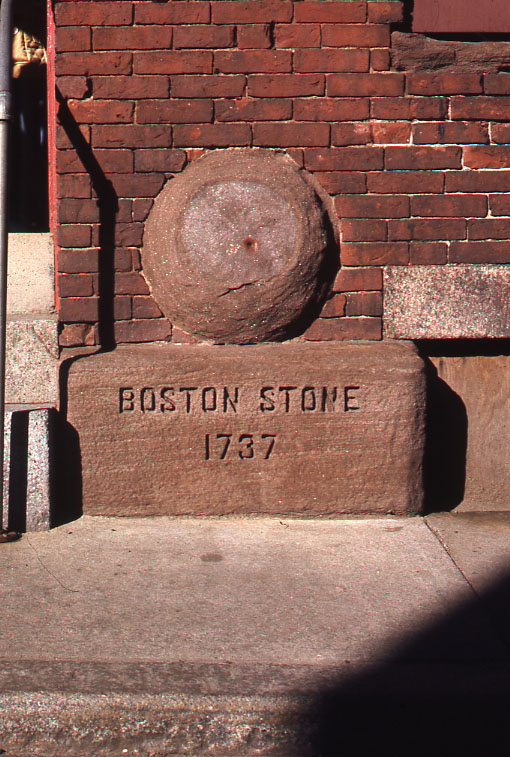
The Boston Stone in 1975

The Boston Stone is a stone in Boston, Massachusetts. It is near the Freedom Trail and is a minor tourist attraction.

The stone, a flattened sphere about 2 feet (0.61 m) in diameter, hollowed out on one side, is embedded in the foundation of a building on Marshall Street (a narrow alley named for Thomas Marshall) in the Blackstone Block Historic District. Below the stone is a plinth inscribed "Boston Stone 1737". It has been called "both an artifact of the early paint industry and evidence of early industrial activity in the vicinity..." It is considered the oldest paint-mill in the United States. There is no plaque, and the Boston Stone has no official status.

== History ==
The Boston Stone was originally a millstone also called a "muller" used for grinding paint pigments in a long stone trough. It was imported from England around 1701 by the painter Tom Childs. The stone was originally displayed with a painted plaque including Child’s initials and the date 1701.

Child’s estate was purchased by John Howe who found the stone while building the present building around 1737 and removed it to the corner of his property to keep vehicles from damaging the building. The stone was placed in the brick wall above another stone carved to read "Boston Stone 1737" when the building was rebuilt by James Davis in 1835. According to Howe’s daughter, a Mrs. Green, their neighbor who had seen the famous London Stone proposed that the paint mill be made into a similar landmark by adding the inscription. The new building popularized the old artifact; in 1839, the Boston Courier reported that a replica of the stone made entirely of sugar was exhibited at a fair at Quincy Market. In 1879 it was mentioned by poet John Greenleaf Whittier in his poem "Landmarks" lamenting the loss of some of Boston's early landmarks, stating "When from Neck to Boston Stone, All thy pride of place is gone."

According to popular legend, the stone is the geographic center of Boston, used in colonial times by surveyors as the zero point for outlying milestones showing the distance to Boston, but this is almost certainly not true. There are no contemporary records indicating this. Nineteenth century advertising for the Marshall House inn describes the original inscribing of the Boston Stone's plinth; it is possible that its attribution as Boston's zero milestone was an early 19th-century advertising ploy. The 1921 Rand, McNally guide to the city suggested that it was probably set up to provide directions to nearby shops in imitation of the London Stone.

== See also ==
- List of individual rocks
