= Giacomo's Ristorante =

Restaurant in Boston, Massachusetts, U.S.

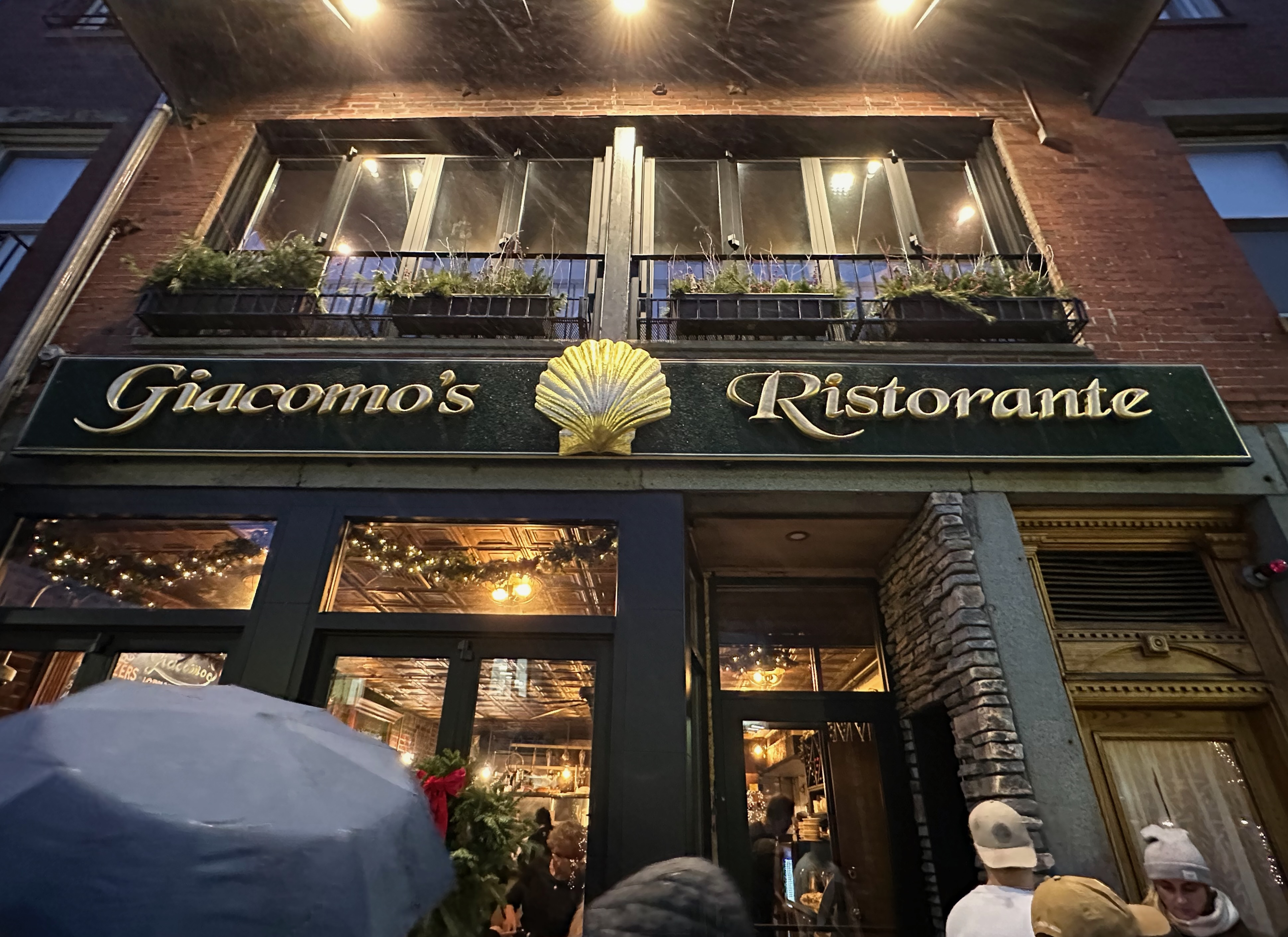
- Interactive map of Giacomo's Ristorante

Restaurant information
- Established: 1985 (41 years ago)
- Owners: Richard and Adriana Travaglione
- Food type: Italian
- Dress code: Casual
- Location: 355 Hanover Street, North End, Boston, Suffolk County, Massachusetts, 02113, United States
- Coordinates: 42.364527°N 71.053547°W
- Reservations: No
- Website: www.giacomosboston.com

Giacomo's Ristorante is a restaurant in the North End of Boston, Massachusetts. Located at 355 Hanover Street, it was opened in 1985 by Giacomo "Jackie" Taglieri. In 2023, it was ranked one of the best Italian restaurants in the U.S. by Tasting Table. It does not take reservations and is cash-only. It is owned by Richard and Adriana Travaglione, who also own another North End restaurant, Riccardo's.

It has two sister restaurants: Casa Giacomo's, at 431 Columbus Avenue in Downtown Boston, and Giacomo's Melrose, at 454 Main Street in Melrose.

== See also ==
- List of Italian restaurants
