= Thomas Marshall (settler) =

- Born: c. 1610
- Died: 1664 (aged 53 or 54)

Thomas Marshall (c. 1610–1664) was a 17th-century English emigrant to the New England Colonies. Marshall Street in Boston, Massachusetts, is now named for him.

== Early life ==
Marshall was born in Alford, Lincolnshire, England, around 1610 to Thomas Marshall and Janet Fidler. He worked as a cordwainer before emigraring to the Colony of Massachusetts Bay in 1634 with his sons, Thomas and Samuel. His first wife, Alva Eliakim, is believed to have died before their departure.

== Career ==
Marshall frequently appeared in records in Boston between 1634 and 1660 as a ferryman, a shoemaker, a land-owner, a selectman, a representative and a deacon of the First Church in Boston. He became a leading supporter of Anne Hutchinson and Reverend John Wheelwright.

== Personal life ==
Marshall had two known wives beyond his first; firstly, between around 1627 and 1634, he was married to Lydia Angram. She died in her early 30s. In 1637, he married Alice Mason, with whom he had two daughters, Sarah and Frances, and two sons. One of the latter, Eliakim, was killed in the Battle of Bloody Brook in 1675.

Also in 1637, Marshall was "convented for having his hand to the said seditious writing and, justifying the same, is also disfranchised." He was one of around 60 Boston men who were disarmed for their part in the controversy. Marshall did not immediately recant himself but, it is understood, he did eventually.

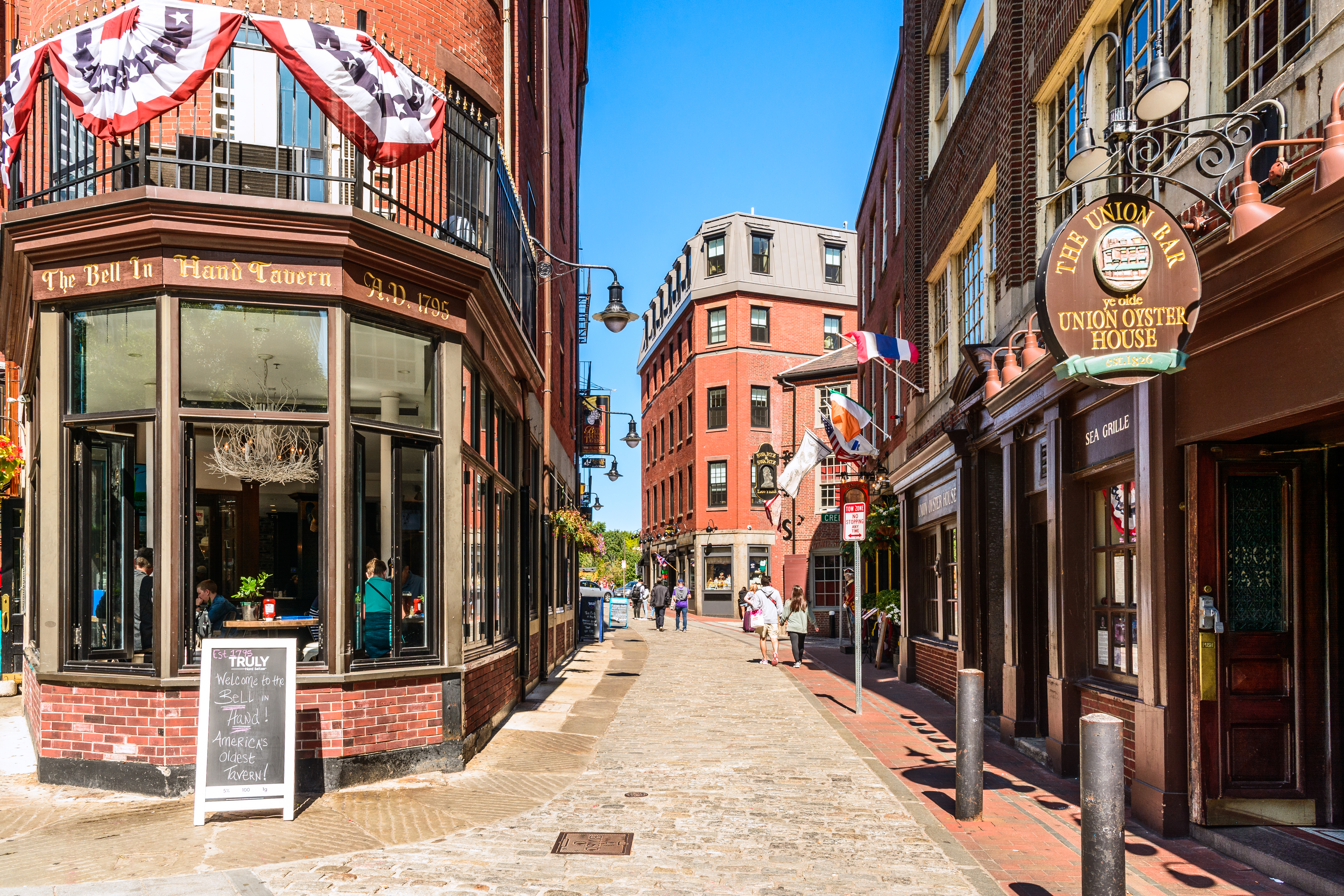
Marshall Street, Boston

He held the office of selectman between 1647 and 1658 and was a deacon and deputy in 1650.

In 1652, Marshall, who owned a home and garden on Boston's Hanover Street, offered to the city a thoroughfare across his land "to shorten the distance to the drawbridge, which stood where Blackstone Street now crosses Hanover Street," wrote Edward Griffin Porter in 1887. The street was Marshall's Lane (today's Marshall Street).

== Death ==
Marshall died in 1664, aged around 53. Alice died a short time before him.
