= Union Oyster House =

Restaurant in Boston, Massachusetts

- U.S. National Register of Historic Places
- U.S. National Historic Landmark
- U.S. Historic district – Contributing property
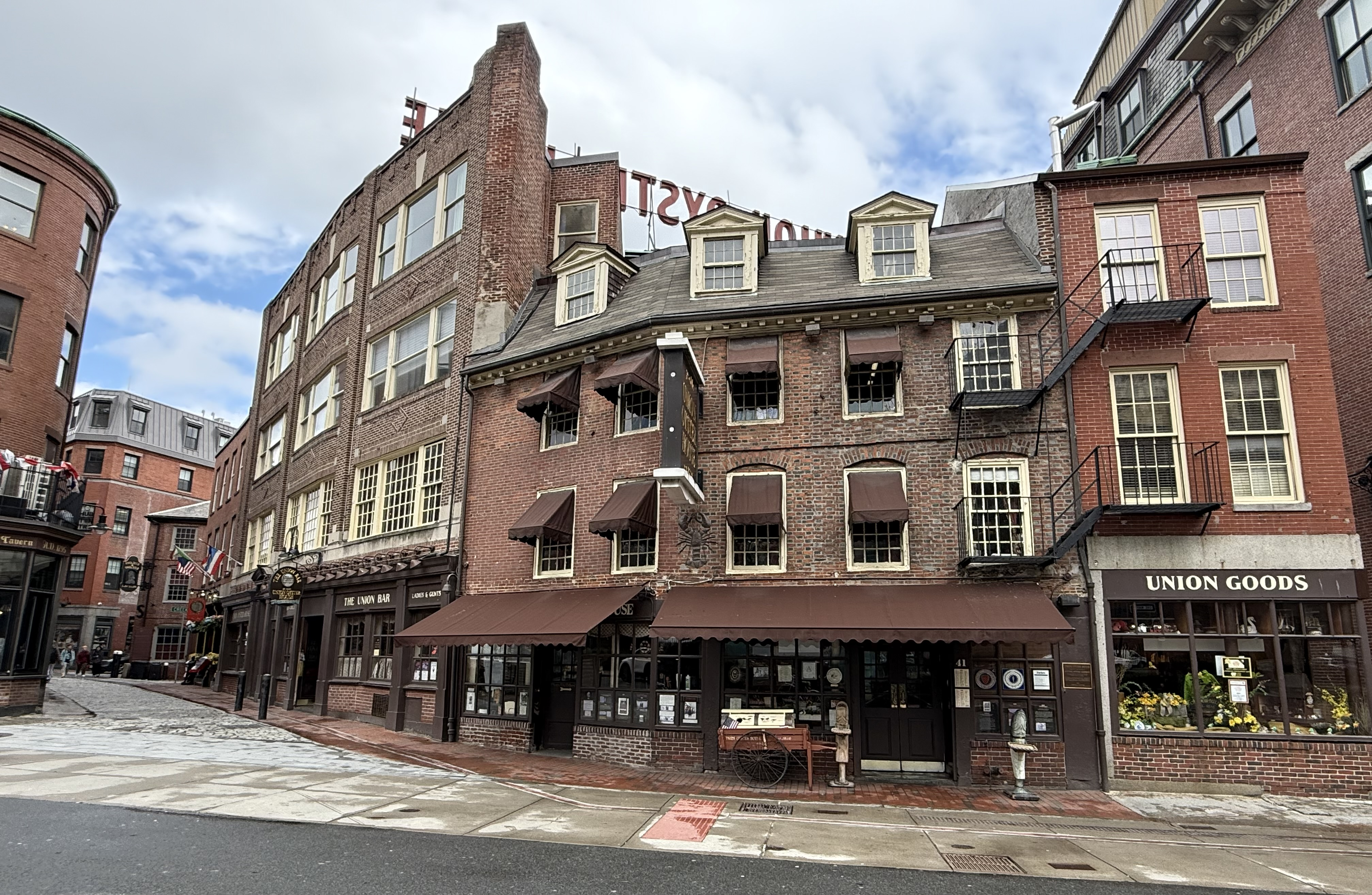
- Pictured in 2025
- Interactive map of Union Oyster House
- Location: 41–43 Union Street, Boston, Massachusetts
- Coordinates: 42°21′41″N 71°3′25″W
- Built: c. 1716 (310 years ago)
- Architectural style: Georgian
- Part of: Blackstone Block Historic District (ID73000315)
- NRHP reference No.: 03000645

Significant dates
- Added to NRHP: May 27, 2003
- Designated NHL: May 27, 2003
- Designated CP: May 26, 1973

Union Oyster House (previously known as The Old Oyster House and Ye Olde Oyster House) is a restaurant at 41–43 Union Street in Downtown Boston, Massachusetts. Now part of the Blackstone Block Historic District, it has been open to diners since 1826, making it among the oldest operating restaurants in the United States. It is the oldest known to have been continuously operating. The central building was listed as a National Historic Landmark in 2003.

== History ==
The restaurant's logo. It was refreshed in 2026 to recognize its 200th anniversary

The original building, which still stands between two later constructions, was completed around 1716. It has an angled front which follows the courses of Marshall Street (the two-bay section) and Union Street (three bays), matching the length of 36 feet (11 m) given in the deeds of 1737 to 1742. It is not known whether both sides were built at the same time; the vertical joint line in the brickwork between the two has led to some historians believing that the Marshall Street portion was built later. The fact that the second-floor joists are at right-angles to the summer beams, even with the angling of the Marshall Street section, suggests that the two sections were built concurrently.

In 1742, before it became a restaurant, Hopestill Capen's dry goods business, At the Sign of the Cornfields, occupied the property. In 1771, printer Isaiah Thomas published his newspaper, the Massachusetts Spy, on the second floor. Ebenezer Hancock, the first paymaster general of the Continental Army, used it as headquarters during the Revolutionary War. The restaurant originally opened as the Atwood & Bacon Oyster House on October 7, 1826. It was then that the oak (possibly mahogany) semi-circular oyster bar was installed. The inner section of the bar was originally soapstone but was covered in a copper sheet by the 1940s.

Around 1890, Charles Forster is believed to have introduced the toothpick to America at the restaurant. It is alleged that he offered some Harvard University scholars a free meal if they would request toothpicks after they ate. Forster chose Union Oyster House to test his scheme, and arranged for several well-dressed Harvard men to ask out loud for toothpicks. The restaurant began to offer them on small trays after meals.

The building's original two dormer windows were removed in 1895 and added again around 1938, including a third one above the section on Marshall Street before 1945. The slate roof was replaced by asphalt shingles in 1997, forty years after the roof sign was added.

A fire in 1951 engulfed the second floor.

The Union Oyster House has had several notable people in history as regular diners, including the Kennedy family, John F. Kerry and Daniel Webster. Webster was known for regularly consuming at least six plates of oysters. In 1796, Louis Philippe was living in exile on the second floor, today's Pine Room, which has an original fireplace in the front northern corner of the room. The future king earned his living by teaching French to young women. Labor economist and Haverford College president John Royston Coleman worked here incognito as a "salad-and-sandwich man" for a time in the 1970s and documented the experience in his book The Blue Collar Journal.

As of 2015, the restaurant was selling an estimated 60,000 plates of oysters each year (or 164 plates daily).

=== Expansions ===
The business has expanded into the adjacent buildings on either side of the 3.5-story (plus basement) original section. The building to the right of the original, at 37 Union Street (adjacent to the Yankee Publishing Building at number 33), was completed in 1851. In the 1880s, it was occupied by the launderette of either Oong Ar-Showe, the first naturalized Chinese immigrant to Boston, or one of his relatives. In the 1940s and 1950s, it was Potters Lunch. The building was purchased by the Union Oyster House's then-owners, the Milano family, in 1995. It houses the Union Goods merchandise store.

The bar expansion is to the south, at 14–22 Marshall Street and facing Bell in Hand Tavern. This building, completed in 1916, was purchased by the Milanos, in 1982. The Union Bar was opened in August 1983.

== Owners ==
Between 1826 and 1913, the Atwood family owned the business. They sold it to the Fitzgerald family, who changed the name of the business to Union Oyster House. In 1940, the Greaves brothers became the new owners. Thirty years later, they sold it to the Milano family, who own it as of 2025. Joe Milano inherited the business from his father after working alongside him from August 1970.

The restaurant celebrated its 200th anniversary in March 2026. That August, the restaurant was sold to the Fertitta family of Texas.

== Recognition ==
The restaurant was named North America's Best Landmark Restaurant at the World Culinary Awards in 2020, 2024 and 2025.

== Gallery ==
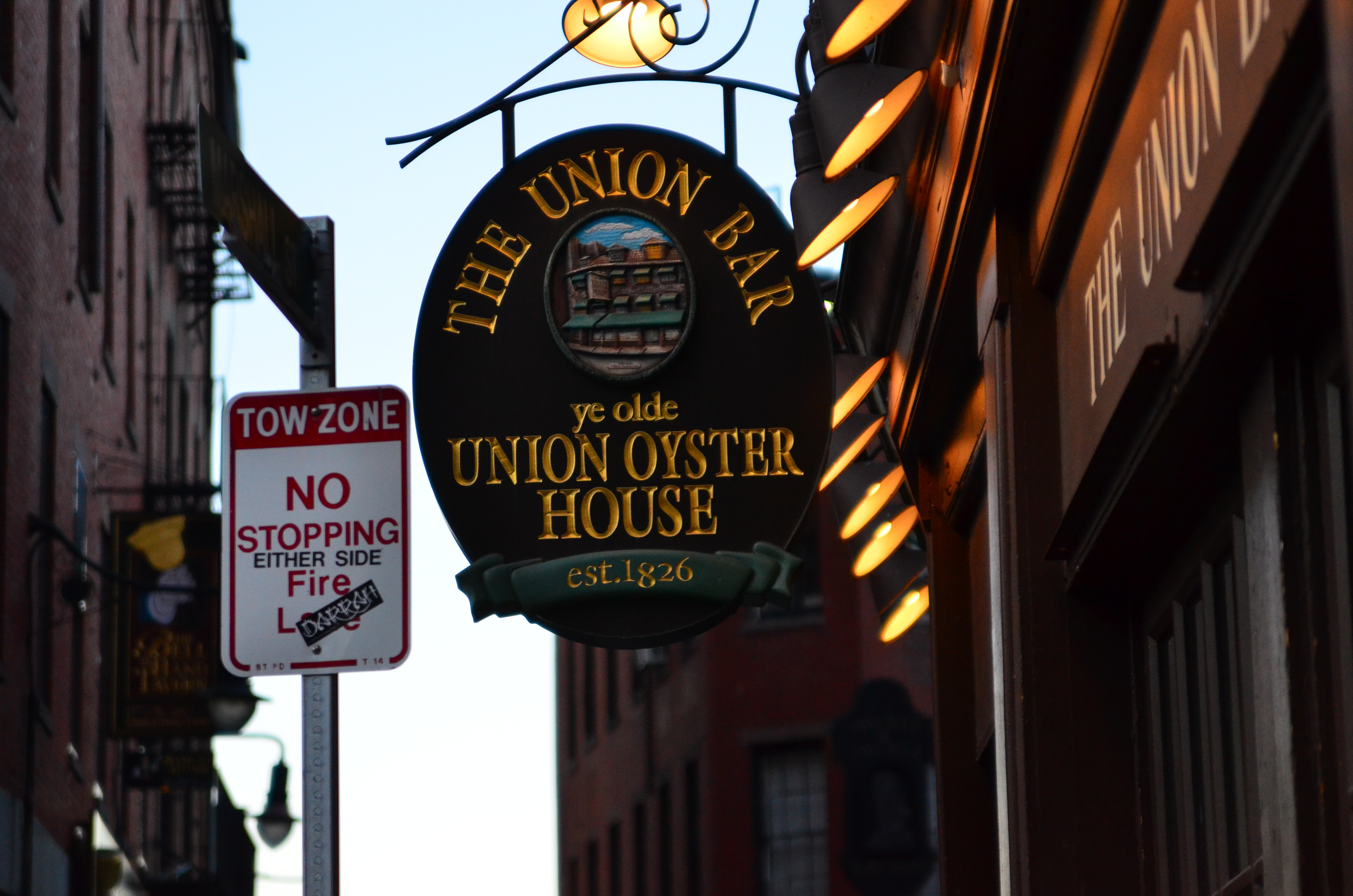
Signage

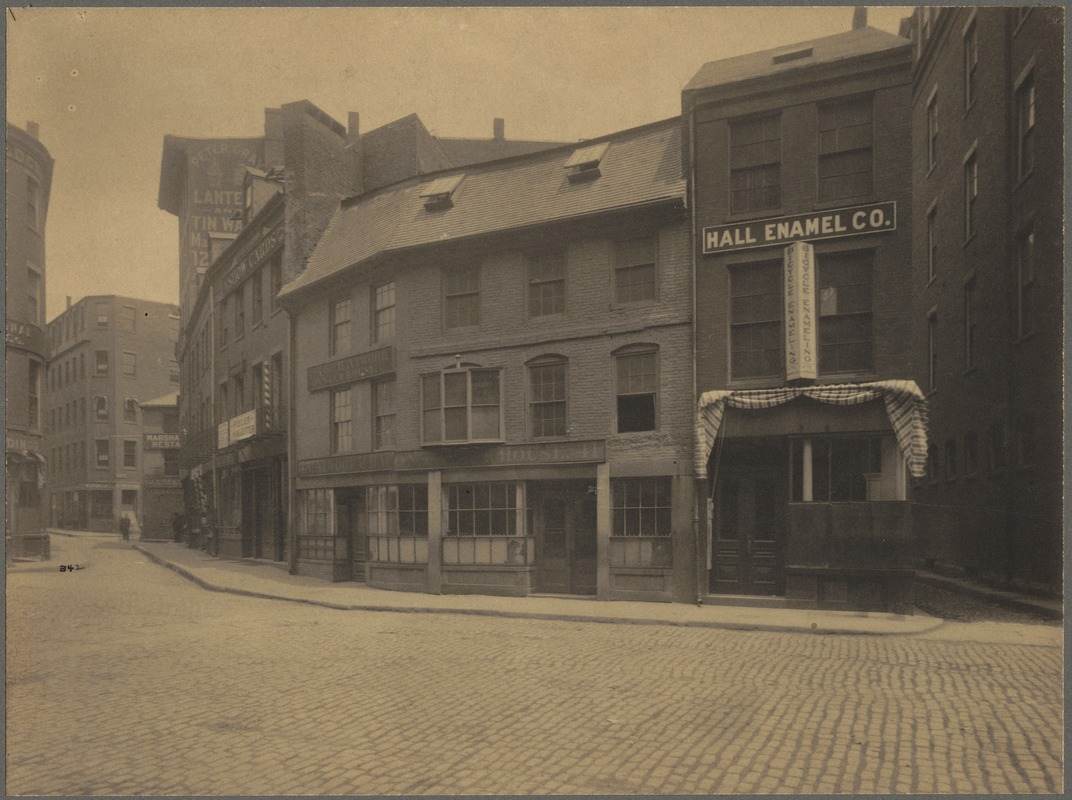
1898 view

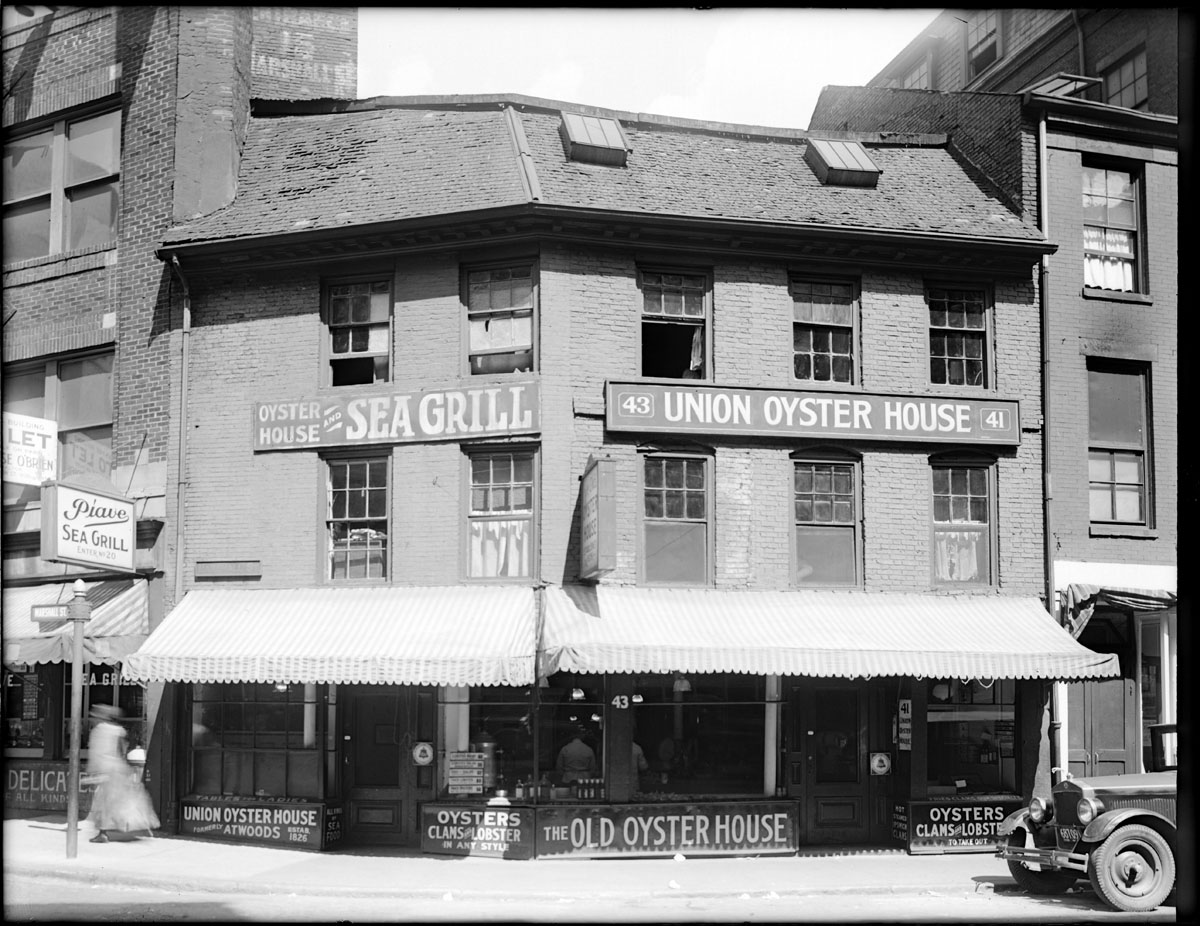
1930

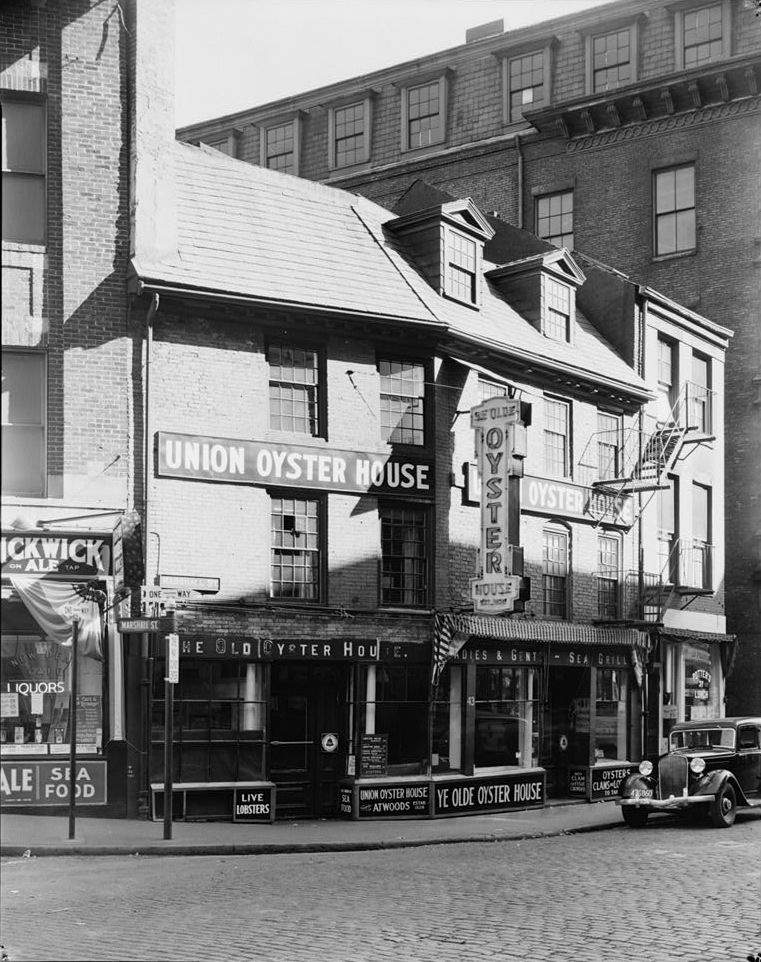
1945

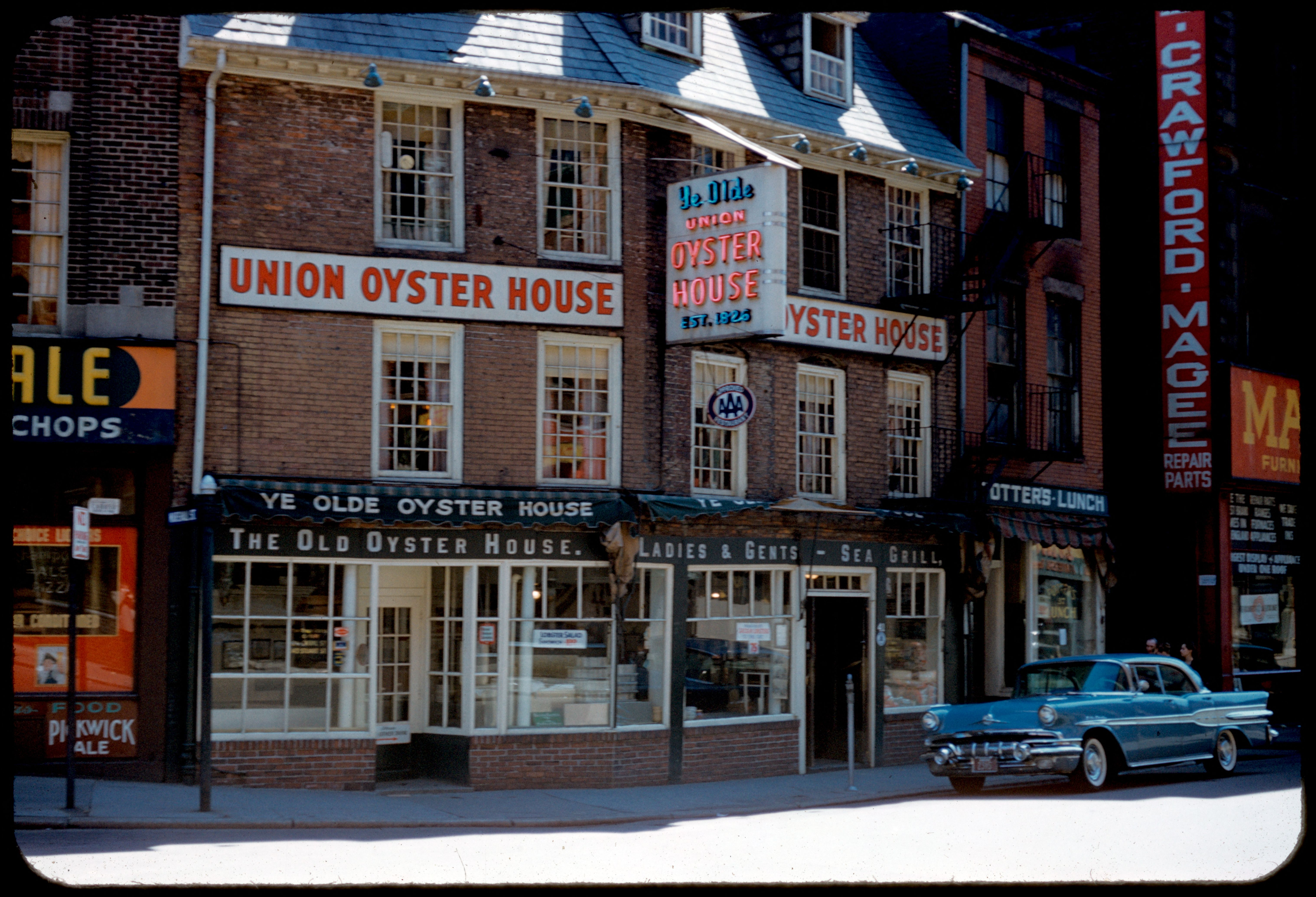
1959

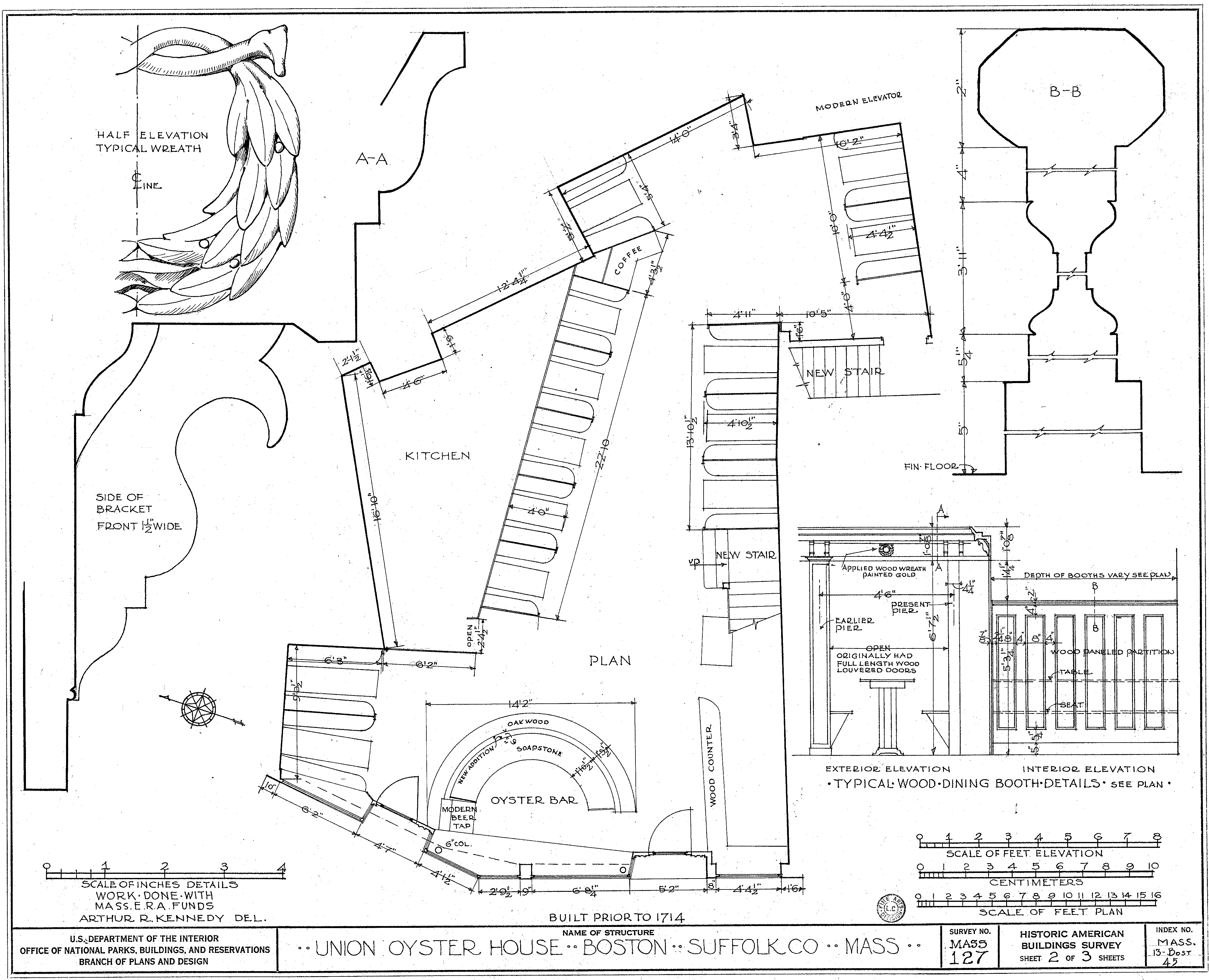
First-floor plan and details

== See also ==
- List of the oldest restaurants in the United States
- Cuisine of New England
- List of National Historic Landmarks in Boston
- List of seafood restaurants
- National Register of Historic Places listings in northern Boston, Massachusetts
- Ebenezer Clough, mason, who is believed to have worked on the building's construction
