= Ebenezer Hancock =

American patriot

- Born: November 15, 1741; Quincy, Province of Massachusetts Bay
- Died: March 12, 1819 (aged 77); Boston, Massachusetts, U.S.
- Burial place: Granary Burying Ground, Boston
- Spouse: Elizabeth Lowell (1767–1819; his death)
- Parent(s): John Hancock Jr. Mary Hawke Thaxter
- Relatives: John Hancock

Ebenezer Hancock (November 15, 1741 – March 12, 1819) was an American patriot. He was a younger brother of John Hancock, a signer of the Declaration of Independence in 1776.

== Early life ==
Hancock was born in 1741 to Reverend John Hancock Jr. and Mary Hawke Thaxter. Mary was John's second husband, after the death of Samuel Thaxter Jr. in 1732. Hancock's siblings were Mary and John. Hancock's father died when Hancock was two years old, and his mother married for a third time, to Reverend Daniel Perkins.

He attended Harvard College, graduating in 1760.

== Personal life ==
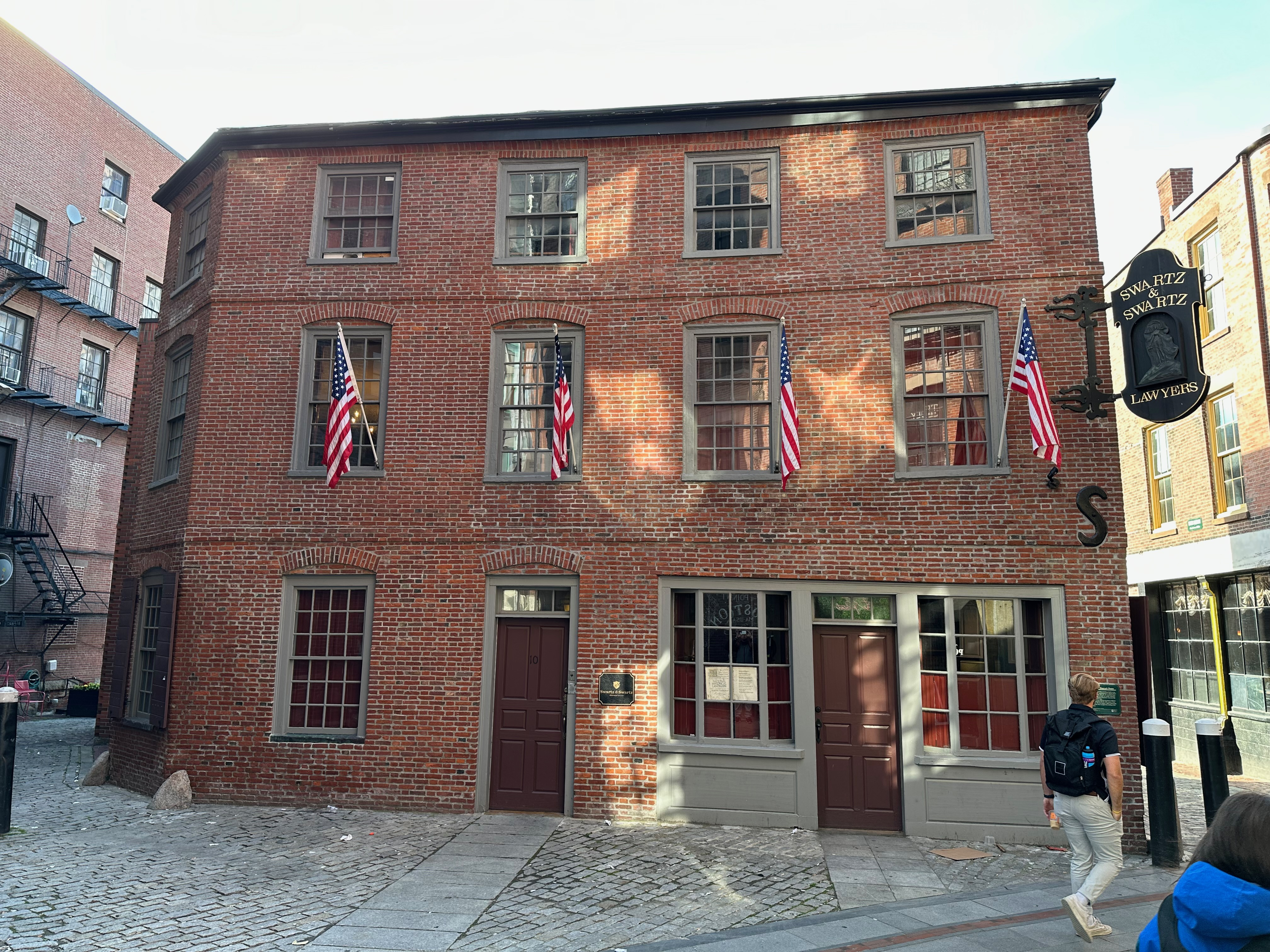
The Ebenezer Hancock House, pictured here when it was beyond 250 years old.

Hancock lived on Middlecott Street in Boston's Beacon Hill neighborhood, in a home inherited from his uncle, Thomas Hancock. Ebenezer worked at what is today known as the Ebenezer Hancock House on Marshall Street, near Faneuil Hall, which was built for his uncle in 1767. Thomas willed the property to his nephew, John, in the mid-1760s. John transferred the building's title in 1776 to Ebenezer.

The same year, Hancock married Elizabeth Lowell, with the ceremony officiated by Reverend Charles Chauncy. They had two known children: Thomas in 1769 and John II in 1774.

During the siege of Boston in 1775 and 1776, Hancock and his family lived at Reverend Jonas Clarke's house in Lexington, a building today known as the Hancock–Clarke House.

== Career ==
Hancock was Keeper of the Powder House in Boston, Deputy Paymaster-General for the Eastern Department of the Continental Army, a fire warden, Inspector of the Massachusetts Mint and a town selectman. In his Continental Army role, he used what is now Union Oyster House, a few steps from the Ebenezer Hancock House, as his headquarters. He had vacated the building by 1785, when it was the home of Ebenezer Frothingham.

== Death ==
Hancock died in 1819, aged 77. He was interred in a family tomb in the Granary Burying Ground, Boston. His widow survived him by eight years and was interred beside him.
