= Oong Ar-Showe =

Chinese merchant in Boston

- Born: c. 1825; China
- Other name: Charles Ar-Showe
- Occupation: Merchant
- Spouse: Louisa M. Heuss (or Hentz) (m. 1853–1877/78; her death)

Oong Ar-Showe (also known as Charles Ar-Showe; born c. 1825) was a successful tea merchant in Boston, Massachusetts. He was the first Chinese man to reside in the city and possibly the first naturalized United States citizen from China.

== Early life and emigration ==
In 1846, Ar-Showe was working with two compatriots on the Cincinnati, a ship under the authority of a Captain Ryan. Upon arrival in Boston in 1847, the three men were noticed by a Mr. Halliburton, owner of Redding & Company, a tea store on Washington Street. After inviting them into his home, he offered them employment in his company, believing that their nationality could only help his industry. Ar-Showe was the only one of the three to accept the role. Ar-Showe adopted an American name, Charles, after hearing that was the name of Halliburton's brother. He was christened at St. Matthew's Episcopal Church in Dorchester, Boston.

== Career ==
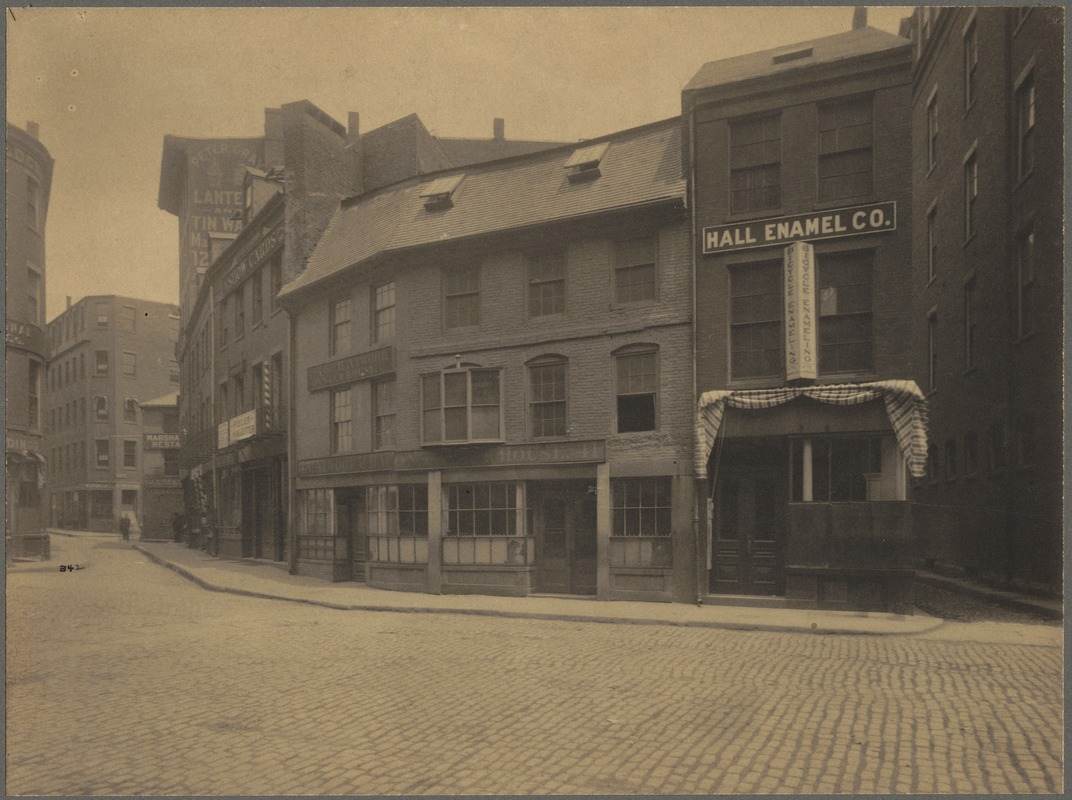
Ar-Showe owned a tea and coffee business in the building at the right of this 1898 photo, beside Union Oyster House

Ar-Showe became a popular merchant in Boston, and was named "the best judge of teas in this country" by The Boston Post, but he left his role with Redding & Company and began working for P. T. Barnum. He traveled with him to the World's Fair as an interpreter for a Chinese family. He traveled around Europe for eighteen months, before returning to Boston.

In 1852, he opened Oong Ar-Showe & Company, a store selling tea and coffee, received from his agents in Canton, Massachusetts. It was located on Union Street, in a structure which has since become part of Union Oyster House. He had a branch store at 76 State Street in Albany, New York, which burned down in 1853.

== Personal life ==
In South Boston in 1853, Ar-Showe married Louisa M. Heuss (possibly Hentz), a German native whom Mr. Halliburton had employed to help Ar-Showe learn English. They had one son, William, in 1854, and two daughters. They later moved from South Boston to Malden, where another Chinese man, Ar Soon, was a resident.

In 1860, Ar-Showe became a naturalized U.S. citizen, likely the first ever to do so. By 1870, he was among the top 1 per cent of wealthy Americans. In his free time, Ar-Showe could be seen flying kites on Boston Common.

Louisa died in 1877 or 1878, leading to Ar-Showe returning to China for two years. After a brief stop back in Malden, he returned to his homeland permanently. His children remained in the U.S.

In the 1880s, Cheong Mong Cham, the first Chinese student to attend the Massachusetts Institute of Technology, became a ward of Ar-Showe.
