= Ebenezer Hancock House =

- U.S. Historic district – Contributing property
- Boston Landmark
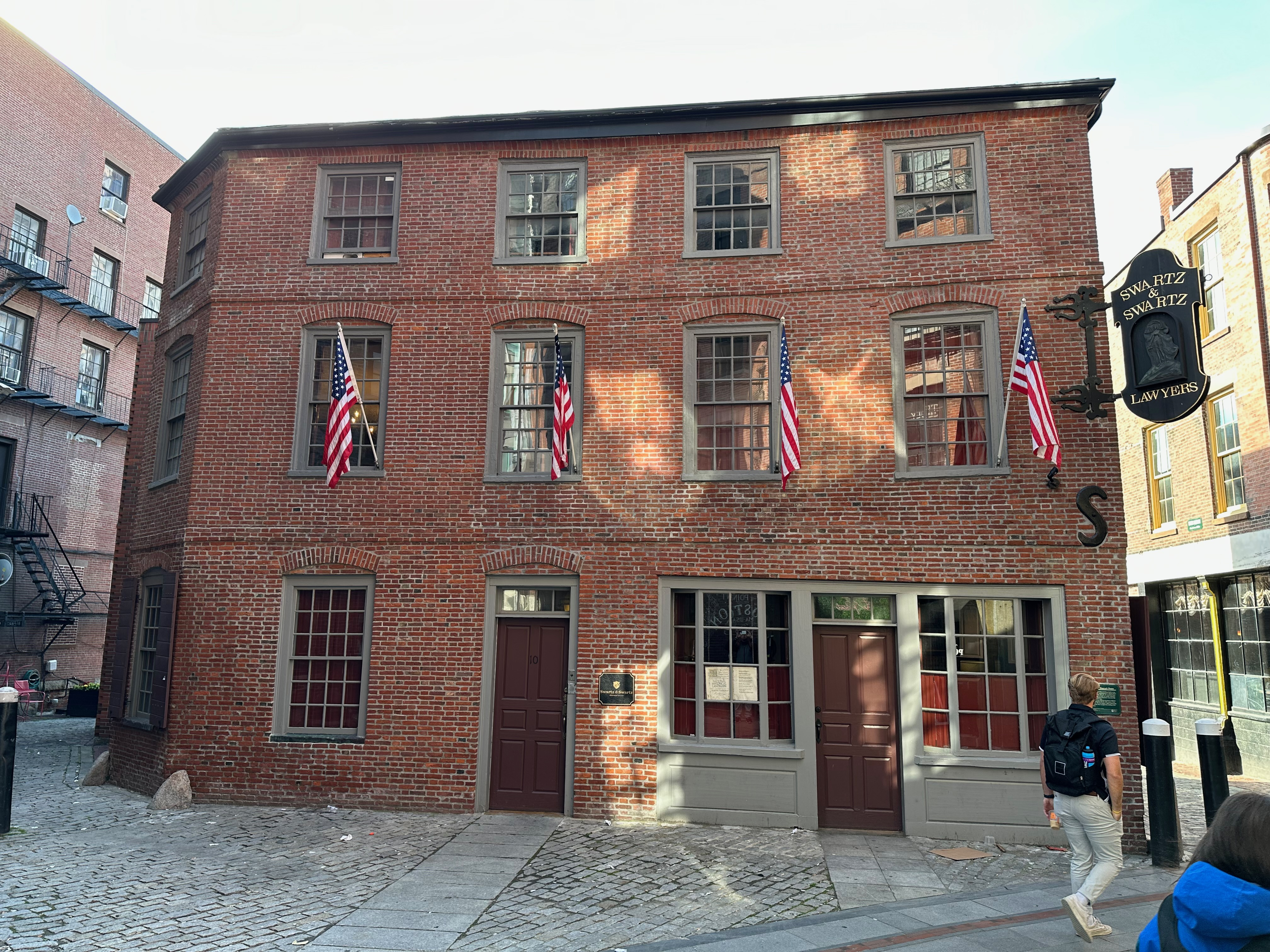
- Pictured in 2023
- Interactive map of Ebenezer Hancock House
- Location: 10 Marshall Street, Boston, Massachusetts, U.S.
- Coordinates: 42.36162°N 71.05676°W
- Built: 1767 (259 years ago)
- Part of: Blackstone Block Historic District (ID73000315)
- Designated BOSL: July 5, 1978

The Ebenezer Hancock House is a building at 10 Marshall Street in Downtown Boston, Massachusetts. Located Creek Square, in the city's Blackstone Block Historic District, at the corner of Marshall Street and Creek Lane, the building was erected in 1767 as a home for John Hancock, Ebenezer's brother.

== History ==
Thomas Hancock, who owned the site in the mid-18th century, willed it to his nephew, John, in 1764. Built by John in 1767, he transferred the building's title in 1776 to his brother, Ebenezer, who was Deputy Paymaster-General of the Continental Army. In 1785, the three-story building was owned by a city merchant, Ebenezer Frothingham.

It was later used as an inn where guests such as George Washington and Gilbert du Motier, Marquis de Lafayette, are believed to have stayed. In 1778, the French silver crowns Admiral Charles Henri Hector, Count of Estaing, brought into Boston, as back payment to Washington's Eastern Continental Army, were stored in the house. A business has occupied part of the ground floor since the late 18th century, including as the nation's longest continuously running shoe store (between 1798 and 1963), established by Benjamin Fuller. As of 2023, it was the home of lawyers Swartz and Swartz.

The remainder of the first floor and, it is believed, all of the upper levels, were a restaurant and tavern during the 19th and 20th centuries. Those floors have also been used as a boarding house, an officer's club and a museum.

Around 1840, the roof was slated. At the time, a Mr. Learned had a shop in the right-hand corner which he had been operating since 1821. He followed a business owned by a Mr. Fuller.

In 1929, an addition was added on the left, creating an ell. The ell was extended back in 1942, covering an original window.

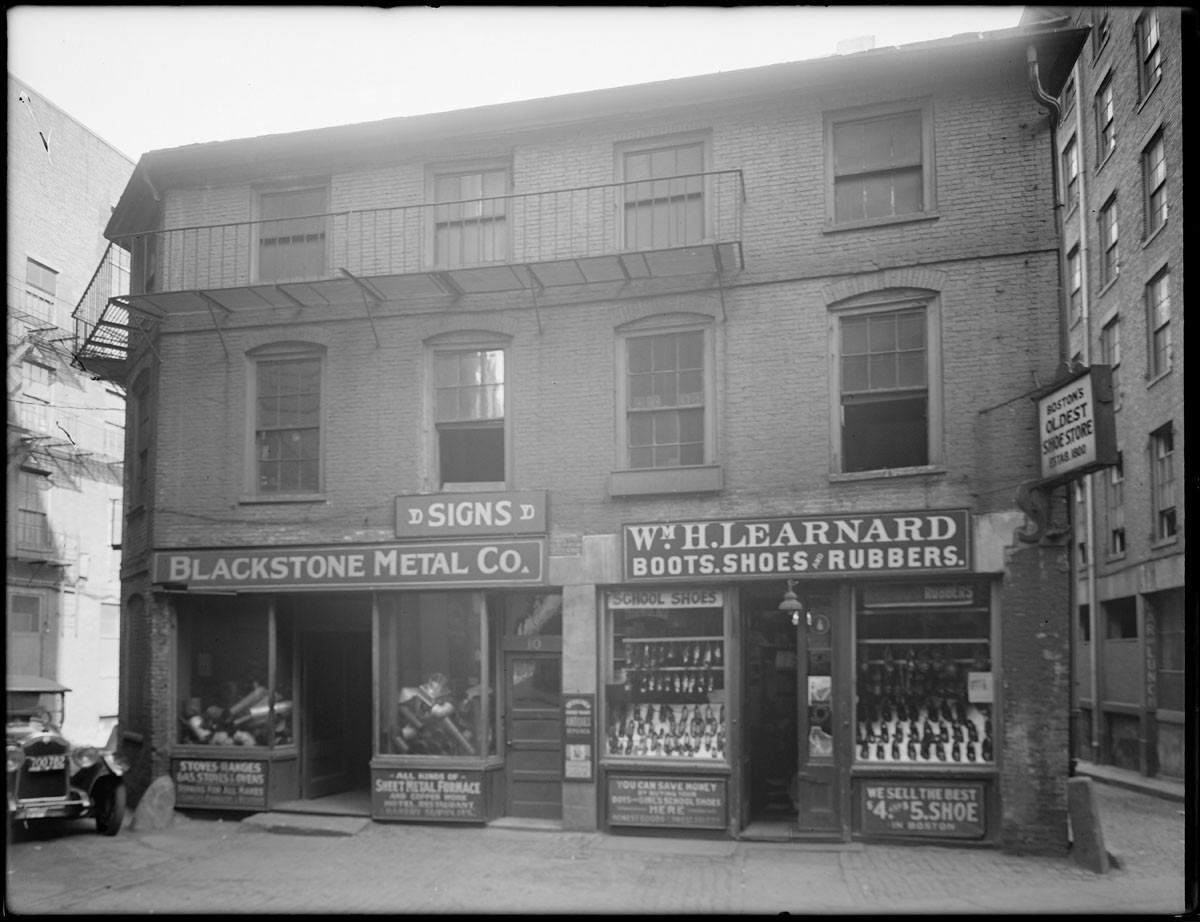
Pictured in 1930

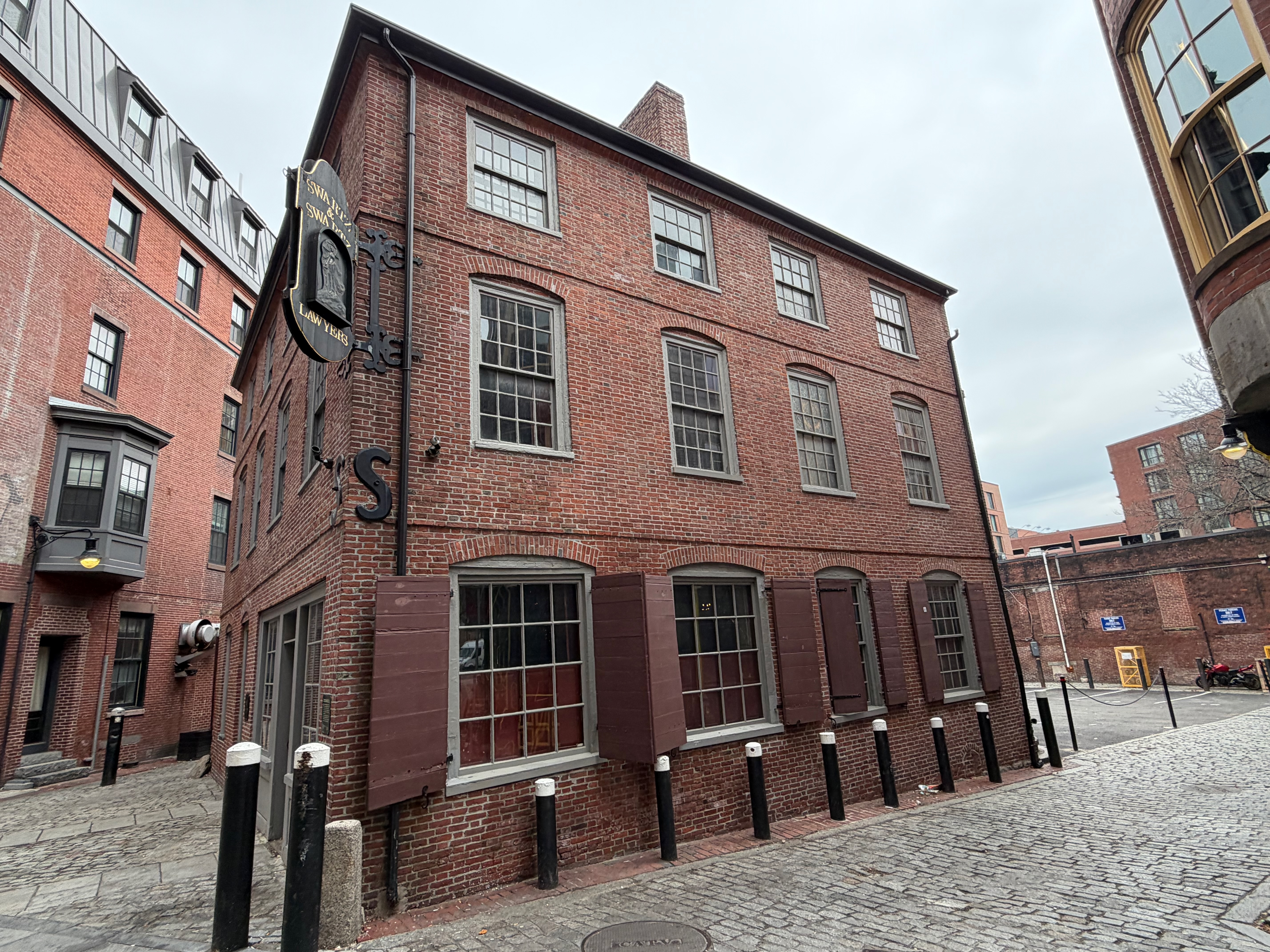
Southern elevation, facing the Green Dragon Tavern

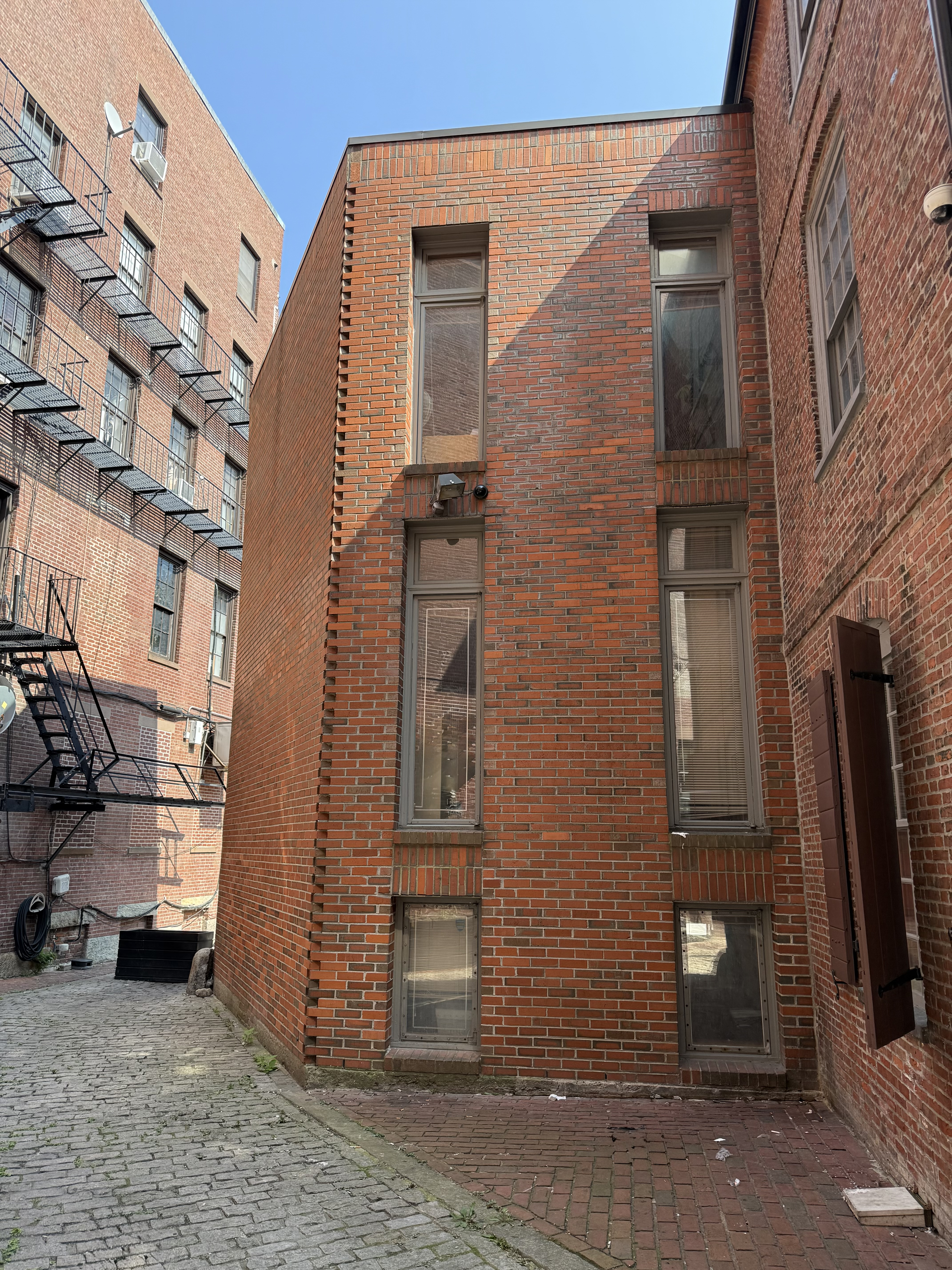
1929 addition

== See also ==
- List of National Historic Landmarks in Boston
- National Register of Historic Places listings in northern Boston, Massachusetts
