= Blackstone Block Historic District =

Historic district in Massachusetts, United States

- U.S. National Register of Historic Places
- U.S. Historic district
- Boston Landmark
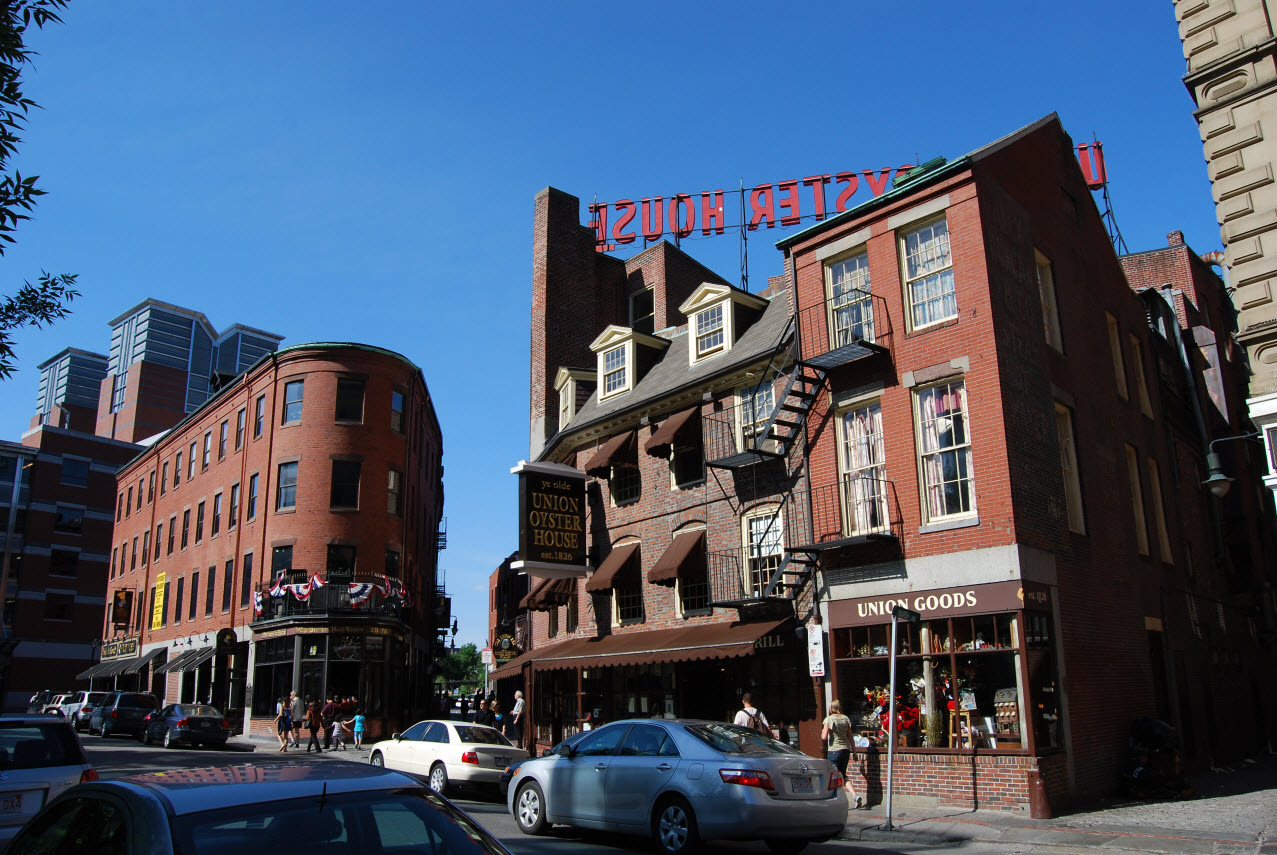
- Bell in Hand Tavern (left) and Union Oyster House

- Location within Boston Location within Massachusetts Location within the United States
- Location: Boston, Massachusetts
- Coordinates: 42°21′40″N 71°3′25″W
- Area: 2.3 acres (0.93 ha)
- Architectural style: Mid 19th Century Revival, Late Victorian, Federal
- NRHP reference No.: 73000315

Significant dates
- Added to NRHP: May 26, 1973
- Designated BOSL: April 26, 1983

The Blackstone Block Historic District encompasses what was once a waterfront business area in Boston, Massachusetts. Due to the infill of land it is now slightly inland from the waterfront. The district is bounded by Union, Hanover, Blackstone, and North Streets, just north of Quincy Market and Faneuil Hall. It includes the Union Oyster House, a National Historic Landmark building erected around 1716, and a collection of commercial buildings dating from the late 18th and 19th centuries. The district was added to the National Register of Historic Places in 1973. It also includes the circa-1770 Ebenezer Hancock House (10 Marshall Street), a Federal-style wood-frame house that is the only building left in the city which was known to be owned by John Hancock. The building was designated a Boston Landmark by the Boston Landmarks Commission on July 5, 1978, for its notable exterior and interiors. On April 26, 1983, the surrounding c. 1676 Blackstone Block Street Network was also designated by the Boston Landmarks Commission.

In the 17th century, the area that is now the Blackstone Block was adjacent to Town Cove, the major port facility of the town of Boston prior to the construction of Long Wharf. Town Cove is the area now occupied by Quincy Market to the north. Furthermore, it was from this area that the rest of Boston was platted, with the "Boston Stone" marking the start of the original surveys still present, embedded in the wall of a 19th-century building on Marshall Street. The pattern of alleys and streets within the block are also a rare reflection of historic street patterns, since most of Boston's streets have been widened to accommodate modern traffic.

== See also ==
- National Register of Historic Places listings in northern Boston, Massachusetts
