= Green Dragon Tavern =

Historic public house in Boston

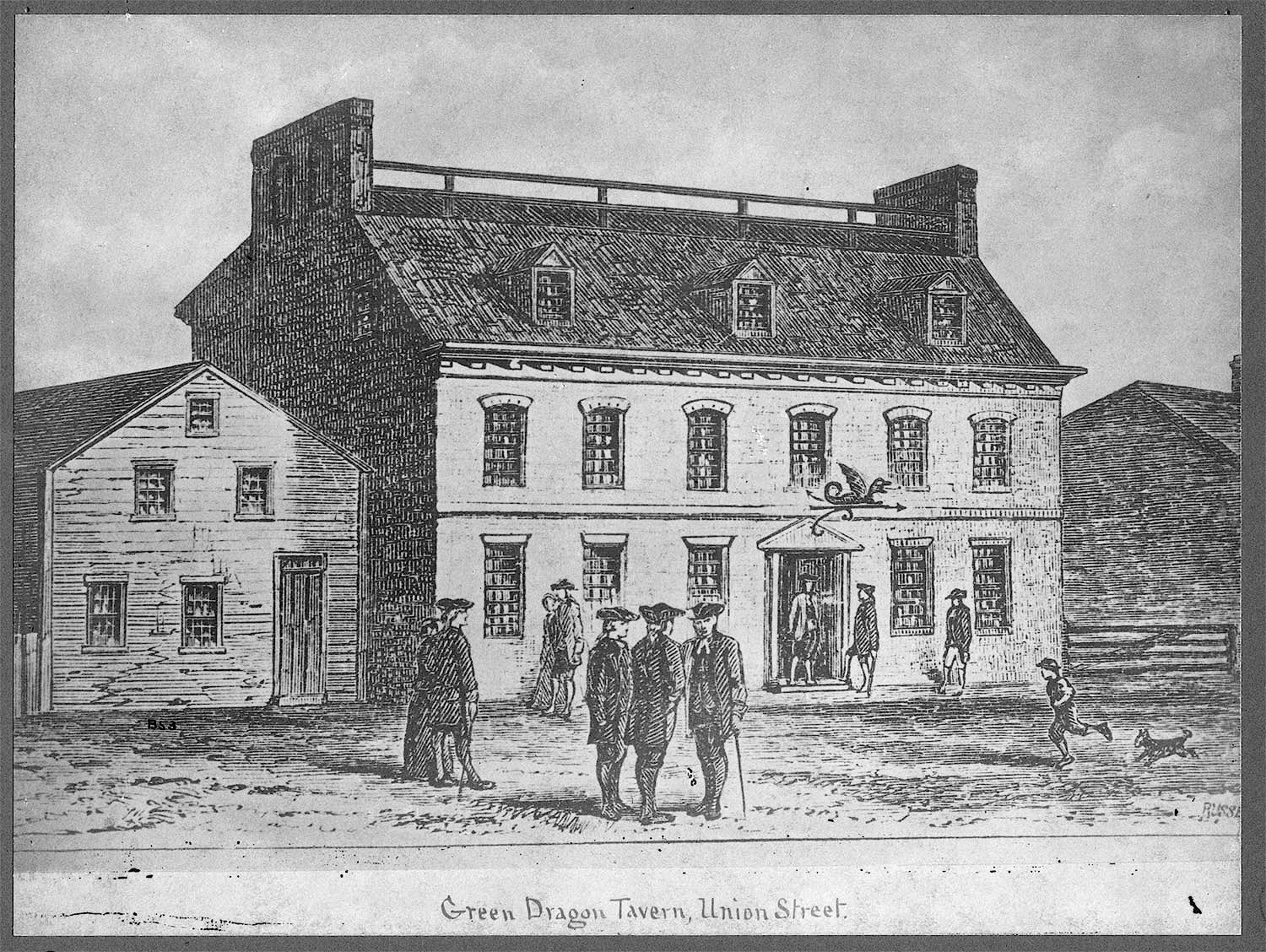
- Engraving of the Green Dragon Tavern, c. 1898
- Interactive map of Green Dragon Tavern
- Address: 11 Marshall Street
- Location: Boston, Massachusetts
- Coordinates: 42°21′39.31″N 71°3′24.92″W
- Type: Public house

Construction
- Demolished: 1832

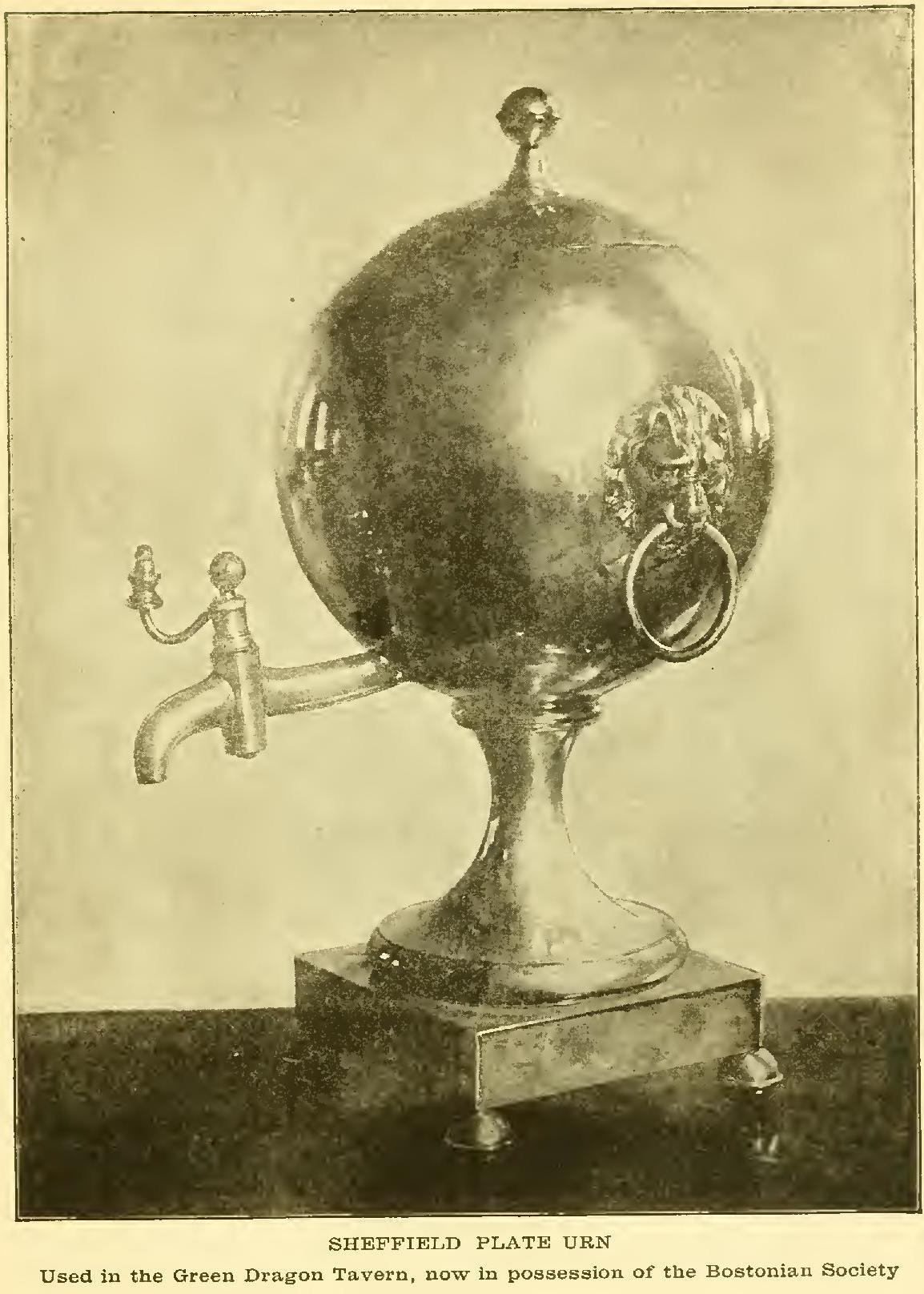
SHEFFIELD PLATE URN Used in the Green Dragon Tavern, now in possession of the Bostonian Society"- 1917 photo from book entitled, Old Boston Taverns and Tavern Clubs

The Green Dragon Tavern was a public house located on Green Dragon Lane (today's Union Street) in Boston, Massachusetts. A popular meeting place for both the Freemasons and the Sons of Liberty, it was demolished in 1832.

== History ==
The property had been inherited by Mehitable (Minot) Cooper from her uncle, William Stoughton, in 1701; Stoughton himself had acquired the property some time before June 1676. Valued at 650 pounds in 1705, the Green Dragon Tavern was purchased from her son, William, by physician and pamphleteer William Douglas in 1743. Douglas lived in the tavern, calling it his "mansion house". After his death in 1752, the tavern passed to his sister, who sold it to the St. Andrews Lodge of Freemasons in 1766. The Masons used the first floor for their meeting rooms led by Grand Master of the St. Andrew’s Grand Lodge, Joseph Warren. The basement tavern was used by several secret groups and became known by historians as the "Headquarters of the Revolution". The Sons of Liberty led by Samuel Adams, Boston Committee of Correspondence and the Boston Caucus each met there. Though membership in the Sons of Liberty was secret, it is widely believed to have included Samuel Adams, Dr. Joseph Warren, Paul Revere, John Hancock, James Otis, and Benjamin Edes (owner of the influential Boston Gazette).

The Boston Tea Party was planned there, and Paul Revere (a Mason) was sent from there to Lexington on his midnight ride. In January 1788, a meeting of the mechanics and artisans of Boston passed a series of resolutions urging the importance of adopting the Federal Constitution pending at the time before a convention of delegates from around Massachusetts. The building was demolished in 1832. A warehouse was built in its place. On August 19, 1892, a commemorative plaque was placed:

On this spot stood
THE GREEN DRAGON TAVERN
The secret meet place of the
Sons of Liberty,
And in the words of Webster, the
Headquarters of the Revolution.
To mark a site forever as
Memorable as the birthplace of American freedom,
this tablet is placed by the
Massachusetts Society of the Sons of Revolution.

== Structure ==
The Green Dragon Tavern was located at Green Dragon Lane (today's Union Street) in Boston's North End. At 0.75 acres (0.30 ha) in size, it was one of the largest structures in Boston. Primarily composed of brick, the building had three floors in the back and two in front; greeting visitors was a copper dragon mounted on an iron crane.

== Legacy ==
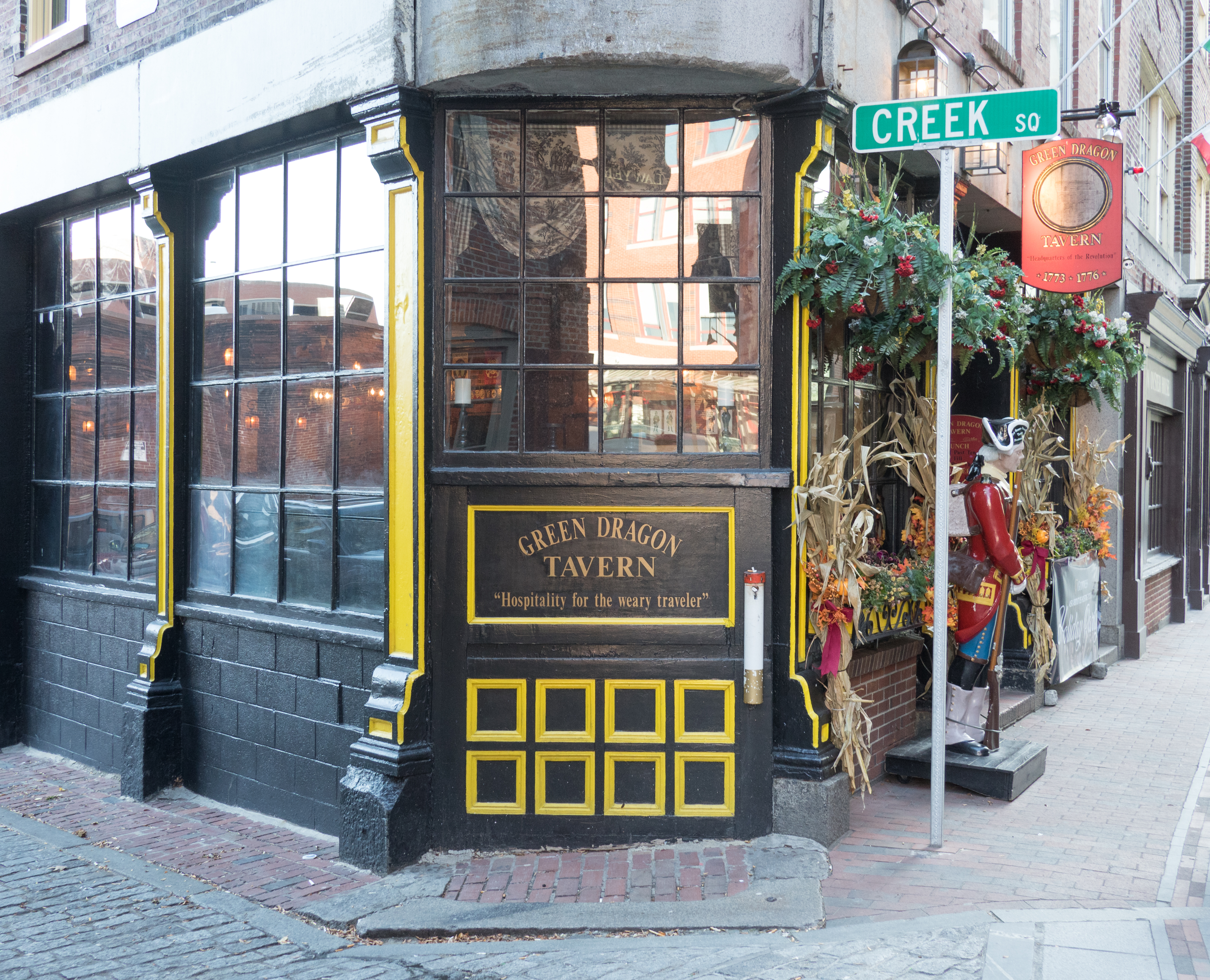
The "new" Green Dragon Tavern.

According to Steven D. Barleen in The Tavern (2019), "no tavern from this era (pre-Revolution) is as famous or as important in American history" as the Green Dragon Tavern. A pub, self-styled as the "new" Green Dragon Tavern, is located in 11 Marshall Street, adjacent to Union Street.

== See also ==
- List of former public houses and coffeehouses in Boston
