= Bell in Hand Tavern =

Bar in Boston

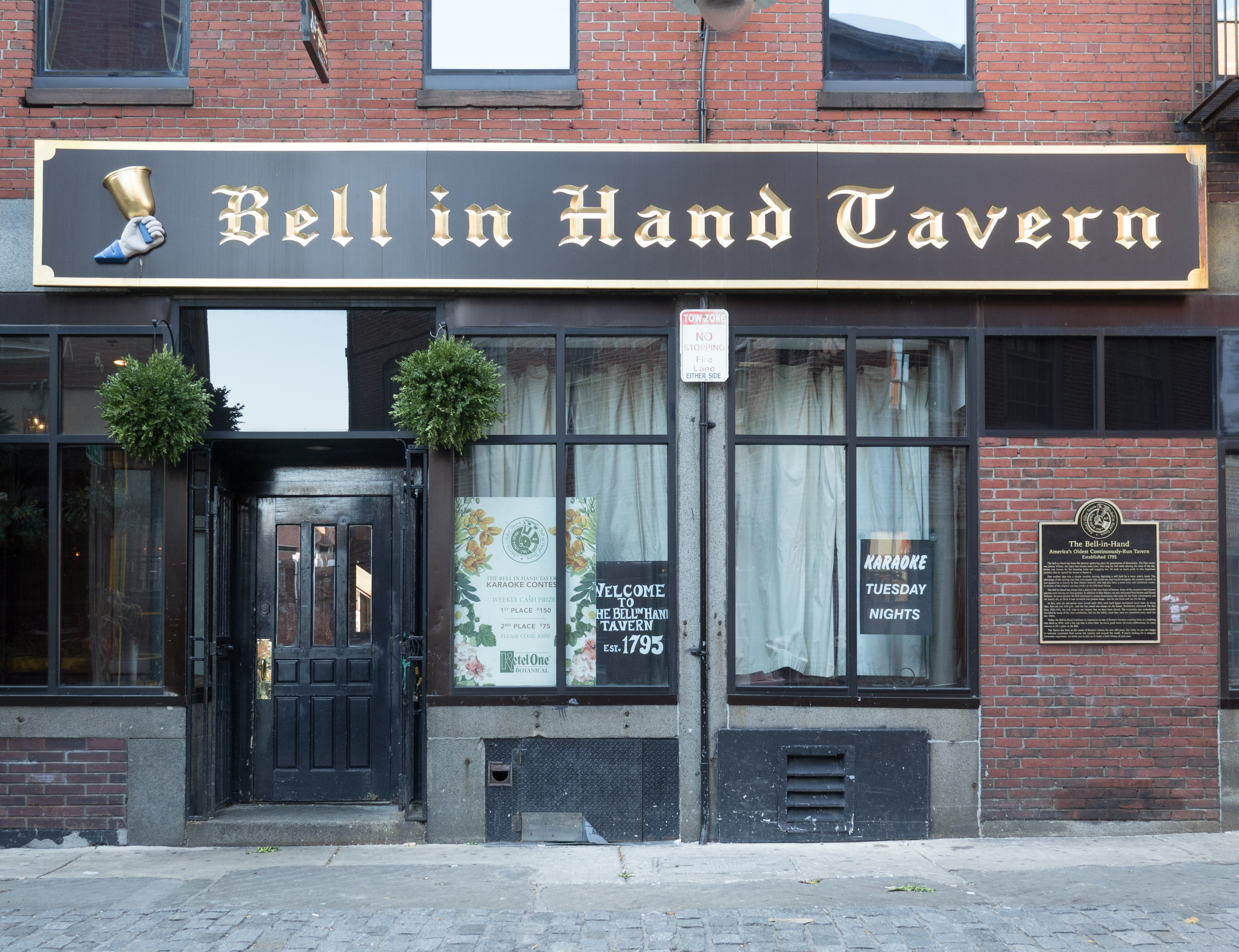
- Pictured in 2019
- Interactive map of Bell in Hand Tavern

Restaurant information
- Location: 45 Union Street, Boston, Massachusetts, U.S.
- Coordinates: 42.3617°N 71.0571°W

Bell in Hand Tavern is a bar located on Union Street in Boston, Massachusetts. It is one of the oldest bars in the United States.

== History ==
Tradition has it that the Bell in Hand was established in 1795 by Boston town crier James "Jimmy" Wilson. Its name refers to the hand-held bell he used to carry around while doing his job.

Wilson spent his latter years managing the tavern. It quickly became a spot for discussing local news and gossip. Early patrons included political figures such as Daniel Webster. The tavern was originally located near Boston City Hall. It was relocated to Williams Court/Pi Alley, then to 81 Devonshire Street. It is presently located on Union Street.

Bell in Hand Tavern is believed to be the oldest continuously operating bar in the United States; however, the bar stopped operating during the Prohibition.

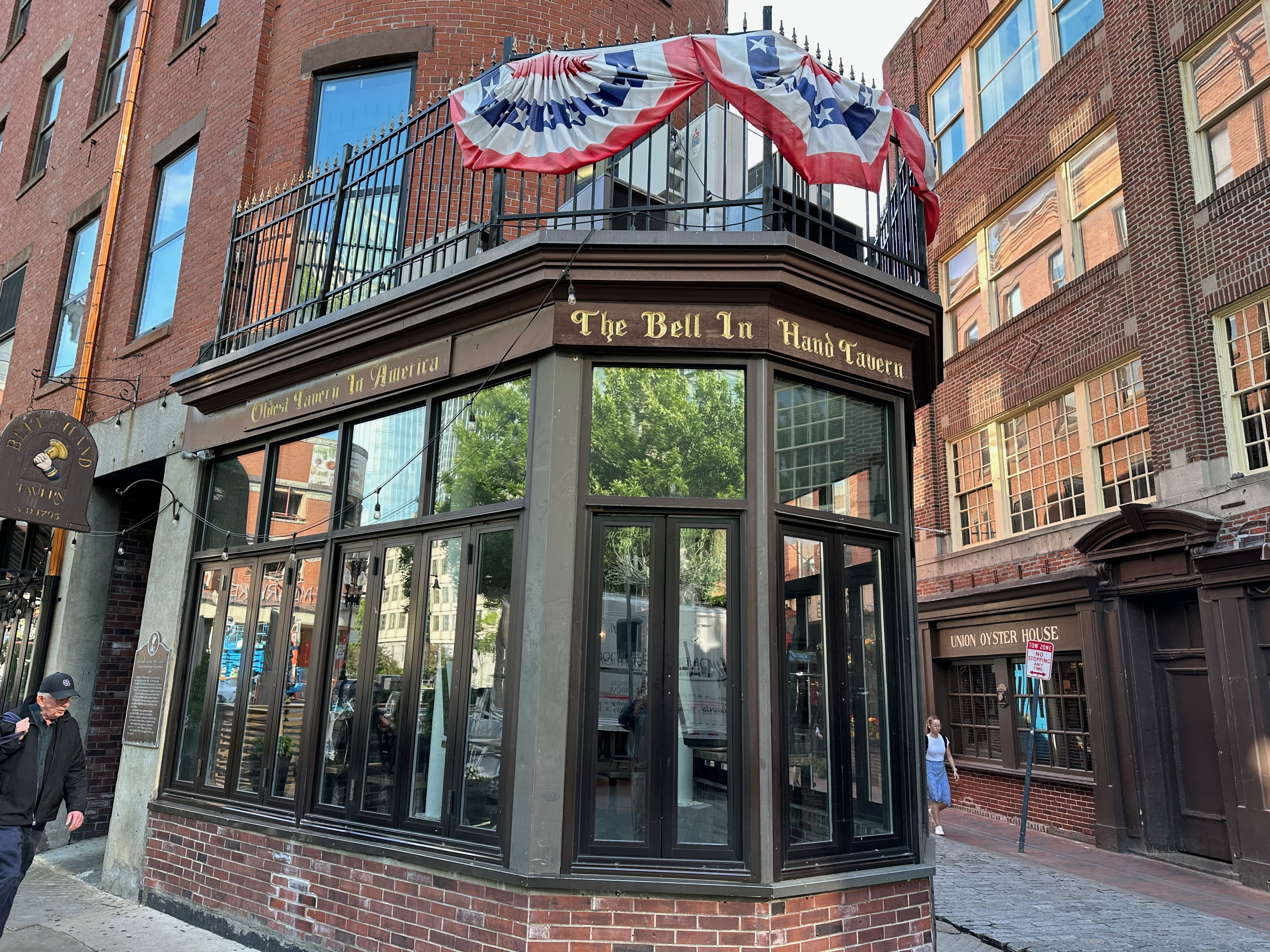
Bell in Hand Tavern (2023)
