= Hanover Street (Boston) =

Street in Boston, Massachusetts

Coordinates: 42°21′50.85″N 71°03′14.14″W

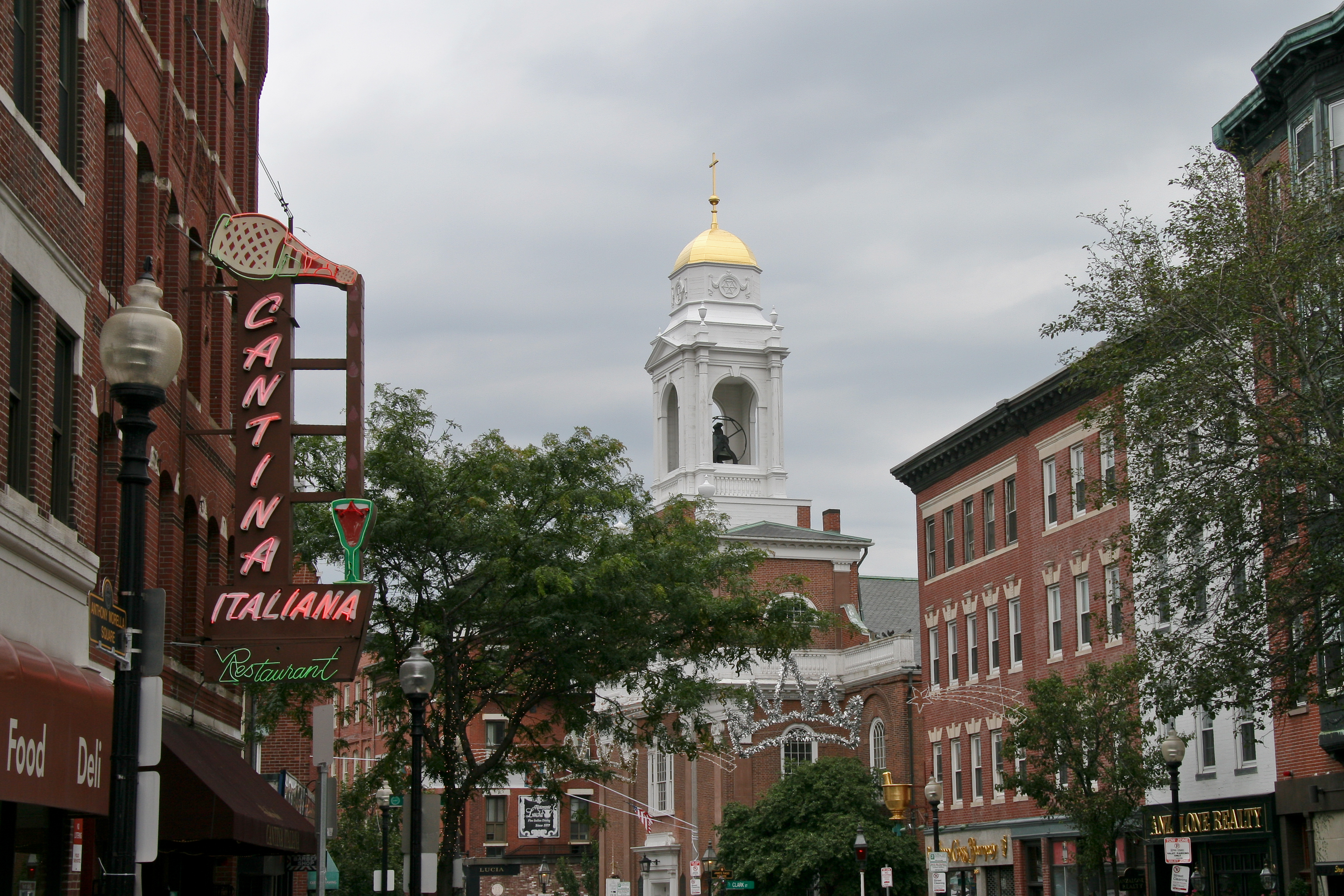
- Hanover Street, Boston, 2009
- Interactive map of Hanover Street
- Location: Boston
- South end: Congress Street
- North end: Commercial Street

Hanover Street is located in the North End of Boston, Massachusetts.

== History ==
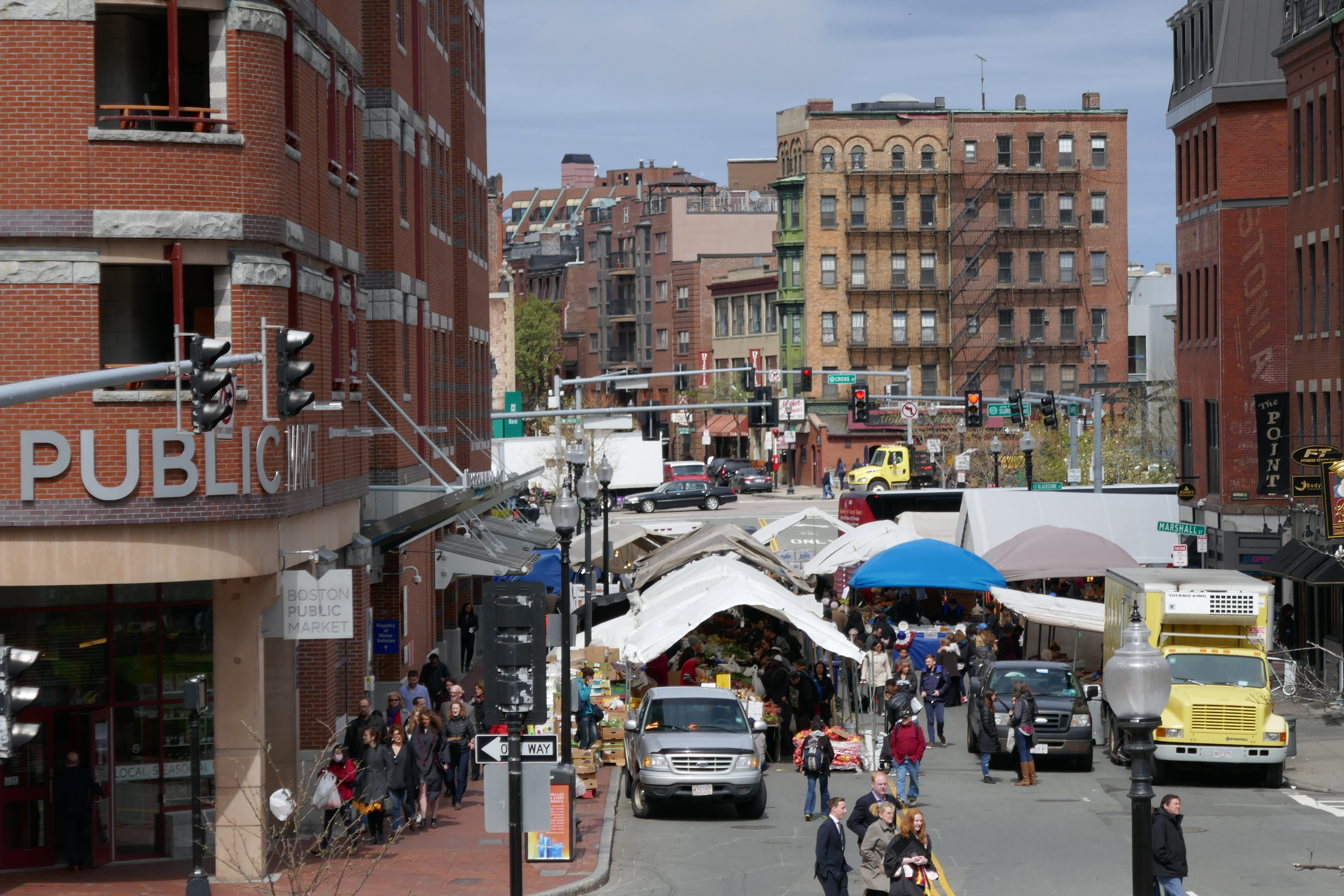
Hanover Street closed to traffic for Haymarket

The street is one of the oldest in Boston, and was originally a Native American path, allowing access to the shore, prior to the first European settlement. In the 17th century, the street was called Orange Tree Lane. In 1708, the street was renamed after the House of Hanover, heirs to the British throne under the Act of Settlement 1701.

In 1824, North Street and the former Middle Street became part of Hanover. In the 1950s, the block of Hanover Street between Cross Street and Blackstone Street was demolished to make way for the construction of the Central Artery. This block was reopened in 2004 when the elevated Central Artery was removed as part of the Big Dig and replaced by the Rose Kennedy Greenway.

In the 1960s the southern section of Hanover street, from Congress Street to Court Street (now Cambridge Street), was demolished to make way for the construction of Government Center. Hanover Street is now home to many businesses, cafes, churches, and Italian restaurants. The portion of the street between the Rose Kennedy Greenway and Union Street is closed on Friday and Saturday each week for the Haymarket open-air market.

== See also ==
- Boston Harborwalk
- St. Stephen's Church, Boston
- Rose Kennedy Greenway
- North End Parks
- Boston Public Market
- Blackstone Block Historic District
- Freedom Trail
- Government Center

Former tenants

- American House (Boston)
- Concert Hall (Boston, Massachusetts)
- Michele Felice Cornè, artist, c. 1810s
- Cotton Mather lived on Hanover St., 1688-1718
- John Mayo
- Second Church, Boston

== Image gallery ==
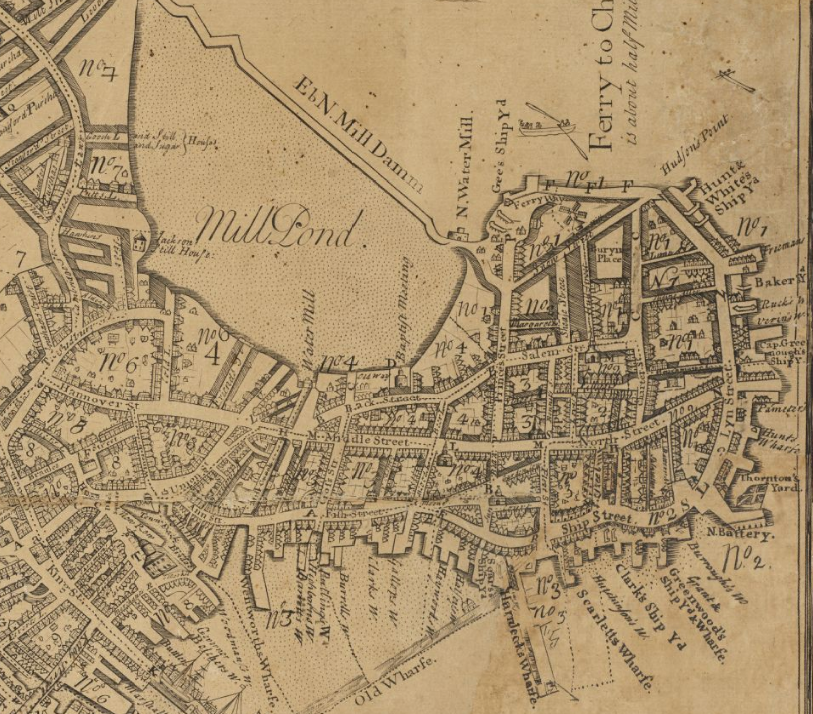
Detail of 1769 map of Boston, showing Hanover St. and North End

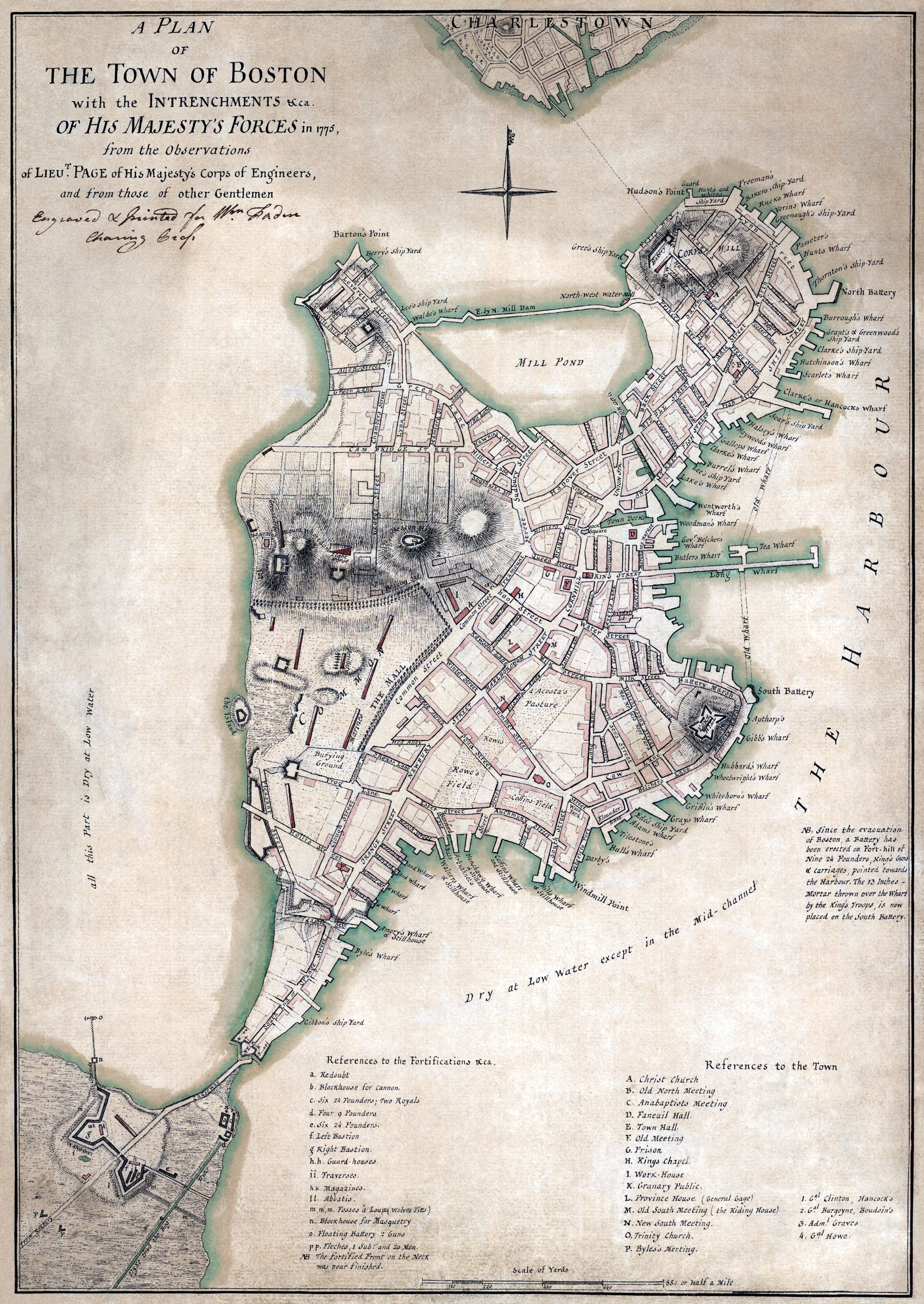
Map showing a British tactical evaluation of Boston in 1775. It shows a street called "Hanover Street" and "Middle Street". Map by Lieut. Thomas Hyde Page

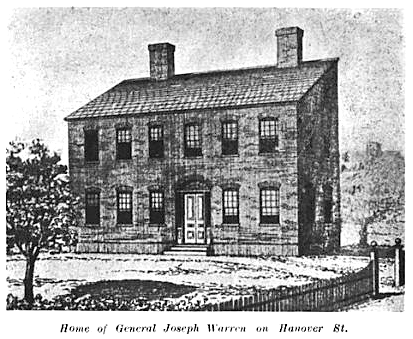
House of General Joseph Warren, Hanover St., 18th century

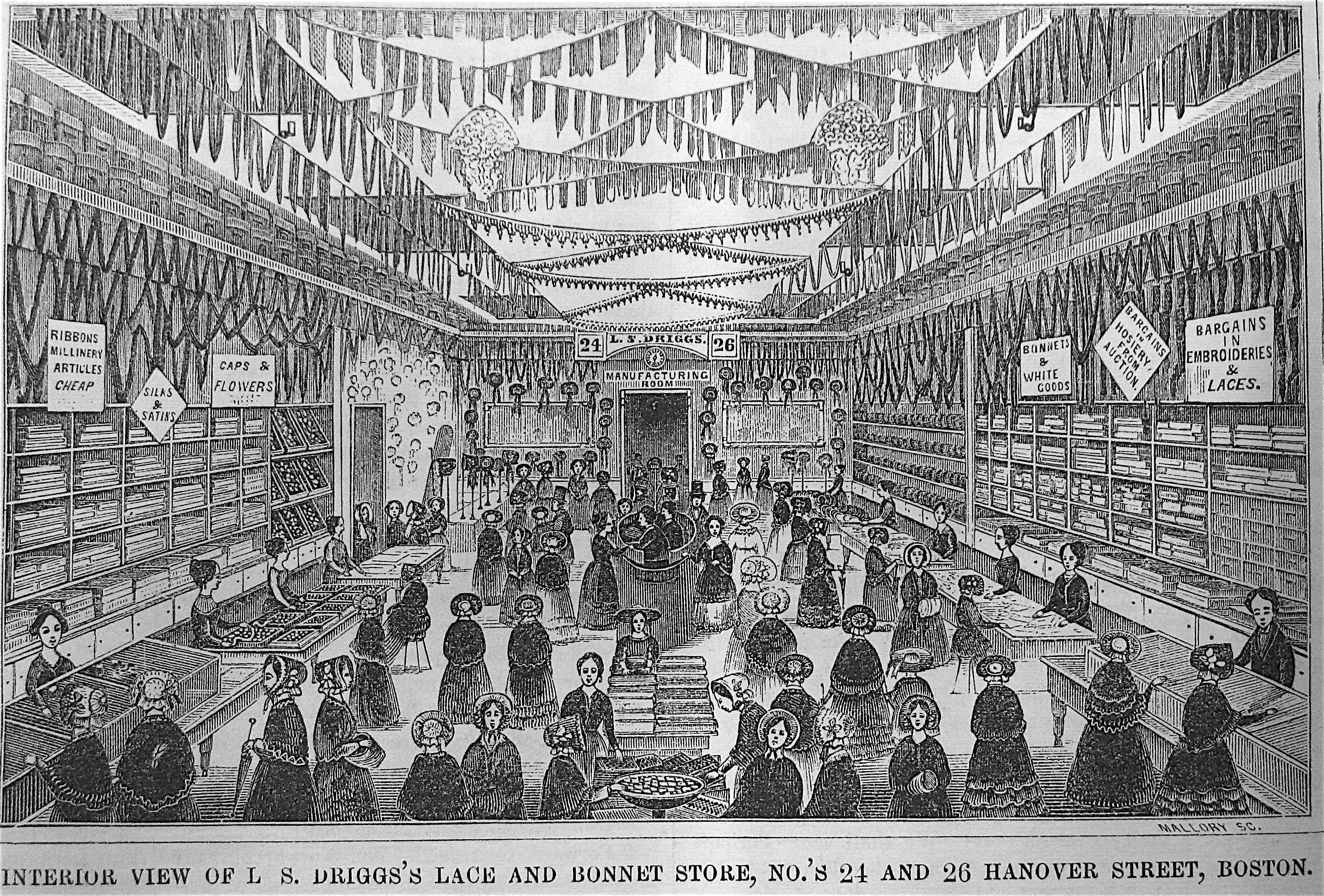
L.S. Drigg's Lace and Bonnet store, Hanover St., 1850s (illustration from Gleason's Pictorial)

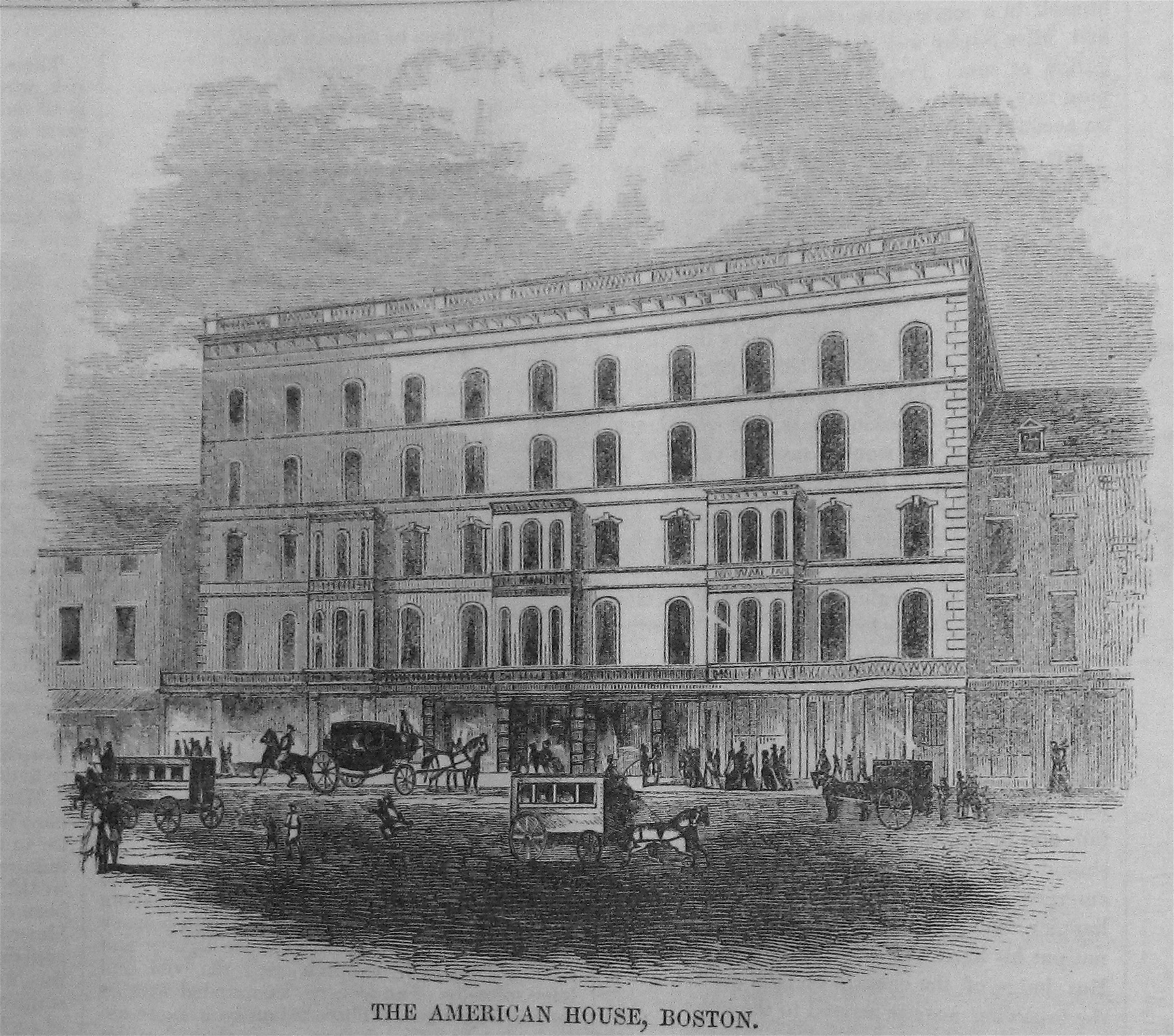
American House, Hanover St., 1850s (illustration from Gleason's Pictorial)

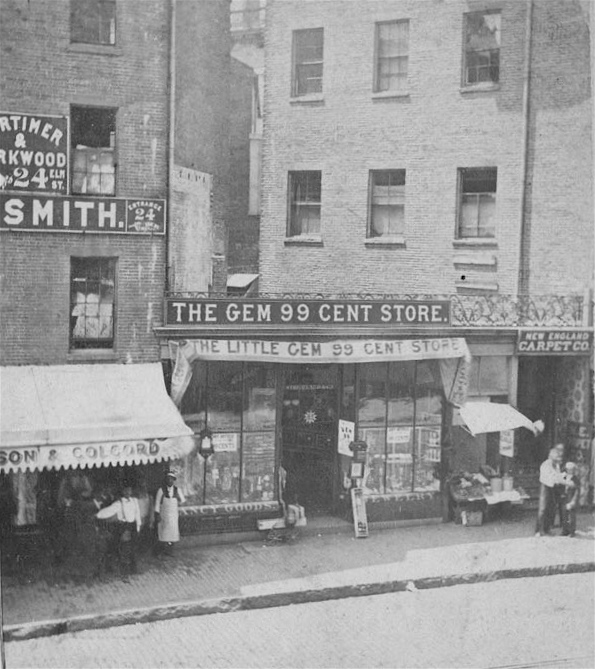
The Gem 99 Cent Store, c. 1860s-1870s

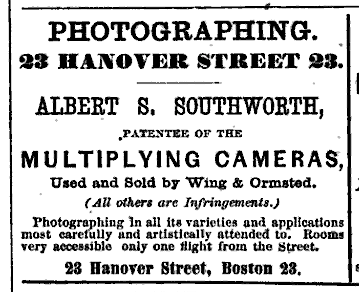
Advertisement for Albert Southworth, photographer, 1868

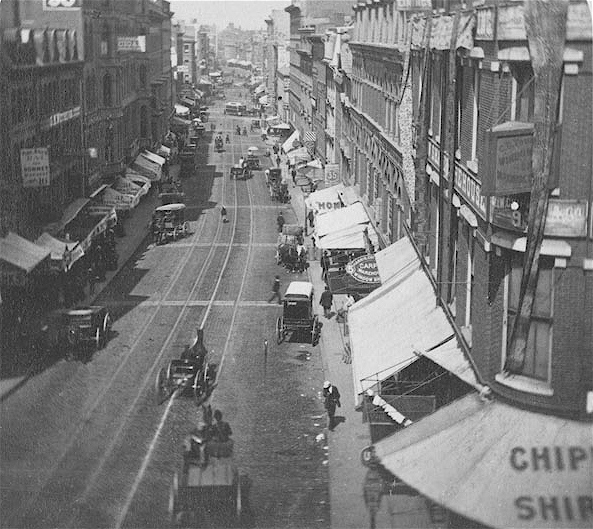
Hanover St., from Court St., 19th century

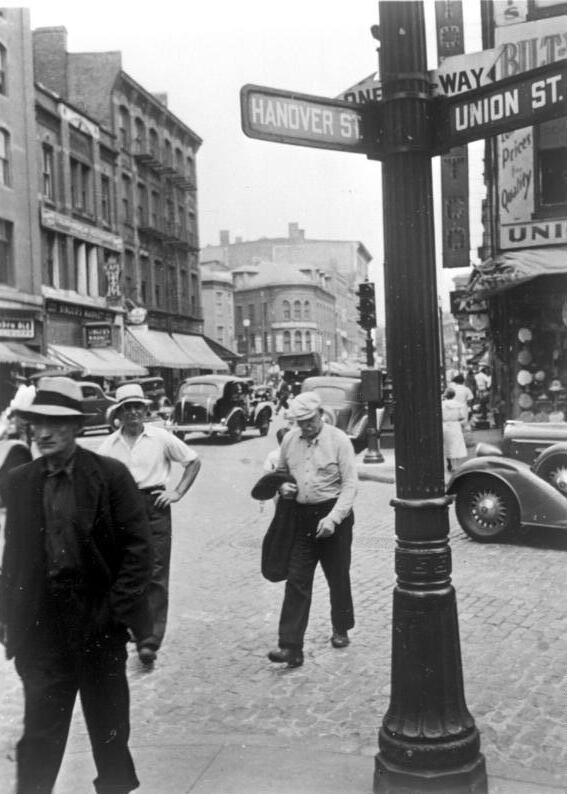
Corner of Hanover and Union Streets, Boston, 1930

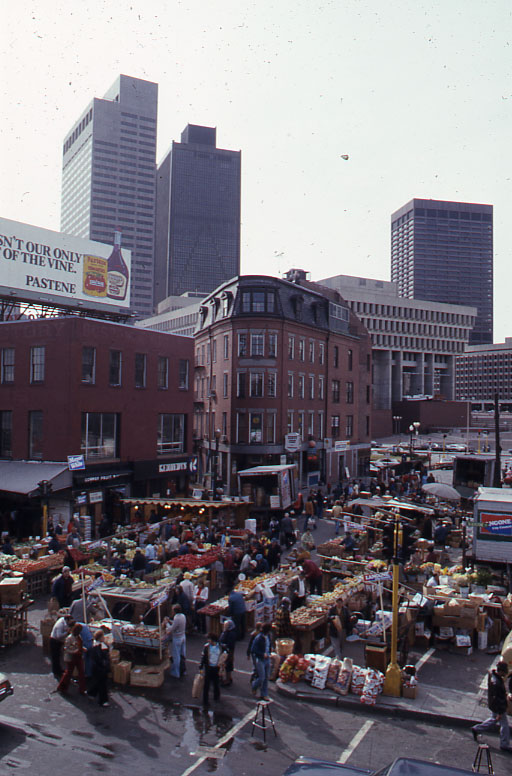
View west on Hanover Street from the Central Artery showing Haymarket, 1975
