= Union Street (Boston) =

Street in Boston, Massachusetts

Coordinates: 42.3614°N 71.0569°W

- Green Dragon Lane (formerly)
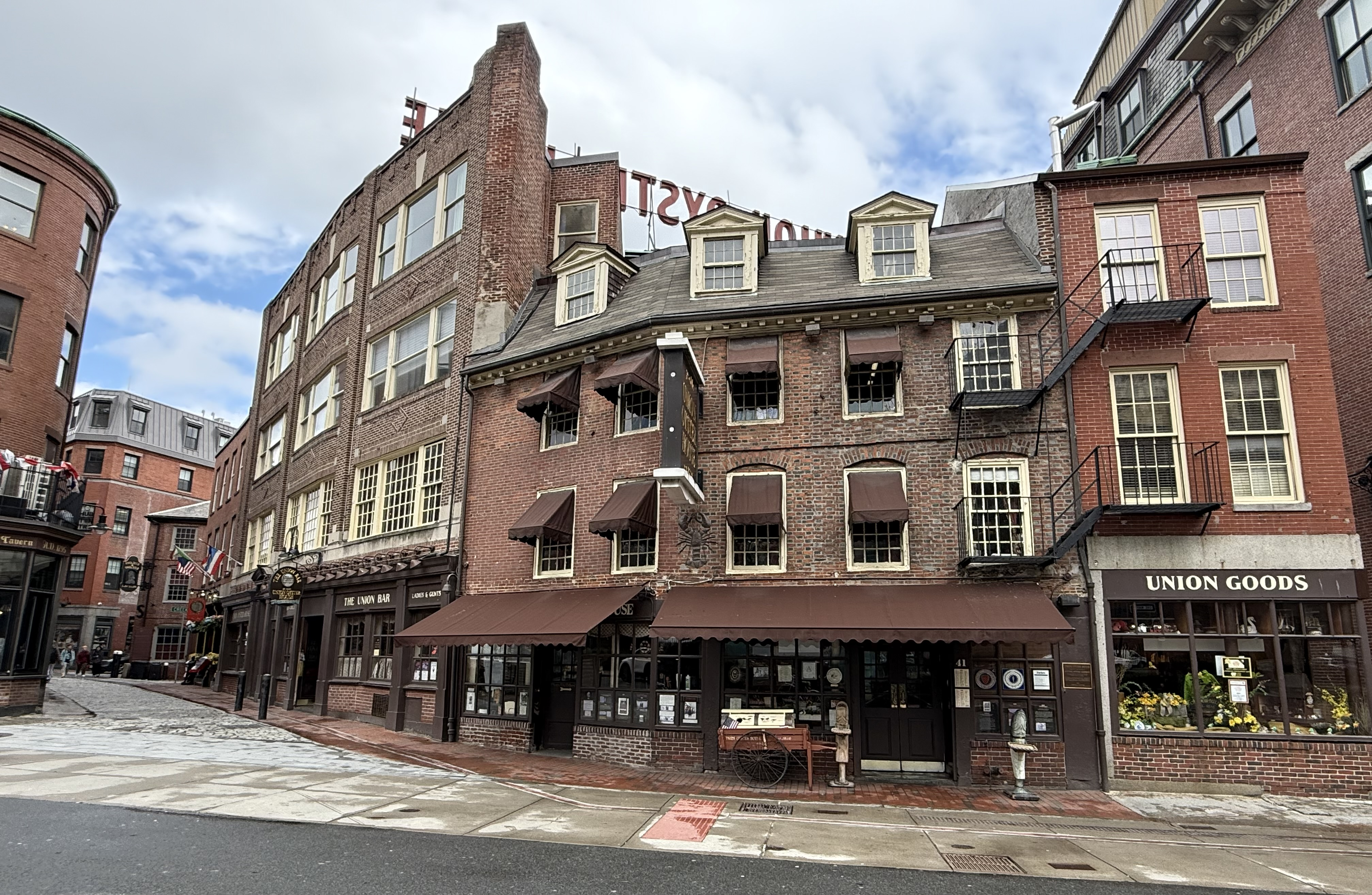
- Union Oyster House
- Interactive map of Union Street
- Part of: Government Center
- Location: Boston, Massachusetts, U.S.

Union Street is a street in Government Center, Boston, Massachusetts, United States. Prior to 1828, it was also called Green Dragon Lane. The street is in the Blackstone Block Historic District.

Union Oyster House stands on Union Street, as does the New England Holocaust Memorial.

== Gallery ==
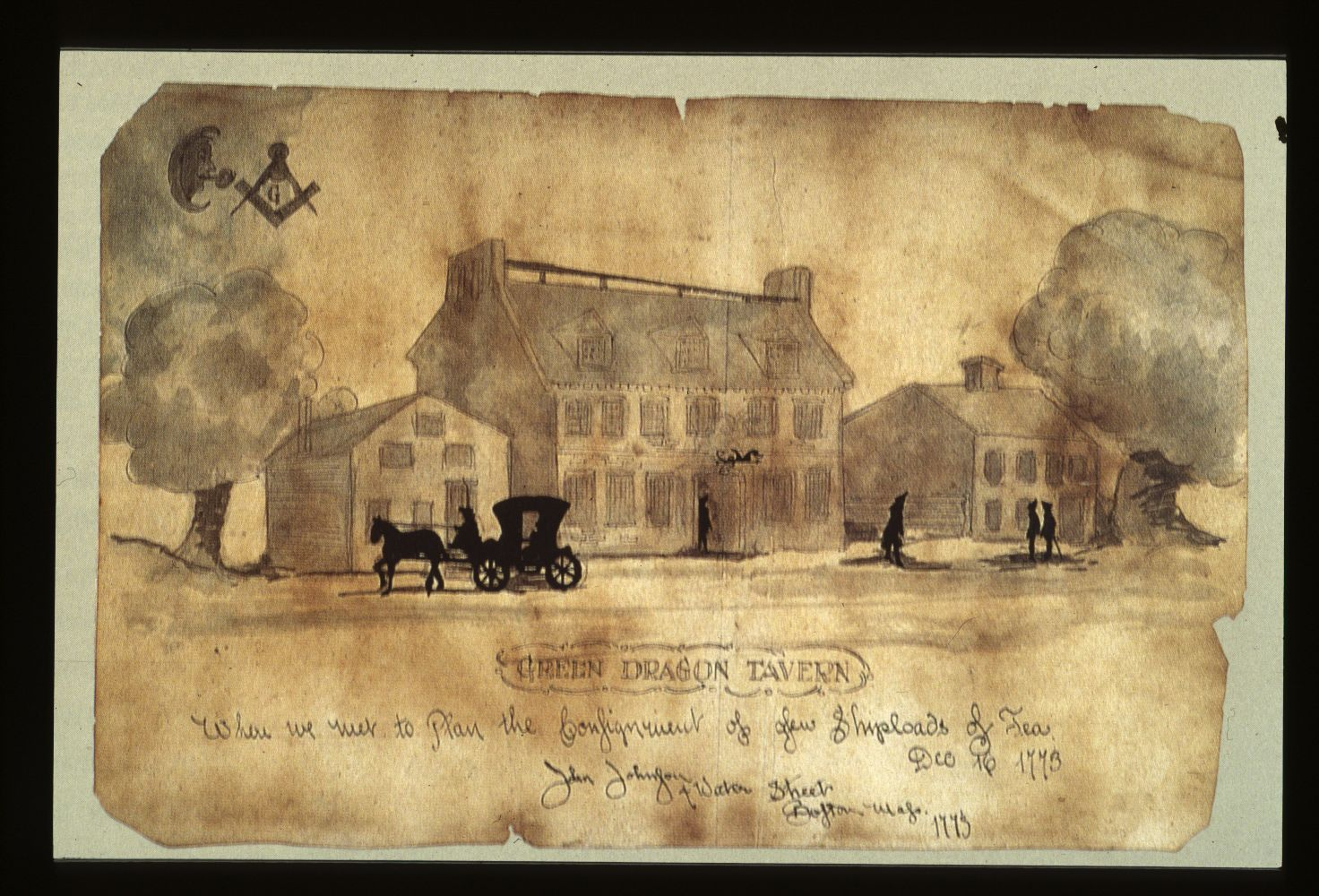
Green Dragon Tavern, watercolor, 1773

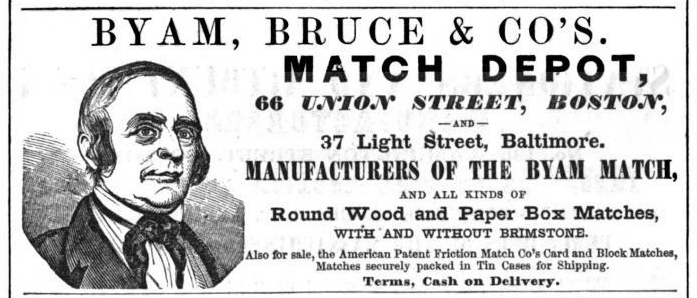
Byam, Bruce & Co's. Match Depot, 1850

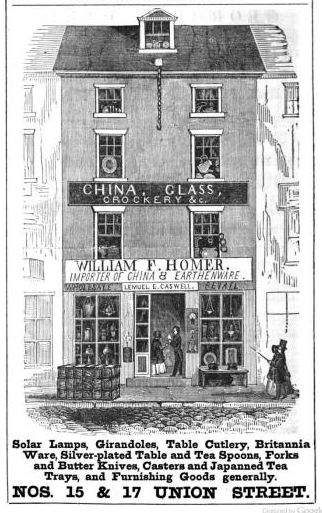
William F. Homer, china, glass, crockery &c., 1852

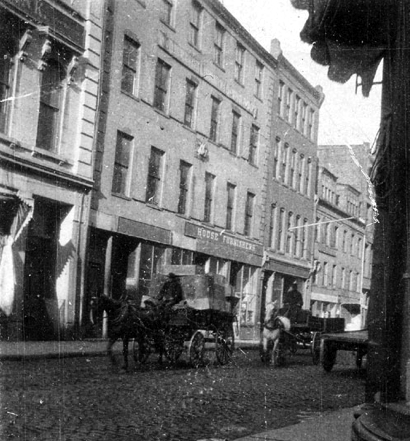
c. 1870s

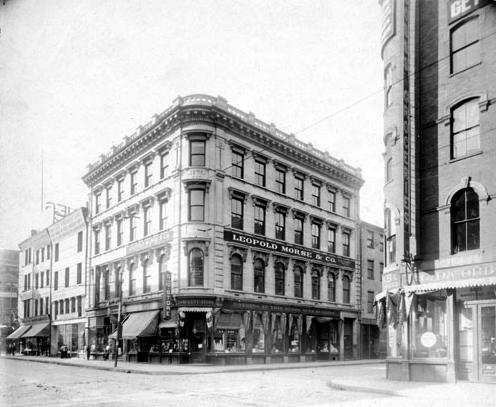
Corner of Union and Hanover Streets, c. 1905

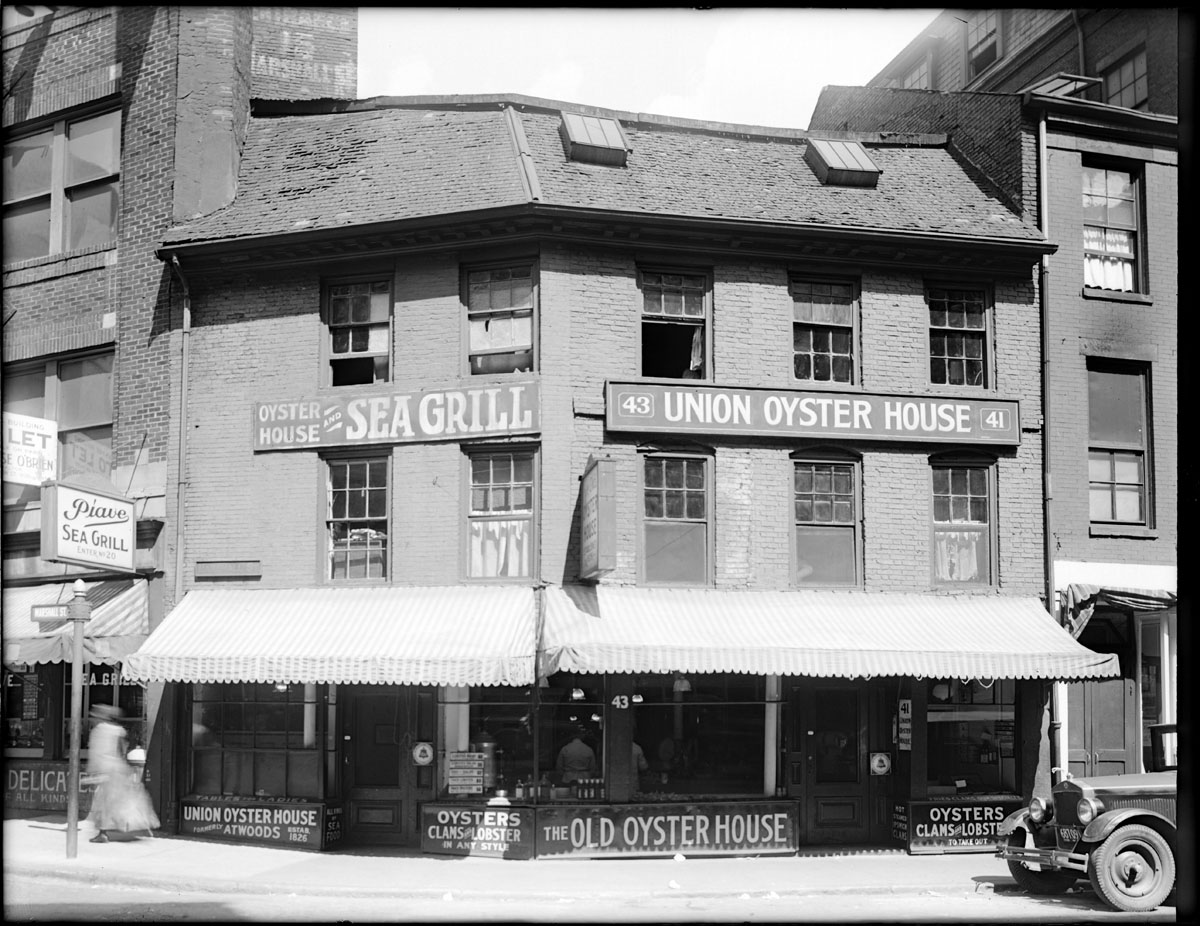
Capen House, 1930

== See also ==
- First Baptist Church
