= Edward Griffin Porter =

American minister and writer (1837–1900)

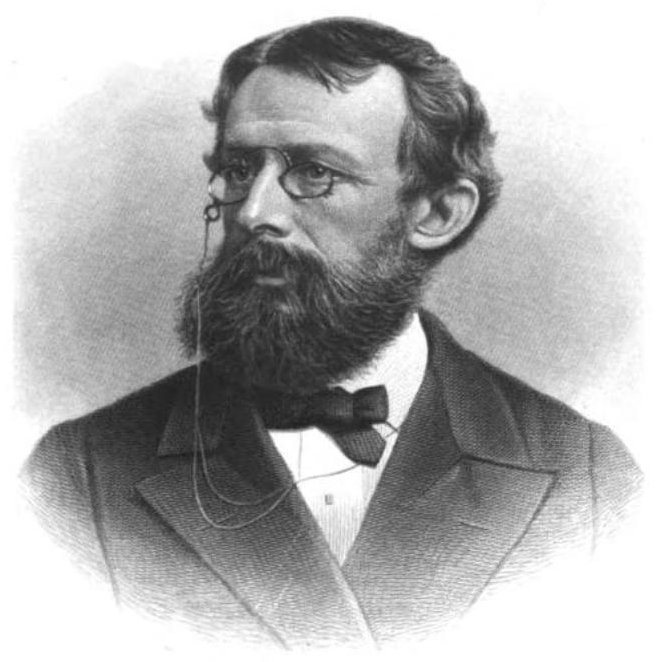
- Porter around 1887
- Born: January 24, 1837; Boston, Massachusetts, U.S.
- Died: February 5, 1900 (aged 63); Dorchester, Massachusetts, U.S.
- Occupations: Minister and writer

Edward Griffin Porter (January 24, 1837 – February 5, 1900) was an American minister and writer. He was known as "an authority on the local history of Boston, and all of New England."

== Early life ==
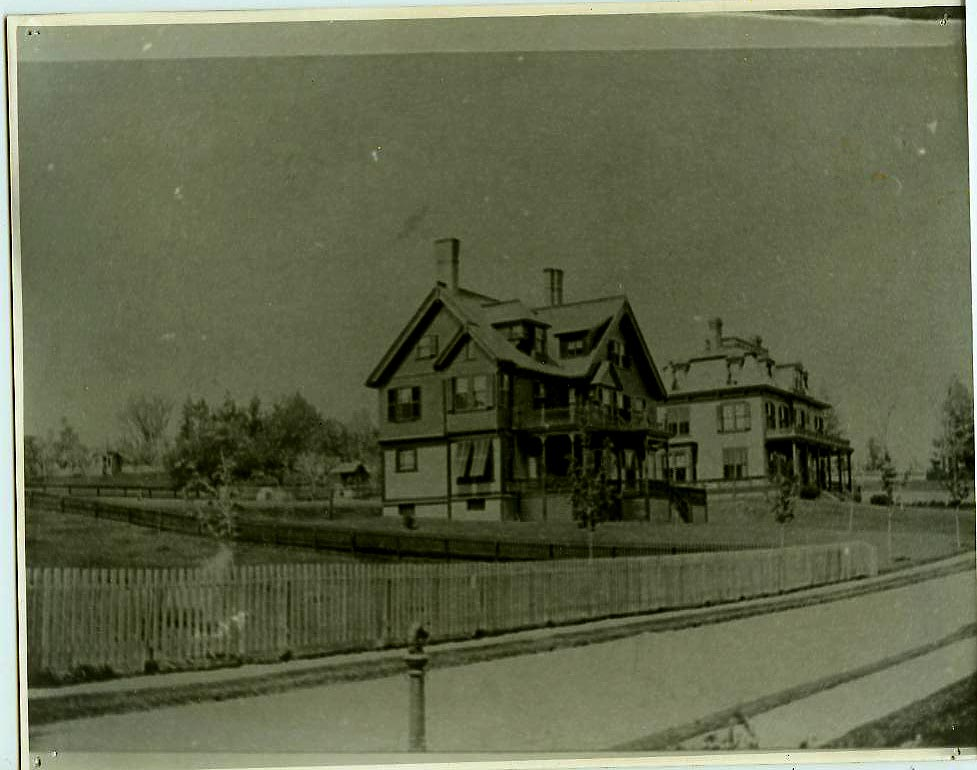
Nathan Carruth's home at 24 Beaumont Street in Dorchester (c. 1879), where Porter grew up

Porter was born in Boston, Massachusetts, in 1837 to Royal Loomis Porter and Sarah Ann Pratt. He was their middle child, between Royal Francis ("Frank") and William Rogers. Porter's father, who was a descendant of the first settler of East Hartford, Connecticut Colony, was editor and proprietor of the Boston Traveller, a newspaper established in 1825.

In 1844, Porter lost his father at the age of 43, shortly after the family had moved from Boston to Canton, Massachusetts. His mother remarried, to Boston merchant Nathan Carruth, in 1845. Porter gained three half-siblings with that marriage: sisters Ellen and Emma and brother Herbert. The family lived on Hancock Street in Dorchester for around three years, before moving to a home Edward's stepfather had built, at today's 24 Beaumont Street, described as "one of the most eligible in the vicinity of Boston."

After attending several schools in the private and public sectors, Porter began at Phillips Academy in Andover in 1851, graduating in the summer of 1854. He then attended Williams College briefly but transferred to Harvard College, where most of his friends had gone, graduating in 1858.

== Career ==
Porter gained his license to preach from the Norfolk Association in Braintree, Massachusetts, in 1864. That spring, during the Civil War, he served with the United States Sanitary Commission, during which he contracted a fever which impaired his health. He returned to Dorchester to take charge at the Second Church during the absences of its pastor.

In 1887, Porter wrote his seminal work, Rambles in Old Boston, New England, with illustrations provided by George R. Tolman. It was published by Cupples, Upham and Company. In the April 30 edition of The Literary World, it was described as "a stately quarto got up with a high degree of mechanical excellence, and in every respect deserves earnest praise."

== Publications ==
Porter wrote or contributed to the following publications:

- Historical Sketch of the Battle of Lexington (1875)
- Rambles in Old Boston, New England (1887)
- Memorial History of Boston (contributor; 1880)

He also published several papers.

== Personal life ==
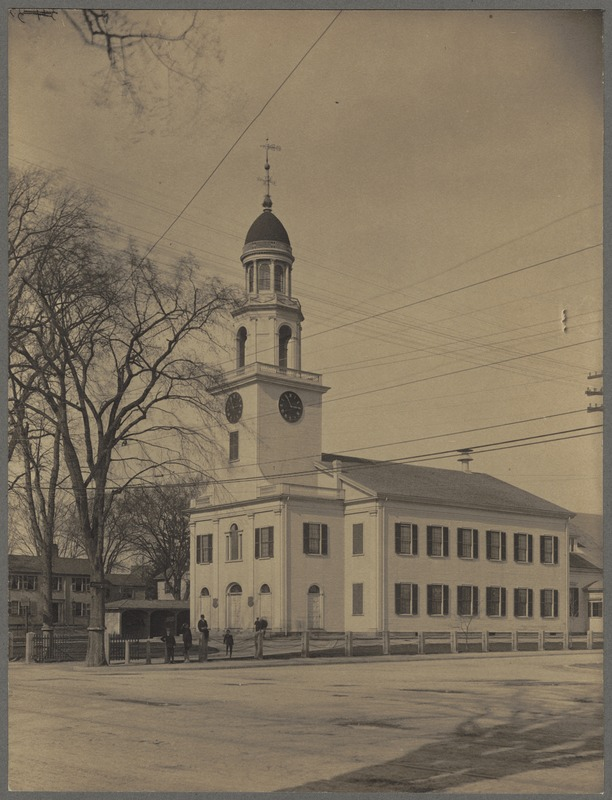
Second Church of Dorchester

In 1853, having turned 16, Porter joined the Second Church of Dorchester, which was then under the ministry of Reverend James H. Means. In 1858, after graduating Harvard College, he sailed around Europe, for what was initially supposed to be six months, with his mother; he did not return to America until July 1861, however, after which he attained a degree in Master of Arts from Andover Theological Seminary. He traveled again in 1866―to England, Switzerland, Italy, Malta and Greece―and to Turkey, India, China and Japan in 1887 and 1888.

In 1868, Porter was ordained minister of Hancock Congregational Church in Lexington, Massachusetts, a role in which he remained for 23 years. Upon retirement, he was made Pastor Emeritus and remained a resident of Lexington.

Porter was elected a member of the American Antiquarian Society in 1876 and, four years later, a member of the Massachusetts Historical Society. He was also a member of the Colonial Society of Massachusetts, which was established in 1892, and of the American Historical Association.

In the last few years of his life, Porter was researching the path which, in colonial times, led from Boston, through Worcester, to Springfield.

In his final year, he was elected president of the New England Historic Genealogical Society and was elected to fellowship in the Harvard chapter of the Phi Beta Kappa fraternity.

== Death ==
Porter died in 1900, aged 63, at the Ashmont home of his mother. He was interred in Dorchester's Cedar Grove Cemetery, alongside his mother and all five of his siblings. (His father was buried beside Edward's grandfather in Westlawn Cemetery in Williamstown, Massachusetts.)

Samuel Swett Green, president of the American Library Association, wrote a memoir of Porter in 1900.
