= Rambles in Old Boston, New England =

Work by Edwin Griffin Porter

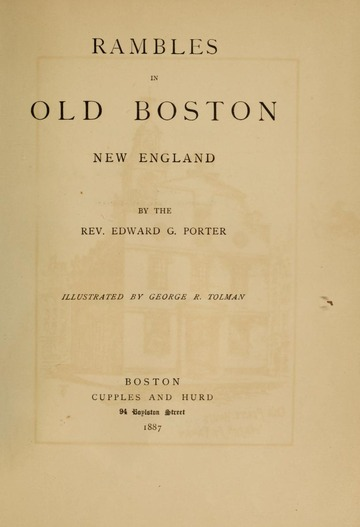
- The book's title page
- Author: Edward Griffin Porter
- Language: English
- Genre: History
- Publisher: Cupples, Upham and Company
- Publication date: 1887 (139 years ago)
- Publication place: United States
- Media type: Hardback book
- Pages: 403

Rambles in Old Boston, New England is a book by Edward Griffin Porter, published in 1887 by Cupples, Upham and Company. It mostly documents the architecture of Boston, Massachusetts, in the late 19th century.

Almost 100 illustrations, provided by George R. Tolman, were undertaken from the elements themselves, not from engravings or publications. As Porter wrote in his foreword: "With the single exception of the old feather-store in Dock Square, which was drawn from an original pencil sketch by Bartholomew, he has not attempted to represent in detail any building which is not now standing." Porter wrote the foreword from his home in Lexington, Massachusetts, in November 1886.

== Contents ==
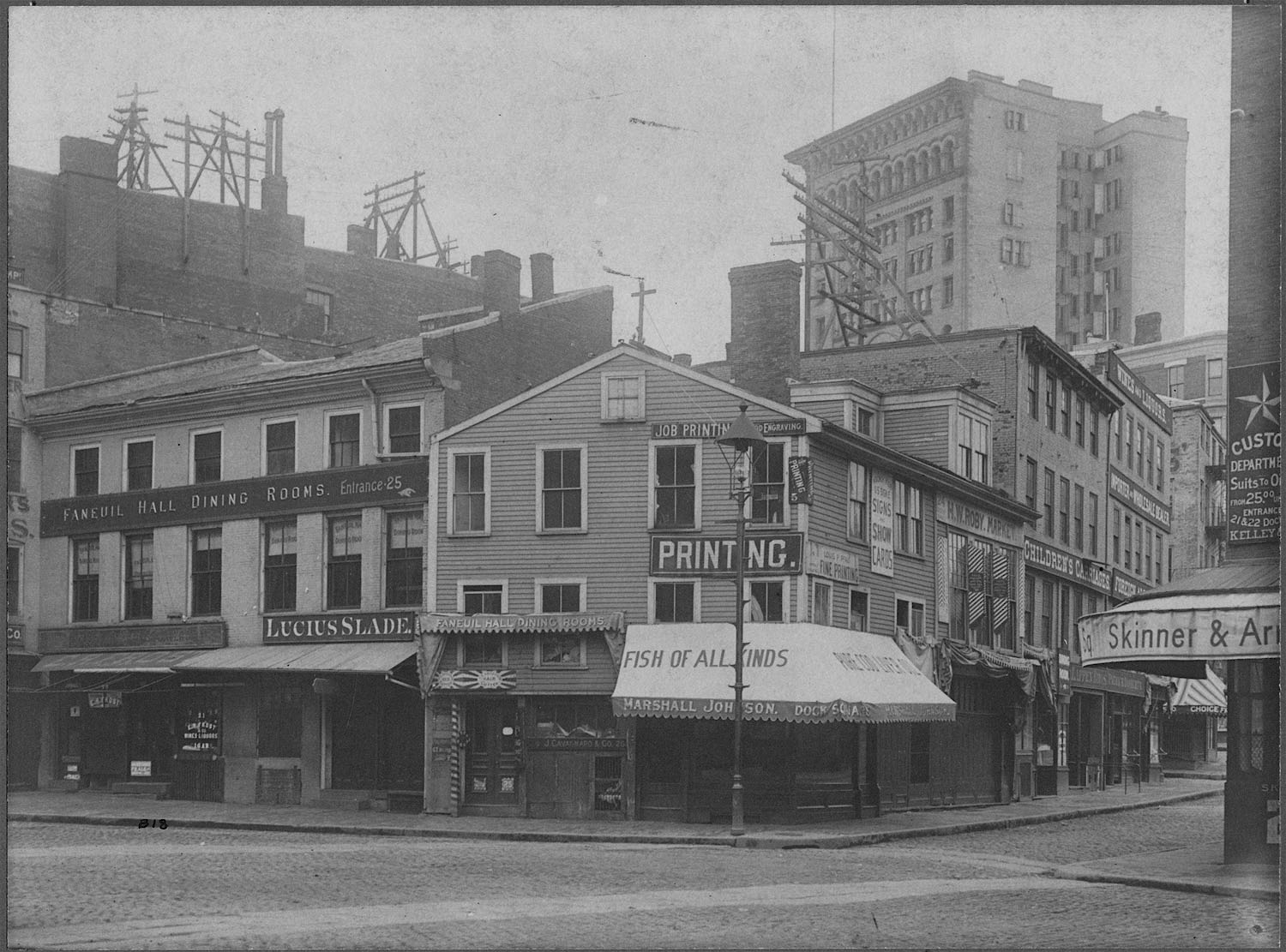
Sun Tavern, Dock Square, 19th century

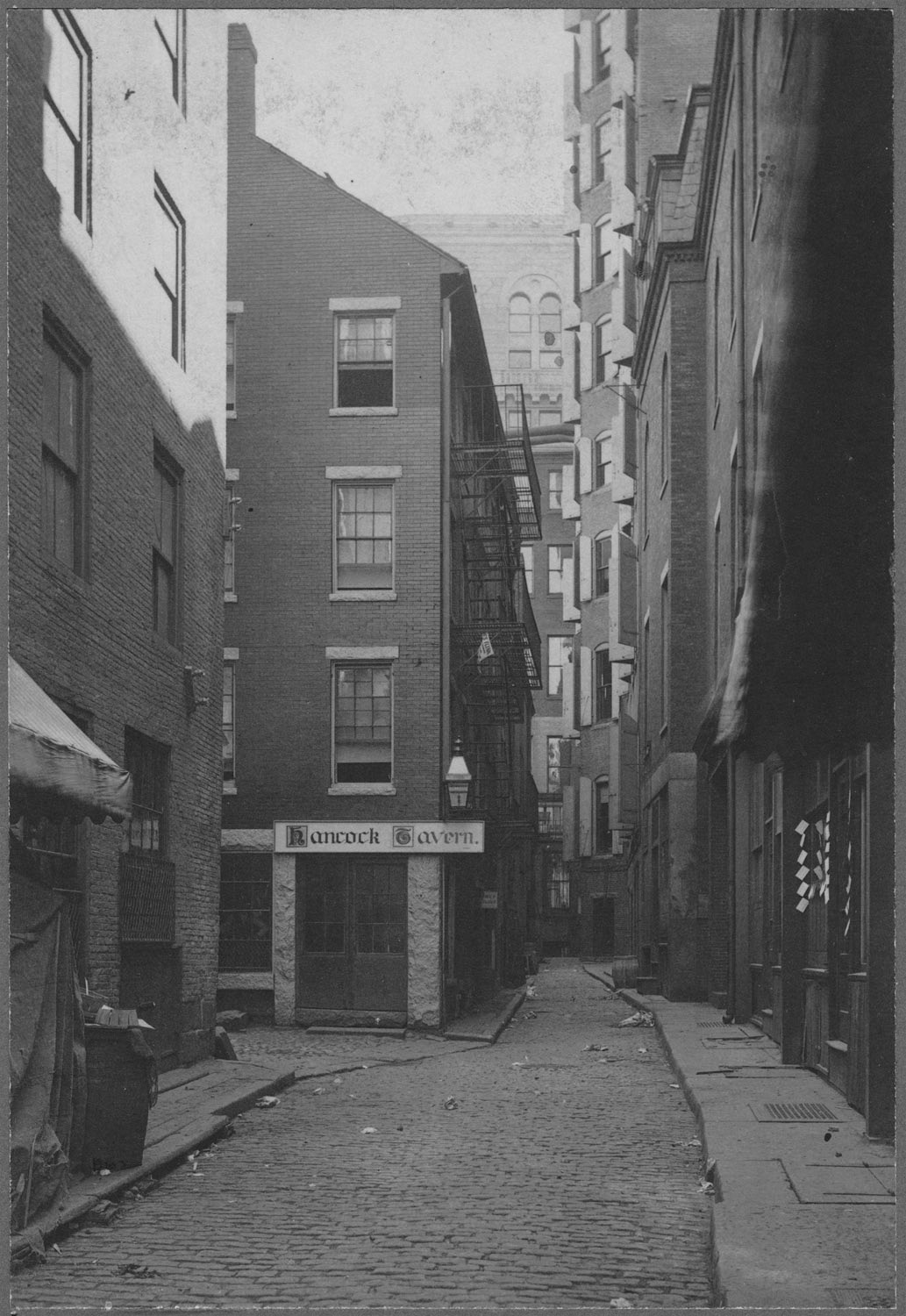
Hancock Tavern, Corn Court, c. 1898

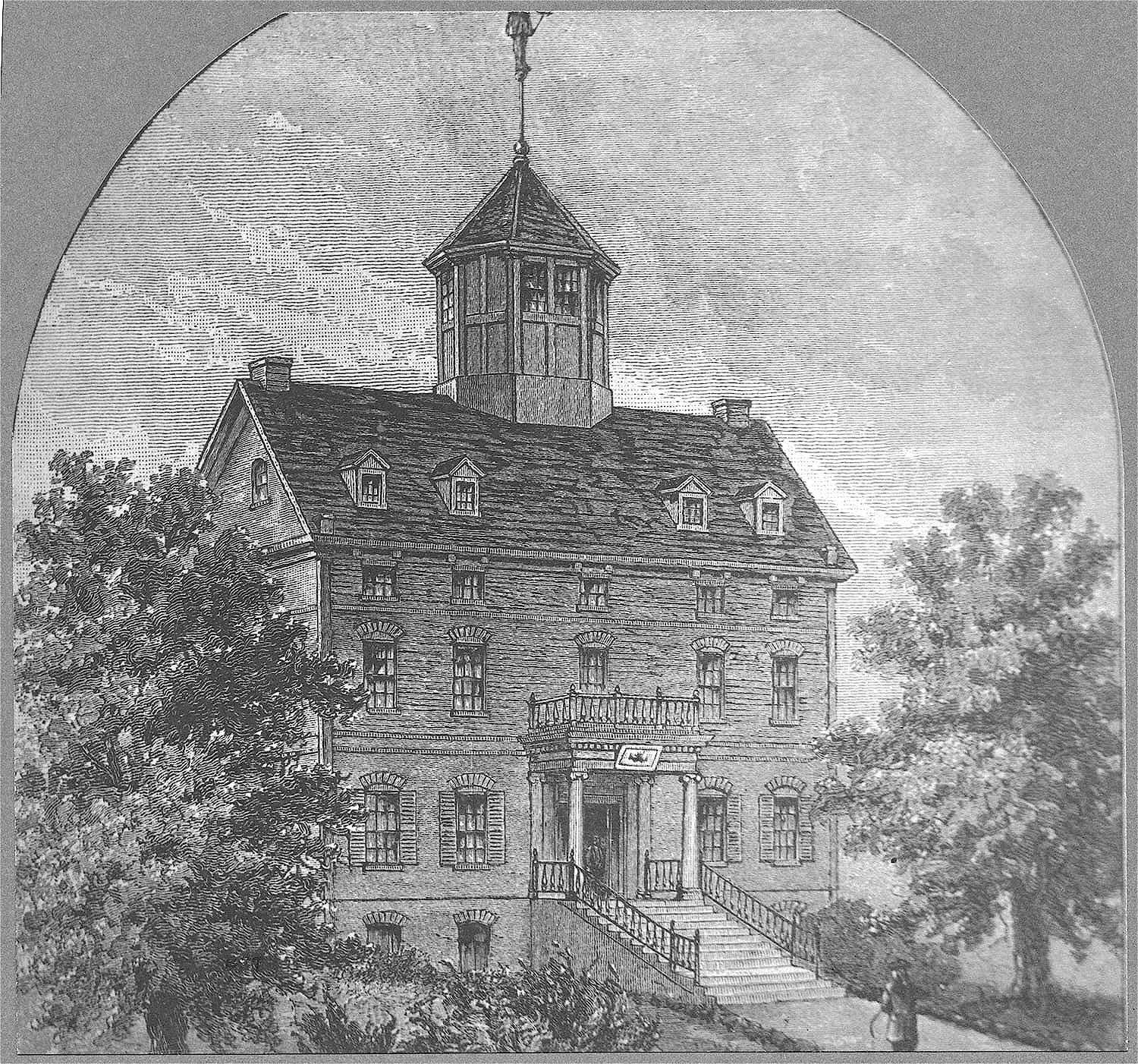
The Province House

- The Old State House
- Paine–Tremere House
- Old Ruin (now demolished)
- Marshall's Lane
- The Boston Stone
- The Painters' Arms (now demolished)
- A Nameless Place (242 Hanover Street; now demolished)
- Faneuil Hall
- Admiral Vernon (southeast corner of State and Merchants Row)
- Corn Court
- The Sun Tavern
- The Old Feather Store
- "Honestus" (a page on Benjamin Austin Jr., a political writer)
- The Green Dragon
- Wells–Adams House (now demolished)
- Badger House (now demolished)
- A British Hospital (now demolished)
- A Prince-Street House (where Major John Pitcairn died in 1775)
- Master Tileston's House (now demolished)
- Newman House (now demolished)
- Sheafe Street
- Colonel Snelling
- Christ Church
- Galloupe House (now demolished)
- Hartt House (now demolished)
- Copp's Hill
- Captain Robert Gray
- North Bennet Street
- Mather–Eliot House (now demolished)
- Noah Lincoln's House (now demolished)
- Unity Street
- Tileston Street
- Charter Street
- Vernon Place (now demolished)
- Foster Street
- An Ancient Tunnel
- Salem Street
- Salutation Alley
- Fleet Street
- Odds and Ends
  - The Ship Tavern
  - The North-End Coffee House
  - A North-End Family (McKeans)
  - The New North Church (the predecessor to St. Stephen's Church)
  - Clark Street
  - Chimney Sweeps
- North Square
- The Old North Church
- Paul Revere's House
- A Noted Bell
- An Ancient Weathercock
- The Wadsworth Tablet (a sign for the now-demolished Red Lion Pub, which stood at the northeast corner of North Street and Richmond Street, an intersection also no longer in existence)
- Ochterlony–Adan House (now demolished)
- Eastern Stage House (now demolished)
- Bell in Hand
- King's Chapel
- King's Chapel Burial-Ground
- The Province House
- The Old Corner Bookstore
- The Old South
- The Sheaffe House (now demolished)

== Reception ==
In the April 30, 1887, edition of The Literary World, it was described as "a stately quarto got up with a high degree of mechanical excellence, and in every respect deserves earnest praise."
