= Governor of Massachusetts =

Head of government of Massachusetts

Governor of the Commonwealth of Massachusetts
- Seal of the governor

- Standard of the governor

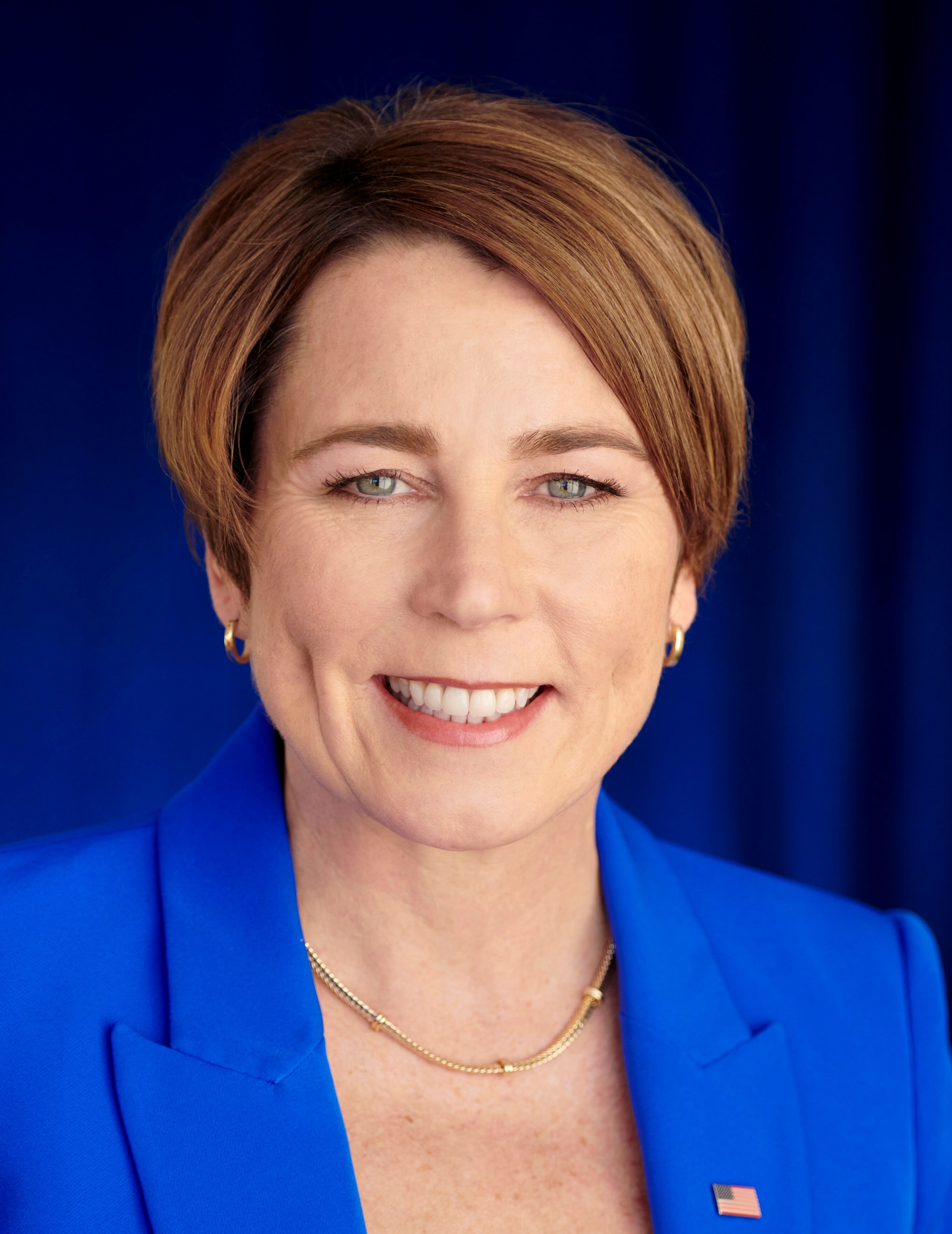
- Incumbent; Maura Healey since January 5, 2023
- Government of Massachusetts
- Style: Governor (informal); Her Excellency (formal)
- Status: Head of state Head of government
- Member of: Governor's Council; Cabinet
- Residence: None official
- Seat: State House, Boston, Massachusetts
- Nominator: Nominating petition, Political parties
- Appointer: Popular vote
- Term length: Four years, no term limits
- Constituting instrument: Constitution of Massachusetts
- Formation: Original post: April 30, 1629; Current form: October 25, 1780
- First holder: John Endecott
- Succession: Line of succession
- Deputy: Lieutenant Governor of Massachusetts
- Salary: $185,000 (2022)
- Website: Official website

The governor of the Commonwealth of Massachusetts is the head of government of the Commonwealth of Massachusetts. The governor is the head of the state cabinet and the commander-in-chief of the commonwealth's military forces.

Massachusetts has a republican system of government that is akin to a presidential system. The governor acts as the head of government while having a distinct role from that of the legislative branch. The governor has far-reaching political obligations, including ceremonial and political duties. The governor also signs bills into law and has veto power. The governor is a member of the Massachusetts Governor's Council, a popularly elected council with eight members who provide advice and consent on certain legal matters and appointments.

Beginning with the Massachusetts Bay Company in 1629, the role of the governor has changed throughout its history in terms of powers and selection. The modern form of the position was created in the 1780 Constitution of Massachusetts, which called for the position of a "supreme executive magistrate".

Governors of Massachusetts are elected every four years during state elections that are held on the first Tuesday of November after November 1. The most recent Massachusetts gubernatorial election was held in 2026. Following each gubernatorial election, the elected governor is inaugurated on the Thursday after the first Wednesday in January following the election. There are no term limits restricting how long a governor may serve. The longest-serving Massachusetts governor is Michael Dukakis, who served 12 years; Dukakis was in office from 1975 to 1979 and from 1983 to 1991. The current governor is Maura Healey, a Democrat.

== Qualifications ==
Any person seeking to become governor of Massachusetts must meet the following requirements:

- Be at least eighteen years of age
- Be a registered voter in Massachusetts
- Be a Massachusetts resident for at least seven years when elected
- Receive 10,000 signatures from registered voters on nomination papers

== Election and term ==
The governor is an elected position. The term of office is four years since the 82nd amendment to the Massachusetts Constitution in 1964, with no term limit.

Elections for governor are held on a four-year basis concurrently with elections for the offices of lieutenant governor, attorney general, secretary of the commonwealth, state treasurer, and state auditor.

== History ==
The role of governor has existed in Massachusetts since the Royal Charter of 1628. The original role was one of a president of the board of a joint-stock company, namely the Massachusetts Bay Company. The governor would be elected by freemen, who were shareholders of the company. These shareholders were mostly colonists themselves who fit certain religious requirements. The governor acted in a vice-regal manner, overseeing the governance and functioning of the colony. Originally they were supposed to reside in London, as was the case with other colonial company governors, although this protocol was broken when John Winthrop was appointed governor. The governor served as the executive of the colony, originally elected annually, and were joined by a Council of Assistants. This council was a group of magistrates who performed judicial functions, acted as an upper house of the General Court, and provided advice and consent to the governor. The early governors of Massachusetts Bay were staunchly Puritan colonists who wished to form a state that coincided with religious law.

With the founding of the Dominion of New England by James II of England, the New England colonies were combined with the Province of New York, Province of West Jersey, and the Province of East Jersey. During this period (1686–1689) Massachusetts had no governor of its own. Instead there existed a royally appointed governor who resided in Boston and served at the King's pleasure. Though there existed a council which served as a quasi-legislature, however the logistics of calling the council to meet were so arduous that the Dominion was essentially governed by the Crown through the royal governor. The reason for the creation of such a post was there existed tremendous hostility between the Kingdom of England and the colonists of Massachusetts Bay. In an effort to bring the colonies under tighter control the Crown dismantled the old assembly system and created the Viceroy system based on the Spanish model in New Spain. This model of government was greatly disliked by the colonists all throughout British North America but especially in New England where colonists at one time did have some semblance of democratic and local control. With the Glorious Revolution and the Boston Revolt the Dominion was abolished in 1689.

With the creation of the Massachusetts Charter in 1691, the role of civilian governor was restored in Massachusetts Bay. Now the Province of Massachusetts Bay, the colony then encompassed the territory of the Massachusetts Bay Colony, the Plymouth Colony, and areas of what is now the state of Maine. The governor however would not be chosen by the electorate, instead the position would remain a royal appointment. In order to ease tensions with royal authorities and the colonists the General Court was reestablished and given significant powers. This created acrimony between the governors and the assembly of the General Court. The governor could veto any decision made by the assembly and had control over the militia, however the General Court had authority of the treasury and provincial finances. This meant that in the event the governor did not agree with or consent with the rulings and laws of the General Court then the assembly would threaten to withhold any pay for the governor and other Royal Officers.

From 1765 on the unraveling of the Province into a full political crisis only increased the tensions between the governor and the people of Massachusetts Bay. Following the passage of the Stamp Act Governor Thomas Hutchinson had his home broken into and ransacked. The early stages of the American Revolution saw political turmoil in Massachusetts Bay. With the passage of the Intolerable Acts the then Royal Governor Thomas Gage dissolved the General Court and began to govern the province by decree. In 1774 the Massachusetts Provincial Congress was formed as an alternative revolutionary government to the royal government in Boston. With Massachusetts Bay declaring its independence in May 1776 the role of governor was vacant for four years. The executive role during this time was filled by the Governor's Council, the Committee of Safety, and the president of the Congress when in session.

With the adoption of the Constitution of Massachusetts in 1780 the role of an elected civilian governor was restored. John Hancock was elected as the first governor of the independent commonwealth on October 25, 1780.

== Constitutional role ==
Part the Second, Chapter II, Section I, Article I of the Massachusetts Constitution reads,

There shall be a supreme executive magistrate, who shall be styled, The Governor of the Commonwealth of Massachusetts; and whose title shall be – His Excellency.

The governor of Massachusetts is the chief executive of the commonwealth, and is supported by a number of subordinate officers. He, like most other state officers, senators, and representatives, was originally elected annually. In 1918 this was changed to a two-year term, and since 1966 the office of governor has carried a four-year term. The governor of Massachusetts does not receive a mansion or other official residence and resides in their own private residence. However, the governor does receive a housing allowance/stipend for $65,000. The title "His Excellency" is a holdover from the royally appointed governors of the Province of Massachusetts Bay. The first governor to use the title was Richard Coote, 1st Earl of Bellomont, in 1699; since he was an Earl, it was thought proper to call him "Your Excellency." The title was retained until 1742, when an order from King George II forbade its further use. However, the framers of the state constitution revived it because they found it fitting to dignify the governor with this title.

The governor also serves as commander-in-chief of the commonwealth's armed forces.

== Succession ==
According to the Massachusetts State Constitution:

Whenever the chair of the governor shall be vacant, by reason of his death, or absence from the commonwealth, or otherwise, the lieutenant governor, for the time being, shall, during such vacancy, perform all the duties incumbent upon the governor, and shall have and exercise all the powers and authorities, which by this constitution the governor is vested with, when personally present.

The Constitution does not use the term "acting governor", but the practice in Massachusetts has been that the lieutenant governor retains the position and title as "lieutenant governor" and becomes acting governor, not governor. The lieutenant governor, when acting as governor, is referred to as "the lieutenant-governor, acting governor" in official documents.

Despite this terminology, the Massachusetts courts have found that the full authority of the office of the governor devolves to the lieutenant governor upon vacancy in the office of governor, and that there is no circumstance short of death, resignation, or impeachment that would relieve the acting governor from the full gubernatorial responsibilities.

The first use of the succession provision occurred in 1785, five years after the constitution's adoption, when Governor John Hancock resigned the post, leaving Lieutenant Governor Thomas Cushing as acting governor. Most recently, Jane Swift became acting governor upon the resignation of Paul Cellucci.

When the constitution was first adopted, the Governor's Council was charged with acting as governor in the event that both the governorship and lieutenant governorship were vacant. This occurred in 1799 when Governor Increase Sumner died in office on June 7, 1799, leaving Lieutenant Governor Moses Gill as acting governor. Acting Governor Gill never received a lieutenant and died on May 20, 1800, between that year's election and the inauguration of Governor-elect Caleb Strong. The Governor's Council served as the executive for ten days; the council's chair, Thomas Dawes was at no point named governor or acting governor.

Article LV of the Constitution, enacted in 1918, created a new line of succession:

#	Office	Current officeholder
	Governor of Massachusetts	Maura Healey (D)
1	Lieutenant Governor	Kim Driscoll (D)
2	Secretary of the Commonwealth	William F. Galvin (D)
3	Attorney General	Andrea Campbell (D)
4	Treasurer and Receiver-General	Deb Goldberg (D)
5	Auditor	Diana DiZoglio (D)

== Cabinet ==
The governor has a 10-person cabinet, each of whom oversees a portion of the government under direct administration (as opposed to independent executive agencies). See Government of Massachusetts for a complete listing.

== Traditions ==
The front doors of the State House are only opened when a governor leaves office, a head of state or the president of the United States comes to visit the State House, or for the return of flags from Massachusetts regiments at the end of wars. The tradition of the ceremonial door originated when departing governor Benjamin Butler kicked open the front door and walked out by himself in 1884.

Incoming governors usually choose at least one past governor's portrait to hang in their office.

Immediately before being sworn into office, the governor-elect receives four symbols from the departing governor: the ceremonial pewter "Key" for the governor's office door, the Butler Bible, the "Gavel", and a two-volume set of the Massachusetts General Statutes with a personal note from the departing governor to their successor added to the back of the text. The governor-elect is then escorted by the sergeant-at-arms to the House Chamber and sworn in by the President of the Senate before a joint session of the House and Senate.

=== Lone walk ===
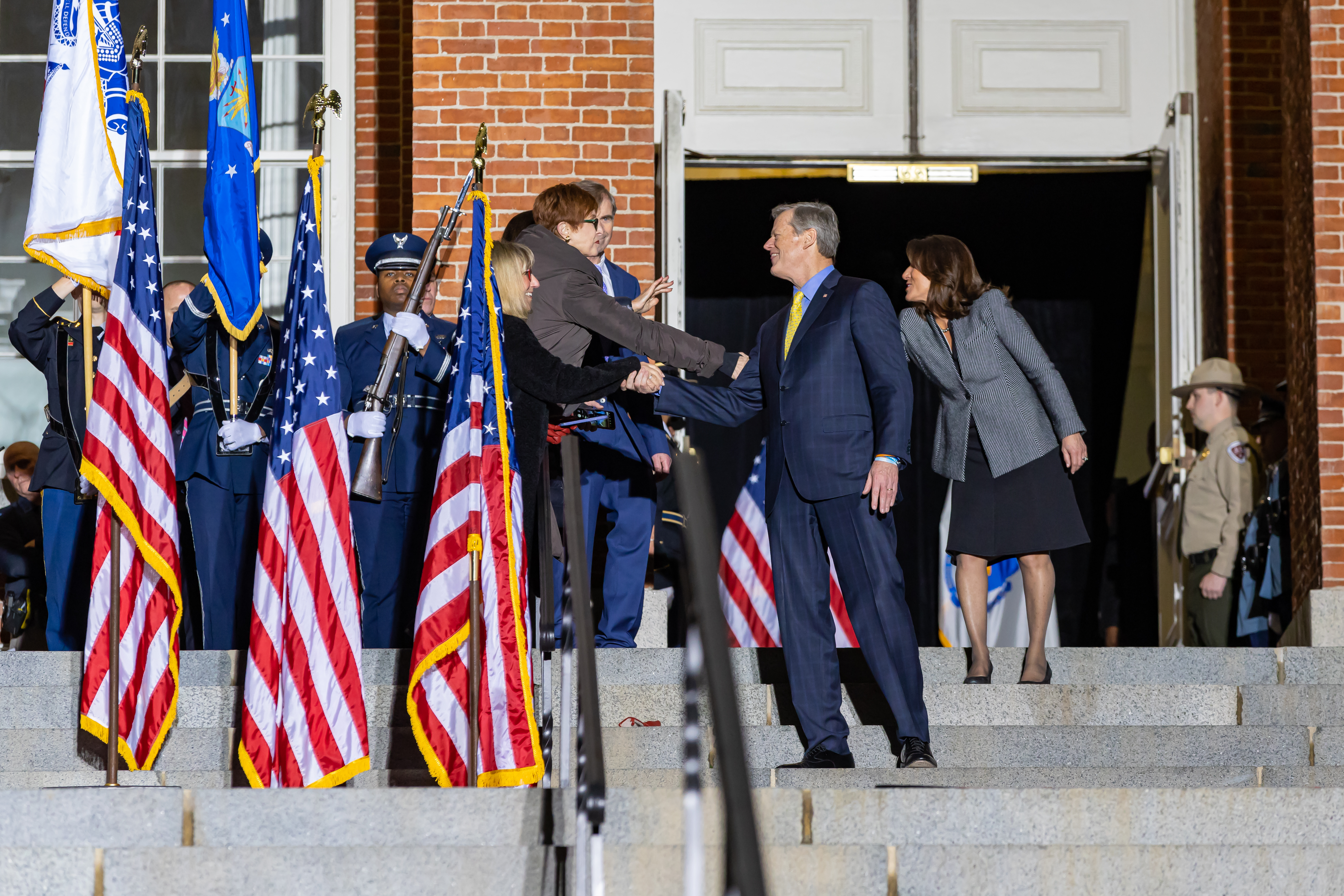
Outgoing Governor Charlie Baker and Lieutenant Governor Karyn Polito exit the State House for the lone walk in 2023

Upon completion of their term, the departing governor takes a "lone walk" down the Grand Staircase, through the House of Flags, into Doric Hall, out the central doors, and down the steps of the Massachusetts State House. The governor then crosses the street into Boston Common, thereby symbolically rejoining the commonwealth as a private citizen. Benjamin Butler started the tradition in 1884. Some walks have been modified with some past governors having their wives, friends, or staff accompany them. A 19-gun salute is offered during the walk, and frequently the steps are lined by the outgoing governor's friends and supporters.

In January 1991, outgoing lieutenant governor Evelyn Murphy, the first woman elected to statewide office in Massachusetts, walked down the stairs before Governor Michael Dukakis. In a break from tradition, the January 2007 inauguration of Governor Deval Patrick took place the day after outgoing governor Mitt Romney took the lone walk down the front steps.

== Governor's residence ==
Despite several proposals for establishing an official residence for the governor of Massachusetts, the Commonwealth of Massachusetts does not have a governor's mansion.

In 1955, Governor Foster Furcolo turned down a proposal to establish the Shirley–Eustis House in Roxbury, built by royal Governor William Shirley, as the official residence.

At one time, Governor John A. Volpe accepted the donation of the Endicott Estate in Dedham from the heirs of Henry Bradford Endicott. He intended to renovate the 19th-century mansion into a splendid governor's residence. After Volpe resigned to become United States Secretary of Transportation in the Nixon administration, the plan was aborted by his successor in consideration of budgetary constraints and because the location was considered too far from the seat of power, the State House in Boston.

Prior to their respective demolitions in 1922 and 1863, the Province House and the Hancock Manor were also proposed as official residences.

Since the governor has no official residence, the expression "corner office", rather than "governor's mansion", is commonly used in the press as a metonym for the office of governor. This refers instead to the governor's office on the third floor of the State House.

== Timeline ==
Timeline of Massachusetts governors

== See also ==
- List of governors of Massachusetts
- First ladies and gentlemen of Massachusetts
