= The Literary World =

The Literary World may refer to:

- The Literary World (Boston), a magazine of literary criticism, published from Boston 1870–1904
- The Literary World (New York City), a weekly American magazine, founded in New York City 1847–1852
