= Province House =

Province House may refer to:

- Province House (Nova Scotia) in Halifax, Nova Scotia, which houses the Nova Scotia House of Assembly
- Province House (Prince Edward Island) in Charlottetown, Prince Edward Island, which houses the Legislative Assembly of Prince Edward Island
- Province House (Boston, Massachusetts), residence of colonial governors of the Province of Massachusetts Bay
