= Old Harbor U.S. Life Saving Station =

Life-saving museum on Cape Cod

Old Harbor U.S. Life Saving Station Museum
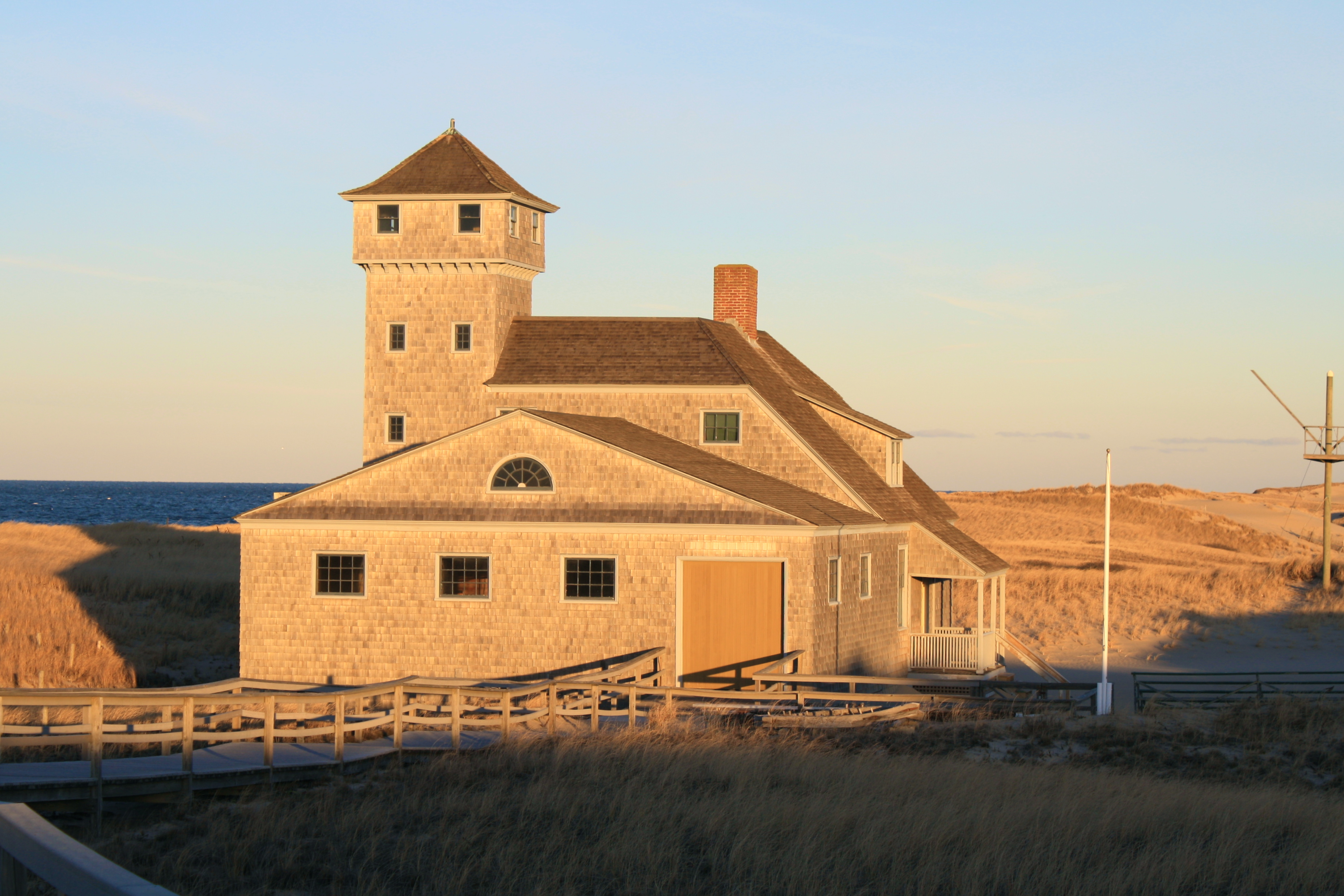

- Museum site, Race Point Beach
- Established: 1978
- Location: Race Point Beach, Cape Cod National Seashore, Massachusetts
- Coordinates: 42°04′48″N 70°12′59″W
- Collections: A typical life-saving station, circa 1900, with surfboat, dory, and breeches buoy
- Curator: Cape Cod National Seashore
- Owner: National Park Service
- Parking: Race Point Beach lot
- Website: Official website
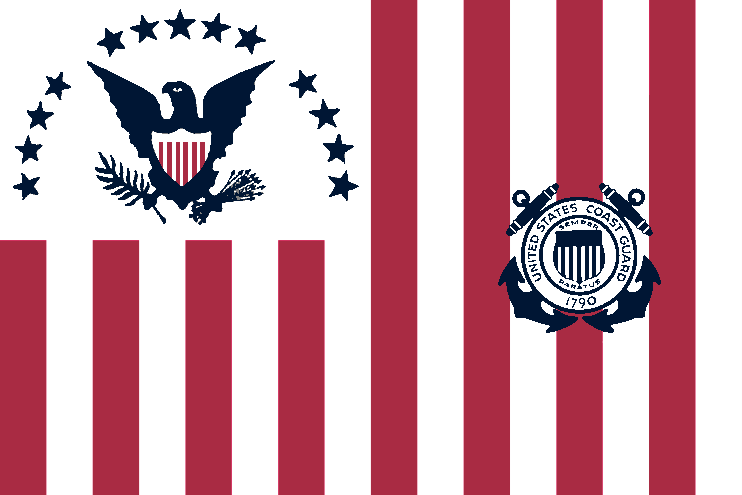
- Old Harbor Coast Guard Station
- Part of 1st District, Station #41
- Chatham, Massachusetts, at Nauset Beach
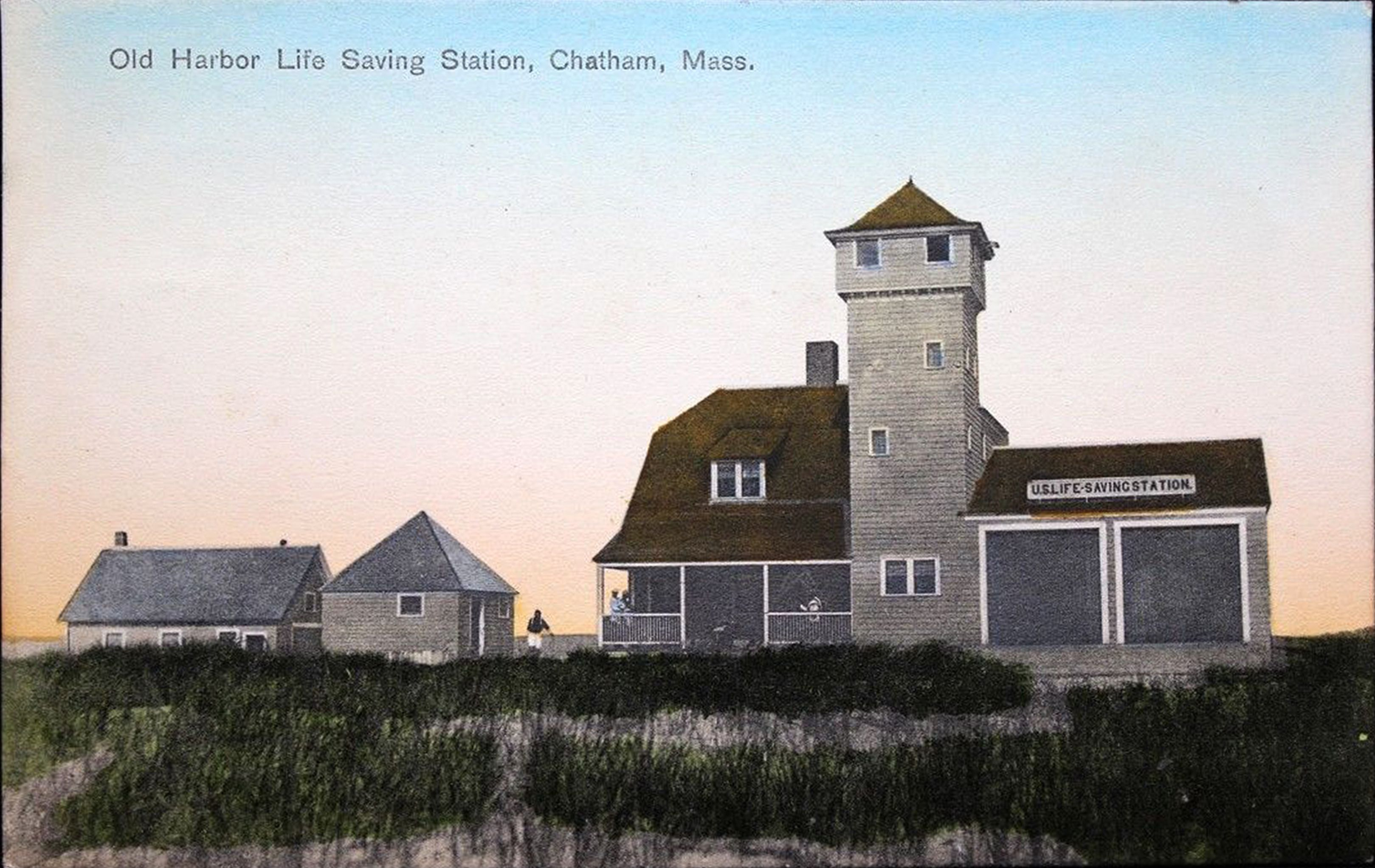

Site information
- Owner: United States Coast Guard

Location
- Original site, northeast of Chatham on Nauset Beach
- Coordinates: 41°41′52″N 69°55′47″W

Site history
- In use: 1915–1944
- Fate: February 10, 1947; Abandoned; sold as surplus; used as private residence
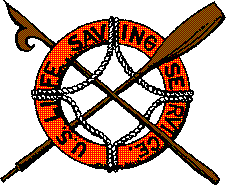
- Old Harbor U.S. Life Saving Station
- Part of 2nd District
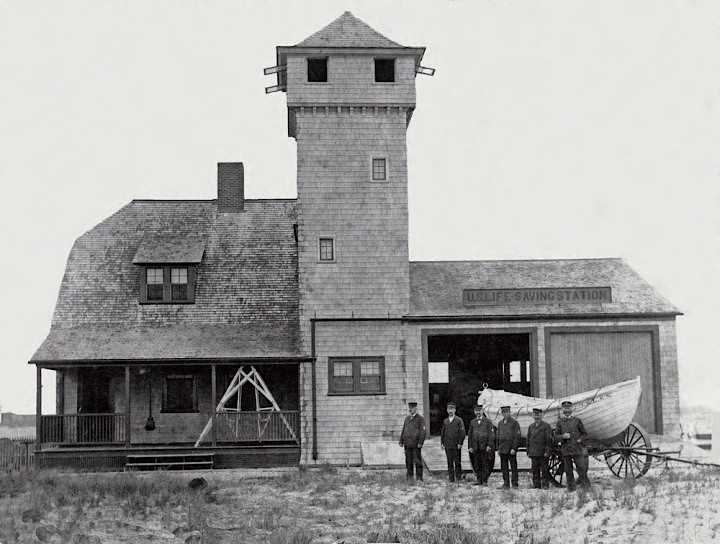

Site information
- Owner: United States Life-Saving Service

Site history
- Built: 1897
- In use: 1898–1915
- Fate: USLSS merged w/ Revenue Cutter Service in 1915; services continued as Coast Guard station
- Old Harbor U.S. Life Saving Station
- U.S. National Register of Historic Places
- Nearest city: Provincetown, Massachusetts
- Built: 1897
- Built by: J. S. Randall of Portland, Maine, for United States Life-Saving Service
- Architect: George R. Tolman
- Architectural style: Shingle; "Duluth" type w/ jerkin-head gable roof & four-story tower
- NRHP reference No.: 75000159
- Added to NRHP: August 18, 1975

The Old Harbor U.S. Life Saving Station is a historic maritime rescue station and museum, located at Race Point Beach in Provincetown, Massachusetts. Built in 1897, it was originally located at Nauset Beach near the entrance to Chatham Harbor in Chatham, Massachusetts. It was used by the United States Life-Saving Service (USLSS), and then by its successor, the United States Coast Guard (USCG), as the Old Harbor Coast Guard Station. The station was decommissioned in 1944, abandoned and sold as surplus in 1947, and was used as a private residence for the next twenty-six years.

The property returned to Federal ownership in 1973, acquired by the National Park Service as part of the Cape Cod National Seashore. The building was added to the National Register of Historic Places in 1975. Two years later, facing the threat of imminent destruction from extreme beach erosion, it was removed, cut in half, and floated by barge to Provincetown. The Park Service rehabilitated it and furnished it as it would have existed during its original use as a turn-of-the-century life-saving station. The Old Harbor U.S. Life Saving Station Museum opened at its new location in 1978.

== History ==
The Old Harbor Station was built in 1897 by the United States Life-Saving Service. The design for this station was first created by USLSS architect George R. Tolman in 1893 for a prototype station on Lake Superior in Duluth, Minnesota. In all, the USLSS used that same design to build twenty-eight stations in the "Duluth style." This style resulted from a gradual evolution to replace the simple pitched-roof structures of 1872, and featured a large truncated, or jerkin-head gable roof. The rectangular floor plan was divided into two sections. One side of the building contained the living space, including a keeper's room, office, kitchen and mess room with sleeping quarters above for crew and rescuees. On the other side was a single-story, two-bay boat room. The Duluth departed even further from the norm by adding a large, rectangular, off-center, four-story lookout tower between the sections on the front of the building.

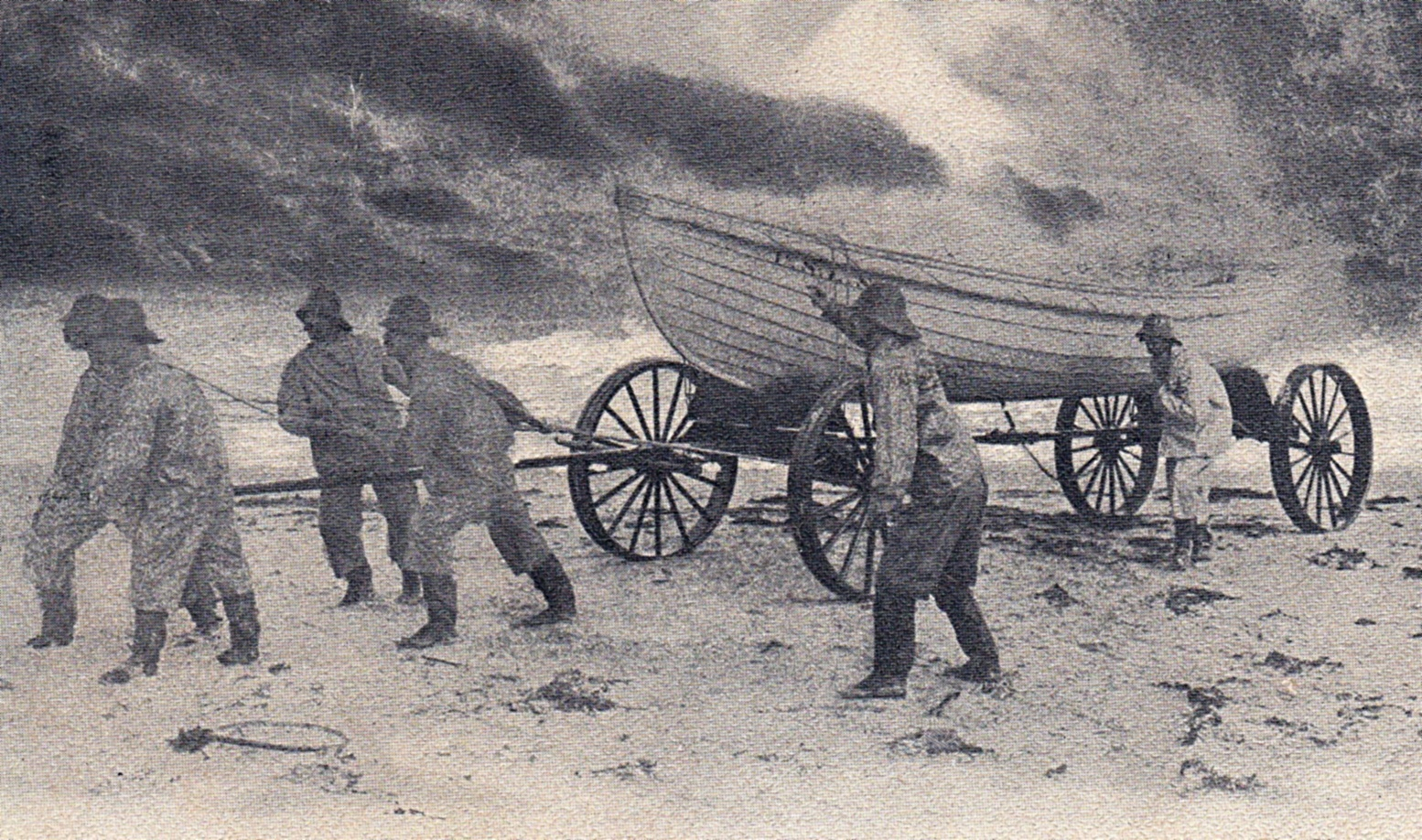
A 1906 postcard captioned, The start of the life-boat, Cape Cod

The first keeper was assigned on November 23, 1897. During its first five years of operation, crews from this station rescued 21 persons by surfboat, and extracted an additional 13 people by breeches buoy. The latter would be deployed when the sea was too rough for the surfboat to reach a vessel in distress.

In 1915, the USLSS was merged with the United States Revenue Cutter Service to form the United States Coast Guard. The renamed Old Harbor Coast Guard Station (Station #41) continued to operate until it was decommissioned in 1944. It was abandoned and sold as surplus on February 10, 1947, and used as a privately owned residence for the next twenty-six years.

In 1973, the station was returned to federal ownership, when the National Park Service acquired it as part of the surrounding Cape Cod National Seashore. That same year, the Historian of the National Park Service nominated the building for inclusion in the National Register of Historic Places, and it was so added in 1975.

In 1977, the former life-saving station was itself rescued from the sea, for the land upon which it stood was about to be reclaimed by the Atlantic Ocean. At present, the land upon which the structure once stood has been washed away, and the site is fully submerged.

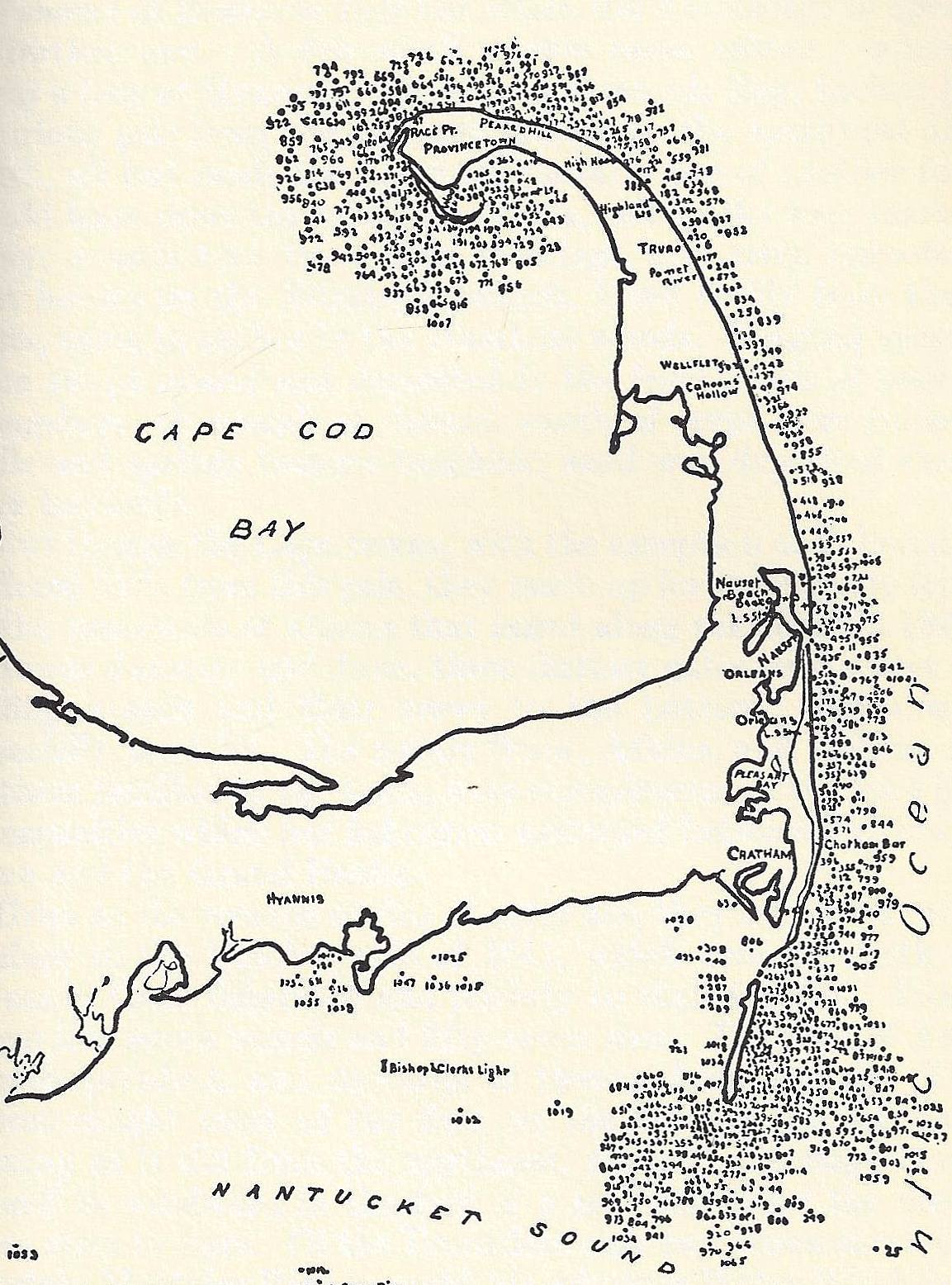
Approximate locations of Cape Cod wrecks through 1903

== Preservation and relocation ==
Nauset Beach, upon which this structure was originally located, is a barrier beach contained within a narrow spit of sand. This barrier beach is a high wave-energy environment that bears the brunt of severe winter storms in the Atlantic Ocean. That makes the location and configuration of the beach extremely variable, due to the natural processes of rapid erosion and accretion of sand.

When it was built in 1897, the station was roughly centered upon the spit, with about 500 feet (150 m) of beach to both the east and west. In 1910, a survey showed that the beach had grown to 600 feet (180 m) on the Atlantic Ocean side of the station. By 1940, the beach on that side had grown to 1,000 feet (300 m), with 10-to-12-foot-high (3.0–3.7 m) dunes. By 1966, however, only 100 feet (30 m) of beach separated the building from the high-water line, and by 1977, "waves were breaking against the foundation of the Old Harbor Station." It had become clear that the barrier beach was migrating westward.

In nominating this station for inclusion in the National Register of Historic Places, the National Park Service justified the need to preserve this structure:

Very rapid encroachment by the sea makes some sort of preservation action vital. If the station is not moved very soon, the ocean will claim it as it has several other such stations in recent years. ... From Monomoy to Provincetown, some forty miles, there remains only the Old Harbor station as the oldest of these buildings remaining on the shores of Cape Cod National Seashore.

This old station is a rare reminder of the days of sail, the days when shipwrecks were commonplace. Heroism of the highest order was made manifest by the acts of the small crews who manned the surfboats and set up the elaborate breeches buoy equipment to save lives in unbelievably terrible weather. ...

In retrospect, the old Life Saving Service ... was the single most important activity on Cape Cod for seventy years – add another 75 years of sea rescue work by the Massachusetts Humane Society from 1795, and we have over a century and a half of heroism which should not be forgotten. ... [Old Harbor station's] historical value, as representative of a vital part of the Cape's past, is obvious. Soon, no Coast Guard buildings will remain.

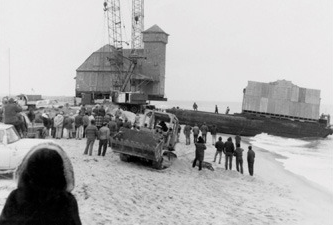
The first half of Old Harbor Station is hoisted from the barge in Provincetown (1978).

In the fall of 1977, the National Park Service moved the station by cutting it in half, loading it onto a barge, and floating it to Provincetown. In February 1978, it weathered the record-breaking Blizzard of 1978 while still on the barge in Provincetown Harbor. Later that year, it was reassembled on a new foundation at Race Point Beach, rehabilitated, and opened to the public as a museum park exhibit.

In 2008, the station underwent a major rehabilitation, with an allocated budget of $489,000 to perform significant repairs to the interior and exterior of the building.

== Present-day use ==
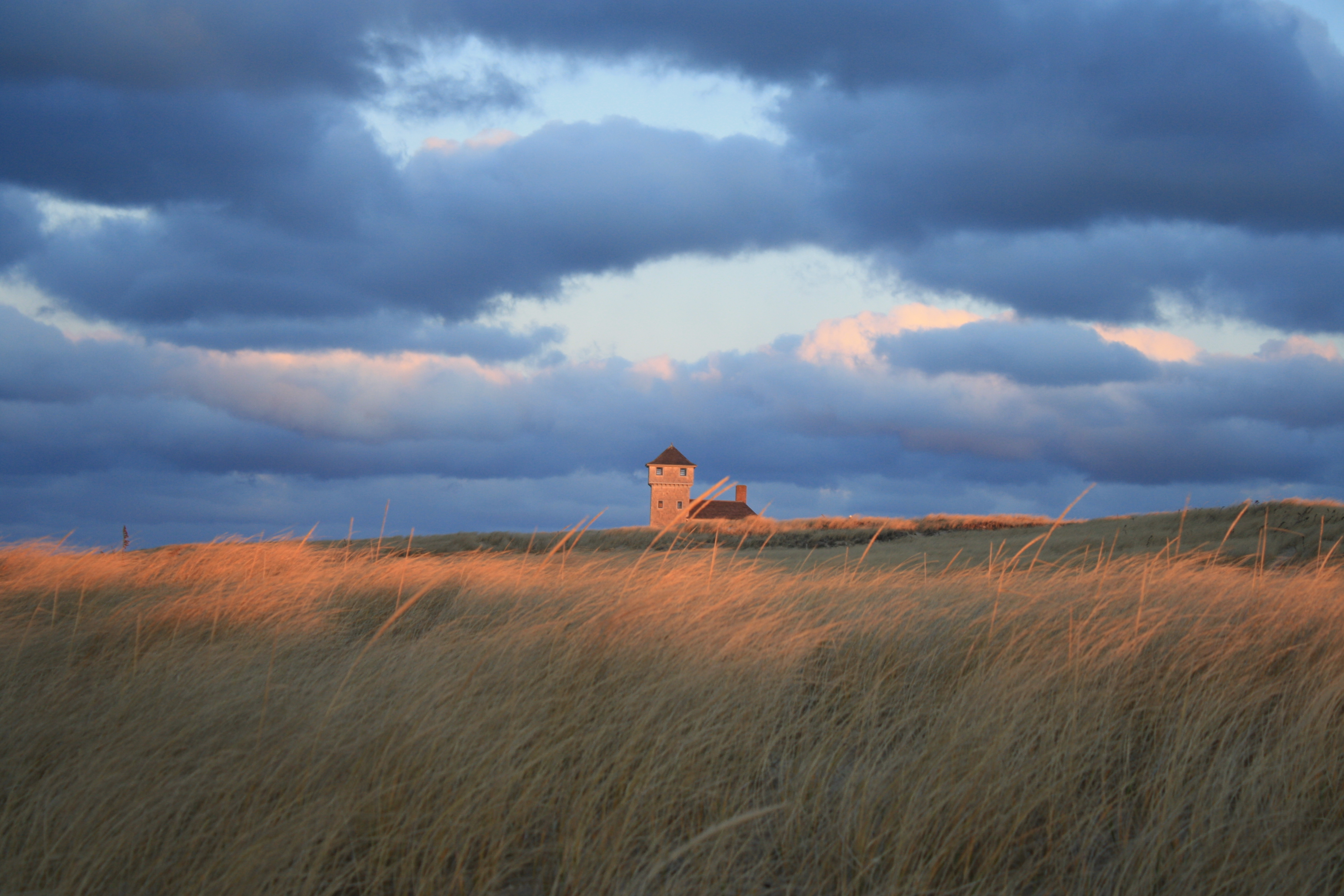

The Park Service has restored and furnished the station as it would have existed at the turn of the twentieth century, complete with the original Race Point surfboat and dory. During the summer season, it is open to the public daily as a self-guided museum exhibit each afternoon. Admission is included with standard beach access fees. In addition, every Thursday in July and August at 5 p.m., park rangers conduct a live demonstration to reenact the historic "Beach Apparatus Drill", a weekly exercise used by the United States Life-Saving Service to train for the rescue of shipwrecked mariners. The drill includes deployment of a breeches buoy to effect a rescue.

== See also ==
- National Register of Historic Places listings in Barnstable County, Massachusetts
- Race Point Light
- Breeches buoy
