= Stephen Badlam =

American artisan and military officer (1751–1815)

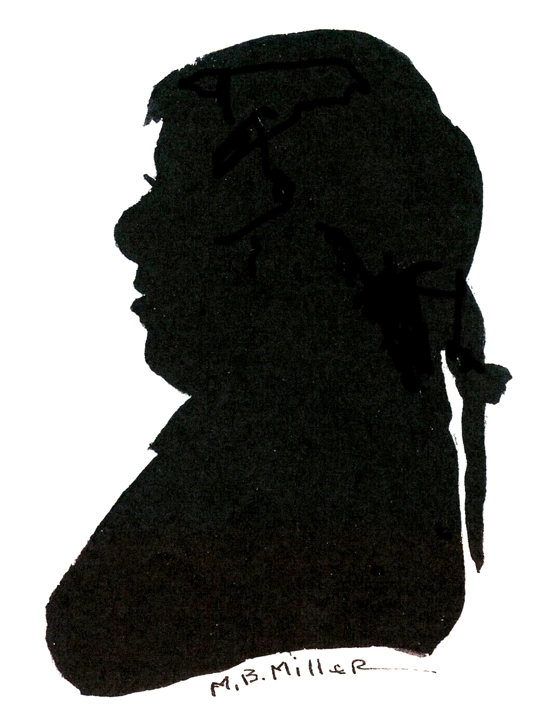
- Silhouette of Badlam
- Born: May 7, 1751; Milton, Province of Massachusetts Bay
- Died: August 25, 1815 (aged 64); Dorchester, Massachusetts, United States
- Occupations: Cabinetmaker; Military officer; Surveyor
- Spouses: Mary (died 1794) Elizabeth Turner (m. 1798)
- Children: 7

Mark
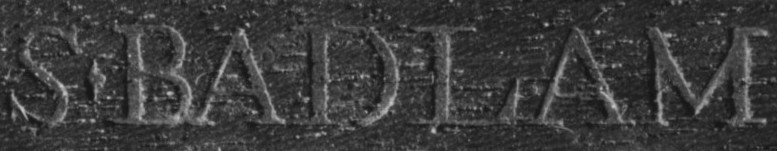

Stephen Badlam (May 7, 1751 – August 25, 1815) was an American artisan and military officer. Raised in Dorchester, Massachusetts, Badlam was orphaned as a young child following the death of his father, a tavern-keeper and cabinetmaker. Badlam worked as a surveyor prior to the American Revolutionary War, where he served as an artillery commander in engagements in New York, Canada, and Vermont, serving as a major in General Richard Montgomery's ill-fated 1775 invasion of Quebec. After serving at Fort Stanwix, he fell gravely ill and was forced to return home with his wife to Dorchester.

While continuing to work as a surveyor for some time, he became a successful furniture artisan, specializing in the construction of ornate cabinets and looking-glasses, alongside frames, chairs, and windows. He served for over two decades as a justice of the peace in Dorchester, as well as a brigadier-general in the Massachusetts militia. He helped to organize the Second Church of Dorchester, where he served as a deacon and supporter of controversial Reverend John Codman.

== Early life ==
Stephen Badlam was born in Milton, Massachusetts, on May 7, 1751, to Hannah (c. 1723 – c. 1756) (Note: Some sources put Hannah Badlam's death in 1758, 4 days prior to the death of husband, but others state she died in 1756 and that his father remarried prior to his death. Hannah's date, but not year, of death is listed on her grave.) and Stephen Badlam Sr. (1721–1758), a tavern-keeper and part-time cabinetmaker originally from Weymouth. Stephen Badlam Sr. was appointed as a deacon in Canton (at the time part of Stoughton) at age 29, and served in this capacity until his death eight years later.

Badlam's siblings included Hannah, William, and Ezra Badlam. Orphaned at a young age, Stephen Badlam grew up at the Lower Mills in Dorchester (now part of Boston), receiving limited formal education at a local district school. He trained in cabinetmaking and pursued surveying as a profession.

== Career ==
=== Revolutionary War ===
As the American Revolutionary War began in 1775, Badlam enlisted in the Continental Army. He was commissioned as a second lieutenant in the New York City artillery under General Henry Lee, and was over the following year promoted to first lieutenant and captain. While stationed in New York, he became acquainted with Alexander Hamilton, and was appreciated for his engineering abilities. He reportedly was well-liked by George Washington, who would serve as a political inspiration for Badlam throughout his life. He was appointed to major and transferred to service as an artillery commander under General Richard Montgomery in his invasion of Quebec, sailing north along the Hudson River.

Following the invasion's failure, he returned to Fort Crown Point. On July 4, 1776, he captured a fortified Vermont hill near Ticonderoga, and on July 18 named it Mount Independence, a name later confirmed by General Horatio Gates. There, he had helped and directed the building of fortifications in the region. During his service, he met the Marquis de Lafayette, who granted Badlam a sword. After fighting at Fort Stanwix under Colonel Marinus Willett in August 1777, Badlam fell under a serious fever. Gravely ill and unable to serve military duties, physicians considered his recovery unlikely, and he resigned service to return to Dorchester. While ill, he reported to have undergone an intense religious experience and prayed for his recovery.

=== Cabinet and furniture artistry ===
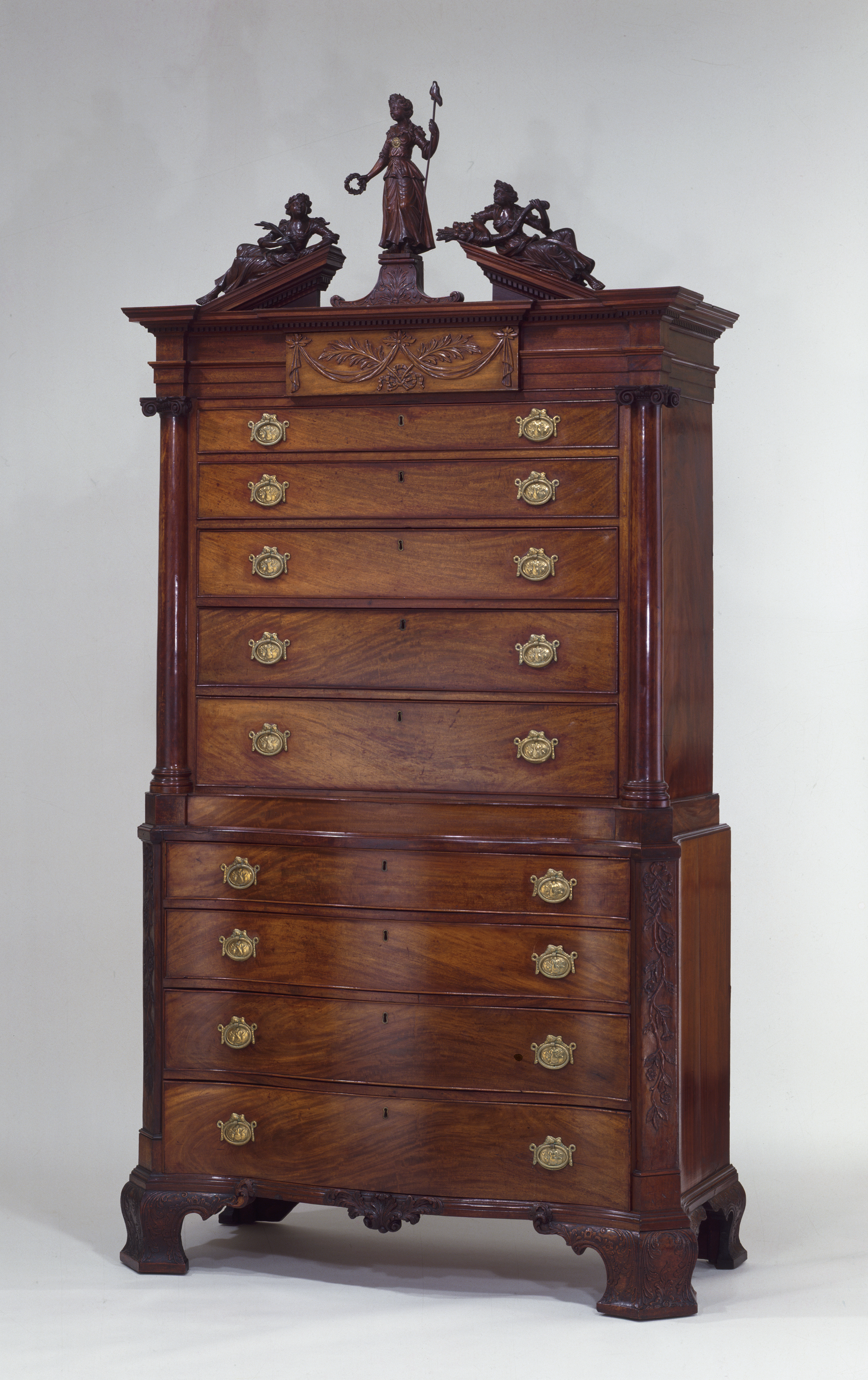
Chest-on-chest by Badlam, 1791, with sculptures in pediment by John and Simeon Skillin

Badlam recovered from his illness soon after returning to Dorchester with his wife Mary. Shortly afterwards, Badlam had his first daughter, Polly. Continuing in his career as a surveyor, he plotted Dorchester and neighboring towns. By 1780, he had become a very well-respected cabinet artisan, with a workshop on Old Plymouth Road (now River St.) in the Lower Mills. He frequently collaborated with other artisans and cabinetmakers, frequently doing turning for others. As well as cabinetry, he built and sold picture frames, chairs, windows, looking-glasses, and advertised skills in molding and gilding. Badlam's apprentices included Abiel White and Abner Hersey.

He built many cabinets for wealthy Boston merchant Elias Hasket Derby. In 1791, he built for Derby a chest-on-chest in mahogany and pine, featuring neoclassical personifications of Peace, Plenty, and America sculpted by brothers John and Simeon Skillin. This chest would be used as a wedding present for Derby's daughter. He built various pieces of furniture in Heppelwhite style, including a side chair held at the Metropolitan Museum of Art.

== Civil and religious service ==
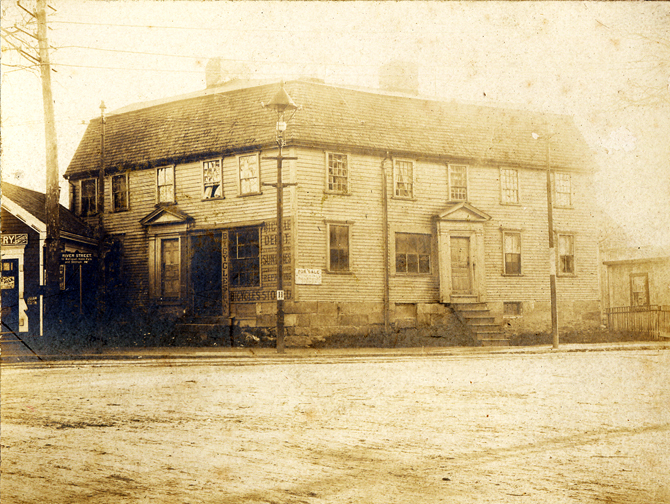
Late 19th century view of the Stephen Badlam House in Dorchester, of which he gave up a portion to be used as an annual school.

In 1791 Badlam was appointed as a local justice of the peace, reappointed to this position five times until his death in 1815. In 1800, he was reappointed to military service as a brigadier-general of the First Brigade of the Massachusetts Militia, serving in this position until 1808. Despite having no formal education, he served on various school committees. Along with multiple other local figures, he raised $1200 to build four schoolhouses in Dorchester, as well as giving up the southwest corner of his house to be used as an annual school.

He was the first vice-president of the Dorchester Washington Benevolent Society, part of a network of Federalist political clubs. He also helped organize the Second Church of Dorchester, where he served as a senior deacon from 1808 until his death. Here he was an active supporter of Reverend John Codman during a prolonged theological controversy with other church authorities. He was heavily opposed to Unitarianism and Universalism, believing them to discredit the holiness of Jesus and lessen moral obligations.

== Personal life ==
Badlam had seven children, all with his first wife, Mary: Polly, Stephen, Abigail, Nancy, Lucretia, John, and Clarissa. Abigail died at age 11, but all others lived to adulthood. Stephen Badlam Jr. (b. December 2, 1779) would continue his father's work of a surveyor and artisan of cabinets and looking-glasses, with one of his labels known from a surviving mahogany shaving mirror.

His first wife, Mary, died in 1794. In 1798, Badlam remarried to Elizabeth Turner.

Badlam died in Dorchester on August 25, 1815, recorded as due to a stroke of palsy. Rev. Codman conducted and published a sermon in his honor.
