= Peter Sergeant =

Late 17th and early 18th century merchant in Boston

Coat of Arms of Peter Sargent

Peter Sergeant (died 1714) was a merchant in Boston, Massachusetts, in the late 17th and early 18th century. Born in England, he later moved to Boston. He served as town constable in 1674, and as a Councillor 1692–1703 and 1707–1714. He was a member of the Third Church congregation attending services at the Cedar House and later at the Old South Meeting House. He was also associated with the New England Company. During the 1689 Boston revolt, he participated in the Committee of Safety that ousted governor Edmund Andros. In 1679, Sergeant built a large house on old Marlborough Street, and lived there for most of the rest of his life. He left briefly 1699–ca.1700, in order to accommodate royal governor Richard Coote, 1st Earl of Bellomont. (After 1716 the Sergeant House was known as the Province House). Sergeant married four times: to Elizabeth Corwin; to Elizabeth, daughter of Henry Shrimpton (1682–1700); to Mary Phips (1701–1706); and to Mehitable Cooper (1706–1714). His funeral was held on February 13, 1714; he is buried in the Granary Burying Ground.
