= Nathan Carruth =

American railroad pioneer (1808–1881)

Nathan Carruth (December 25, 1808 – May 19, 1881) was an American railroad pioneer.

== Early life ==
Nathan Carruth, fourth son of Francis and Mary Hale Carruth, was educated in his native town North Brookfield, Massachusetts and resided there until seventeen years old. Coming to Boston in 1825, in the succeeding year he was employed as a clerk by a concern engaged in the West India goods trade, and he then served an apprenticeship in the drug store of Messrs. Fletcher and Carruth. After the dissolution of that firm in 1831, he entered into partnership with his brother Francis Sumner, under the firm name of F.S. & N. Carruth. They were associated in business for eight years, at the expiration of which time Nathan Carruth formed a co-partnership with his younger brother Charles, under the firm name of N. & C. Carruth. The latter concern had a most successful career in the drug business in Boston, covering a period of almost 40 years.

The revolutionizing of traffic made possible by the advent of steam as a motive power found a most enthusiastic supporter in Nathan Carruth, who devoted much time, energy, and capital to the introduction of railway lines in Massachusetts and other New England States. Nathan Carruth's advocating of railway lines in Massachusetts began with the Western Railroad around 1832. A railway line he would later sit on the Board of Directors of between 1840-1842. In Carruth's early years of advocating he became interested in their development and the first Old Colony Memorial Railroad in 1835 was organized and contracted to build the line, to run from the end of the Taunton Branch Railroad. The Old Colony Memorial Railroad later incorporating into the first Old Colony Railroad Corporation in 1838. Carruth not only labored to promote their establishment, but after their completion he took an active interest in their welfare. After several years of successful and profitable operation of the Western Railroad and the Taunton Branch Railroad, the movement of expanding railways south of, and around Boston, and other New England states began in 1842. Nathan Carruth once again found himself advocating for railroads expansion. This period of advocating lasted nearly two years and simply put, pitted railroad expansion advocates against farmers. By 1842 Carruth's experience and success with the Western Railroad became a powerful tool in advocating the recreation of the Old Colony Railroad Corporation and expanding on the proposed line south of Boston. In 1842 a town hall meeting was held in Dorchester and is recorded as a much lively debate in which all kinds of accusing statements were made on all sides. Farmers being fearful of an iron monster of the day. Problems were seen in the city of Boston expanding with railways to their farming community, where some of the argument's anti-rail expansion advocates argued. Carruth was a Republican. in 1842 the Republican party in Massachusetts was enjoying good public opinion with the success of every railroad built to that point. Additional effects of railroads were being documented in 1842 that somewhat sold themselves, to name a few where increased value of land around the Western Railroad's line, and farmers along the Western Railroad's line enjoyed increased profits on crops. The benefit of delivering Boston's and Massachusetts crops and goods to Boston port's became the focus of the Old Colony Railroad and the Republican Party railway supporter's advocating in 1843. The argument and documented effect meant that Boston's economy would grow with rails expansion. An argument anti-rail expansion advocates would not be able to overcome and in March 1844 the Old Colony Railroad was once again reborn under Nathan Carruth.

== Old Colony Railroad Corporation ==
Besides being the first president and general manager of the Old Colony Railroad Corporation, he was for a number of years Director and Treasurer of the Northern Railroad of New Hampshire, and Director of the Dorchester and Milton Branch Railroad. He continued his involvement with railway advocating with the Old Colony Street Railway and the Metropolitan Railroad, Massachusetts up until 1875, when the last Boston Globe newspaper article is found about Nathan Carruth. During this period between 1854–1874, Carruth was the president of the Dorchester Gaslight Company, co-founder and Director of Cedar Grove Cemetery and a director of the Mattapan Bank. The massive Old Colony system, which began under Nathan Carruth, fell under lease to the New York, New Haven and Hartford Railroad on March 1, 1893. The NYNH&H merged into Penn Central in 1969, which was in turn merged into Conrail in 1976, the lines in New England now being CSX Transportation.

== Ashmont ==
In 1847 Carruth moved to Dorchester, laying out at great expense a most attractive estate in what is now known as Ashmont. An Andrew J. Downing inspired Gothic Victorian estate was designed by Victorian architect Luther Briggs, also designer of the Old Colony Railroad headquarters in 1844. Starting sometime with 1849 approval of The Old Colony Railroad's Ashmont Station, Nathan Carruth along with business partner Charles Dodge, a Boston Shipping Company owner, built three estate houses directly off the Ashmont T's 1850 station in the architect style suggested by Andrew J. Downing 1842 Cottage Residences Books, Nathan Carruth House was in a Gothic Irregular style, Charles Dodges Carruth Hill estate was in an Italian Symmetrical style, and closest to Ashmont's Train 1850 Station, was a small English Style resident, all laid out as the 1842 Andrew J. Downing estate ground layout suggested. As the Andrew J Downing Building theory of the irregular shape house and the symmetrical house shape suggests the start to building Victorian American communities. Nathan Carruth, using the talents of a young local Dorchester architect Luther Briggs Jr., began engaging in the promoting and development of South Dorchester's neighborhoods. Carruth continued to look to the services of Victorian Architect Luther Briggs Jr., in this promoting to build Dorchester neighborhoods, and even engaged Briggs services in laying out the streets in Carruth's personal Railroad Suburb vision on Carruth Hill. Many early concepts of transit oriented development by Dr. Lardner and Andrew J. Downing were applied in real life for the first time along the Old Colony Railroad's South line in this early relationship between Nathan Carruth and a young Luther Briggs Jr. and led to many buildings showing up around the Old Colony system line's between 1844–1880, which after 1850 were creating a circle around both Carruth Hill and Pope's Hill in Dorchester. Part of an overall early Transit Oriented Development Design Site Plan by Luther Briggs Jr. embedding the Old Colony Railroad as a Gothic Railroad Suburb Design. The First American Master Planned Community outlaid of sorts. Which led to Luther Briggs Jr. to actually design a smaller section with the first planned suburb community, known as Port Norfolk, South Boston today. In 1854 Carruth co-founded, along with William Pope, the Dorchester Gaslight Company. This began offering services to South Dorchester neighborhoods, which in the mid-1850s into the 1870s consisted largely of Victorian estates of several acres or more. Many were designed by Luther Briggs Jr. in the Andrew J. Downing and Calvert Vaux suggested styles. With the Old Colony Railroad Lines in Dorchester and the formation of the Dorchester Gaslight company, South Dorchester experienced growth that turned a farming community into an estate suburb, which in turn led to the City of Boston annexing Dorchester in 1870. With these events in place and now City of Boston services with streets, water, and sewage. Dorchester and South Dorchester experienced the first recorded housing boom and bust, in 1870 and 1873. This helped lead the United States into a mini-depression and, in Dorchester, the real estate market took about seven years to recover.

Nathan Carruth's estate and personal railroad suburb vision was on the east side of Dorchester Avenue called Beechmont/Beaumont and would become one of the first railroad suburbs, taking nearly 30 years to build, although it was not fully realized in his lifetime. Nathan's estate which started at 12 acres (49,000 m^{2}) than grow to as much as 28 acres (110,000 m^{2}) was a long and tireless vision that at its end was finished by Nathan Carruth's son, Herbert S. Carruth. The Old Colony Railroad line started it, by having reasonable means to assess downtown Boston, the Dorchester Gaslight Company expanded it, by means of houses could receive the same services as living close into Boston. However, it was the annexation of Dorchester by Boston and the services brought by it that set Carruth's 30 year vision in solid stone that the South Boston Suburbs would again grow. Even though Nathan Carruth and Luther Briggs Jr. had been engaged in promoting and building houses around South Dorchester, outside of Nathan's Gothic Victorian house his personal vision of a neighborhood had not begun. It began in 1876-1877 with the building of 24 and 30 Beaumont Street. Beaumont Street, which was Carruth estate's private carriageway, became the display of the personal vision. 30 Beaumont Street, built for Nathan's 22-year-old son Herbert S. Carruth and his wife Anne F. Pope, was a Second Empire Italian Revival Victorian designed by Luther Briggs Jr., and was considered an old design style in 1877. It is noteworthy that out of 30 years, Luther Briggs Jr. designed in the Italian style up to 1877, and the 20 years after 1877, Luther Briggs is still an architect. Luther Briggs designed no more Italian style Victorian houses after 30 Beaumont Street's building. 24 Beaumont Street, a Romanesque Gothic Revival style, was designed by John Fox and built for a family member of William Pope. 24 and 30 Beaumont Street were an 1876-1877 Andrew J. Downing building theory again of the irregular house shape and the symmetrical house shape applied by Luther Briggs Jr., and used as sales models for the rest of the community to be built.

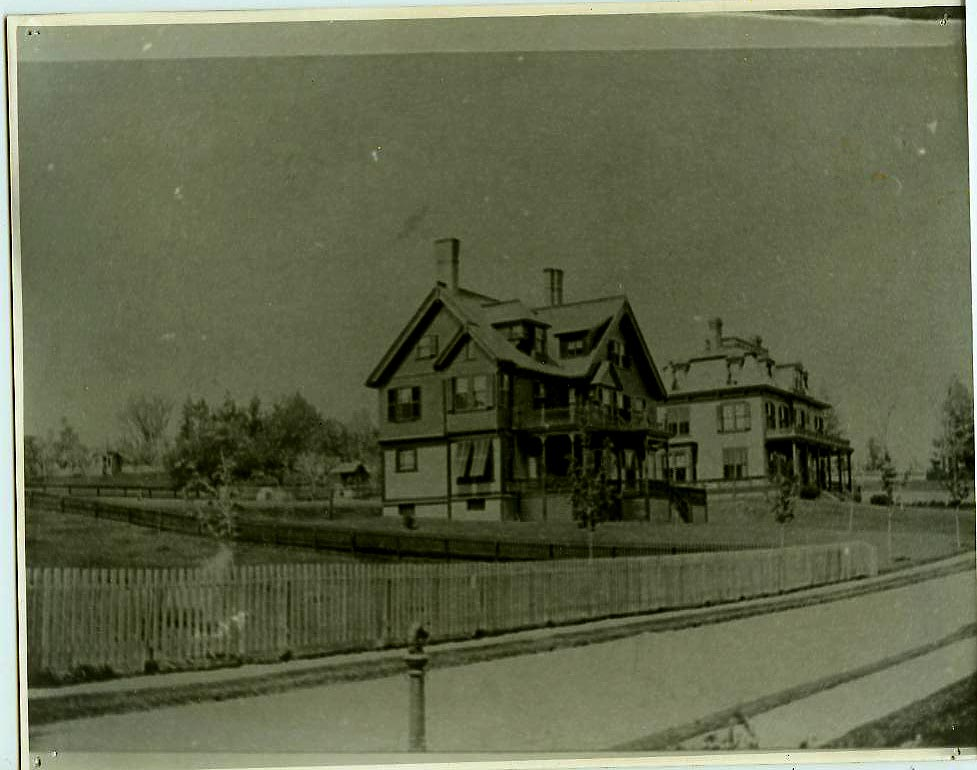
24 and 30 Beaumont Street South Boston Dorchester. Carruth Hill. Circa 1879, Picture view standing at Beaumont St. and Carruth St. In lower right corner can be seen a pole with a horse's head on top. That was the gate entry to Beaumont Street when Beaumont Street was a private driveway/carriageway owned by the Carruth family.

It was 24 and 30 Beaumont Street being built, a Community Building theory, that kicked off the development of the Carruth Street area in the early to mid-1880s, by Nathan Carruth's son, Herbert S. Carruth. By these two houses being on Carruth estate's (Nathan Carruth's property) private carriageway, deed restrictions were born in America. Nathan Carruth instructed his son Herbert S. Carruth on stabling horses as a business, and Dr. Lardner's use of property deed maintenance restrictions Nathan Carruth applied in railroads, which led Herbert S. Carruth to found the first house deed restrictions and community agreement to stable horses at the original 1847 Carruth Estate stables of the estate property. Herbert S. Carruth charged a maintenance fee for Beaumont Street and the community stables. By 1891, the Carruth Hill by Nathan Carruth's 1847 vision was only several years away from completion by Herbert S. Carruth.

== Personal life ==
Carruth married Sarah Ann Pratt, mother of Boston historian Edward Griffin Porter, in 1845. It was both of their second marriages, after the death of Royal Loomis Porter and Louisa Jones Pratt, both the previous year.

== Death ==
Nathan Carruth resided in Dorchester for the rest of his life and died at his home on May 19, 1881. He is buried at Cedar Grove Cemetery Ashmont, co-founded by Carruth and a part of the building of Nathan Carruth's Old Colony Railroad Victorian American suburb.

== Sources ==
- Herbert Carruth House, Heidi Kieffer
- Dorchesteratheneum.org
- Dorchester Historical Society, and President Earl Taylor
- Boston Public Library, historical newspapers, Boston Daily Globe Jan. 14, 1875, refer for Paragraph 3
- Sean T. Wright, Railroad & Development Historian, GGG Grandson of Nathan Carruth: Nathan, Herbert, Henry, Francis, Jane Wright, Published 1952 Carruth Family Genealogy
- StreetCar Suburbs: The Process of Growth in Boston 1870-1900 by Sam Bass Warner, published by Harvard University Press
- Report by Edward Zimmer 1977 to Historic New England on Luther Briggs Jr. use of Andrew J. Downing Cottage residences books series
