= Codman Square District =

- U.S. National Register of Historic Places
- U.S. Historic district
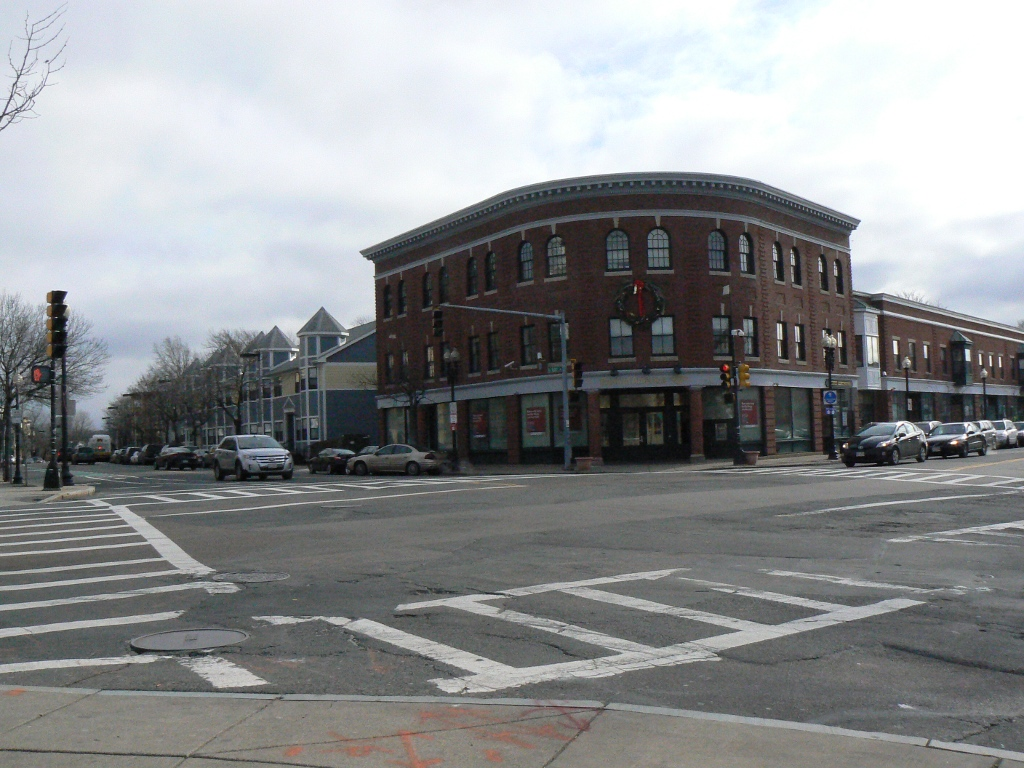

- Location within Greater Boston area Location within Massachusetts Location within the United States
- Location: Boston, Massachusetts
- Coordinates: 42°17′25″N 71°4′16″W
- Built: 1806
- Architect: Multiple
- Architectural style: Classical Revival, Federal
- NRHP reference No.: 83000602
- Added to NRHP: June 23, 1983

The Codman Square District is a historic district in the Dorchester neighborhood of Boston, Massachusetts. It consists of four of the most prominent properties facing the main Codman Square intersection, where Talbot Avenue and Washington Street cross. The area has a long history as a major civic center in Dorchester, and is now one of the large neighborhood's major commercial hubs. The properties in the district include the 1806 Congregational Church (now known as Second Church of Dorchester), the 1904 Codman Square branch of the Boston Public Library, the former Girls' Latin School building (opened in 1901 as Dorchester High School), and the Lithgow Building, a commercial brick structure at the southeast corner of the junction that was built in 1899.

The district was listed on the National Register of Historic Places in 1983.

== See also ==
- National Register of Historic Places listings in southern Boston, Massachusetts
