= Nauset Beach =

Beach on Cape Cod, Massachusetts, US

- Beach
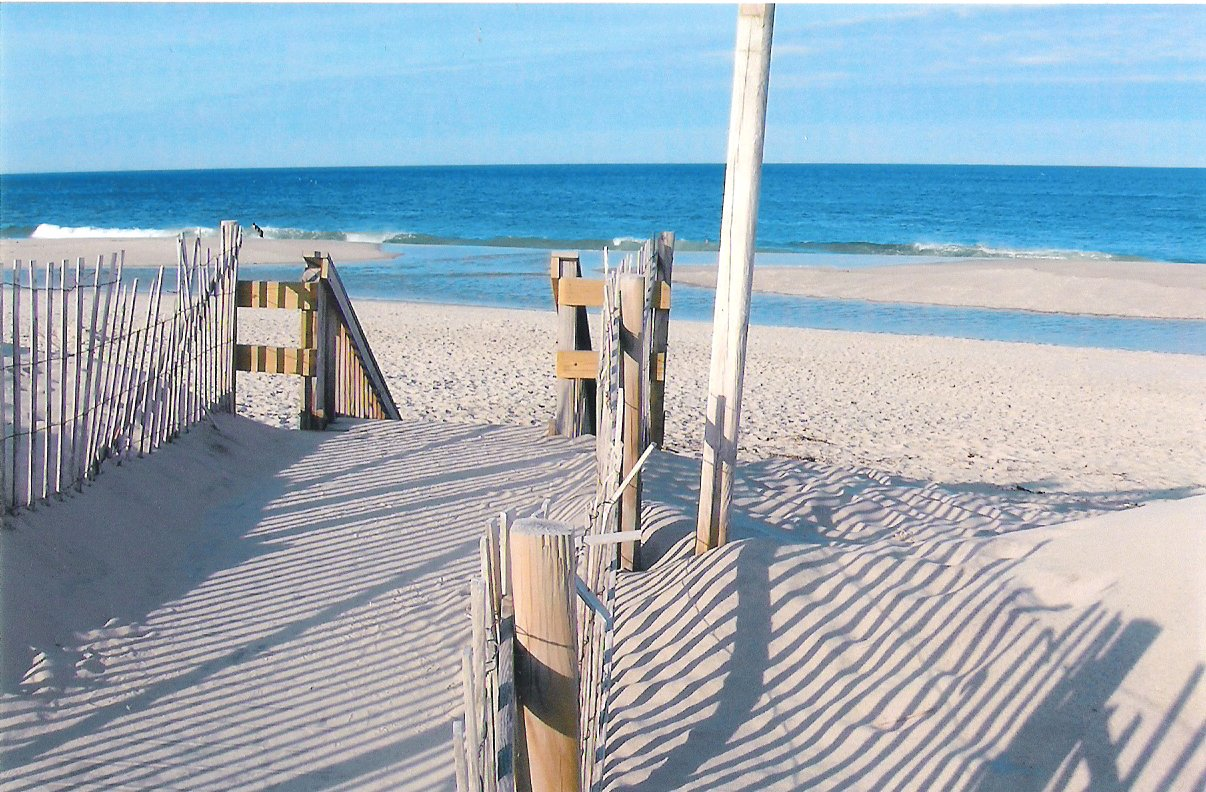
- Nauset Beach in 2009

- Coordinates: 41°50′26.1″N 69°57′07.5″W
- Location: Orleans, Massachusetts

Dimensions
  - Length: 6 miles (9.7 km)
- Patrolled by: Orleans D.P.W. & Natural Resources
- Access: 250 Beach Rd, Orleans, MA

Nauset Beach is a public beach on the east coast of outer Cape Cod in Orleans, Massachusetts, which extends south from a point opposite Nauset Bay to the mouth of Chatham Harbor. It is popular with swimmers, surfers, boogie boarders and fishermen. It, at times, offers some of the highest waves on Cape Cod. Furthermore, it is an excellent spot to view a sunrise.

Facilities include restrooms, showers, snack bar, off-road vehicle trails (permit required), a bike rack and a picnic area.

Surfing is permitted in the non-protected beach areas from 9 a.m. to 6 p.m. The beach is also available for off-road vehicles with the proper permit. There is striped bass and bluefish fishing.

Nauset Beach has seen increases in erosion due to sea level rise and very intense winter storms. Its iconic seaside clam shack, Liam's, was demolished after the beach next to the clam shack was destroyed by 20-foot waves during a 2018 storm. The beach erosion has also revealed old wagon tracks and hoofprints at the water’s edge. The tracks had been lore among old timers. The tracks were likely formed in the late 19th and early 20th centuries. Old coins have also been found near the tracks. The tracks are seen after winter storms, and then within a few days are covered again.

Anne McCaffrey's novel The Mark of Merln is set in a home on the imaginary "Pull-In Point Road", overlooking Nauset Beach.
