= George R. Tolman =

- Born: December 5, 1848; Boston, Massachusetts, U.S.
- Died: After 1930; Boston, Massachusetts, U.S.
- Spouse: Eva Francis (m. 1888)

George Russell Tolman (December 5, 1848 – after 1930) was an American architect and artist, known for his illustrations, who was active in the late 19th and early 20th centuries.

== Early life ==
Tolman was born in Boston in 1848 to Joseph and Elizabeth. In 1870, he was living with his sister's Ulman family, along with his father and brother. He was working as a draftsman.

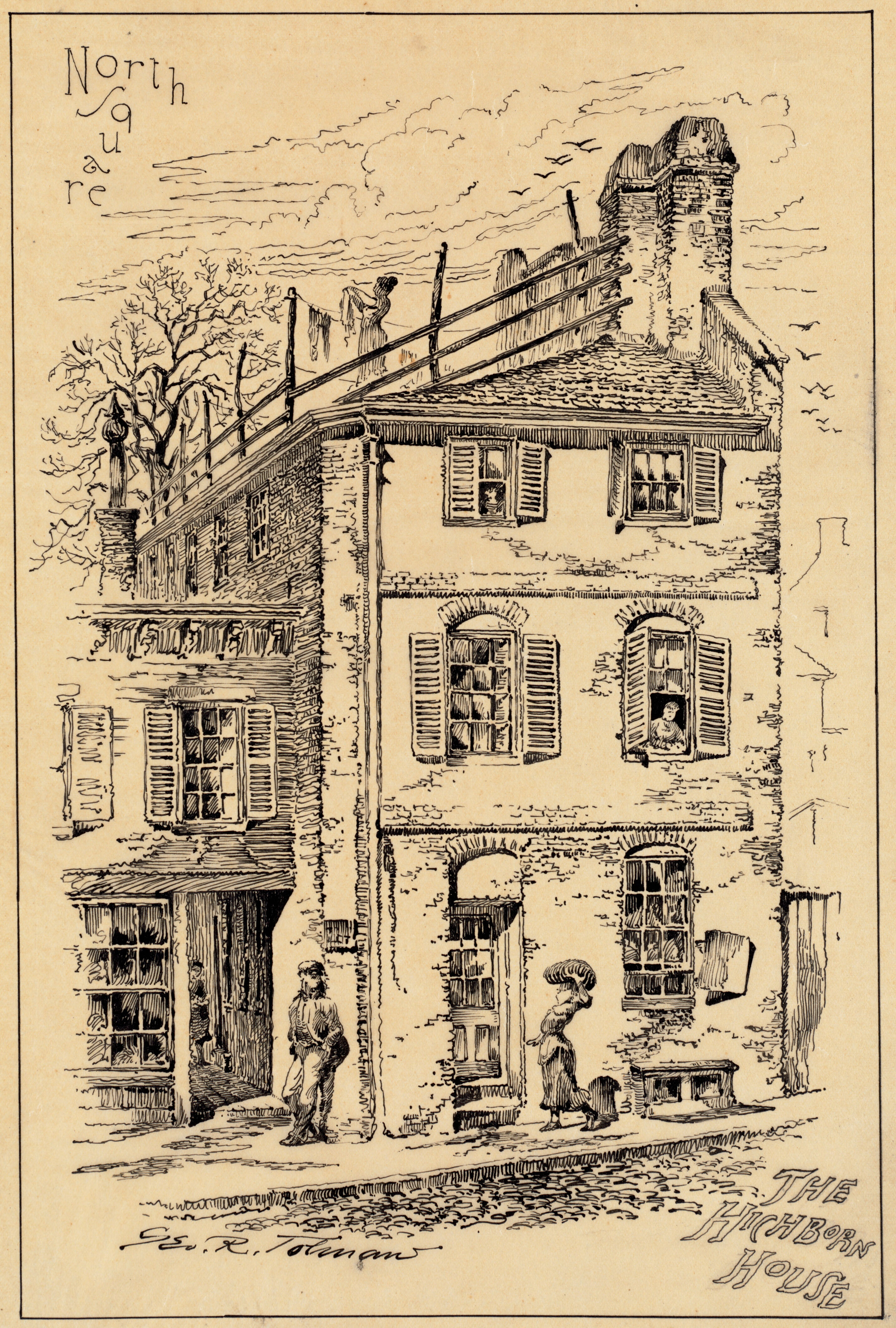
Tolman's sketch of the Pierce-Hichborn House in Boston (1887)

== Career ==
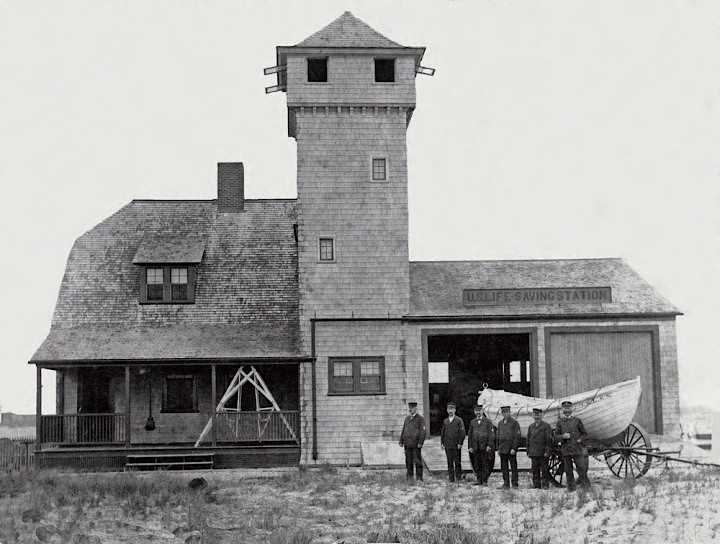
Old Harbor Life-Saving Station, Chatham, Massachusetts, one of Tolman's designs

In 1880, Tolman was listed as being an architect with the United States Treasury. He designed the Marine Barracks for the Norfolk Naval Shipyard in Norfolk, Virginia, in 1889. He was living in Washington, D.C., around this time.

Tolman replaced Albert Bibb as the architect for the U.S. Life-Saving Service in the new year of 1891. He designed a life-saving station for Quonochontaug, Rhode Island. A modified plan of the building was included in the U.S. Government's exhibit at the 1893 World's Fair in Chicago.

In 1902, Tolman was working in Richmond, Virginia. His survey of a site in Clifton, Virginia, was included in a 1904 edition of American Architect and Building News.

Tolman became an instructor at the Massachusetts Institute of Technology. One of his students was future architect W. Duncan Lee.

== Personal life ==
In 1887, Tolman was arrested for allegedly embezzling drawings from Captain Phelps, one of his clients. He filed a lawsuit against Phelps, who, he claimed, owed him money. He also sued for wrongful imprisonment. He was successful in both instances.

Tolman married Eva Frances in October 1888. The following spring, Tolman (possibly on his own) relocated to Kittery, Maine, and began working as a draftsman at the Portsmouth Naval Shipyard. His wife sued him for alimony in 1892, which he appealed the following year, denying he was the father of her deceased child. A trial forced him to pay alimony; he refused, and was taken into custody. In the summer of 1896, Tolman left his role with the Life-Saving Service for personal reasons ("taking a sudden and unapproved leave of absence to escape a warrant for his recommitment to jail"). He was believed to have relocated to Wayne, Indiana, where he was listed in the 1900 U.S. Census.

In 1930, an 82-year-old Tolman was living with Ulman nieces and nephews in Plymouth, Massachusetts.

== Death ==
Tolman died in Boston sometime after 1930.

== Bibliography ==
- Entrance to Old Seton House (1879)
- 12 Sketches of Old Boston Buildings (1882)
- Rambles in Old Boston, New England (1887)
