= Second Church of Dorchester =

Church

Coordinates: 42.290784°N 71.070865°W

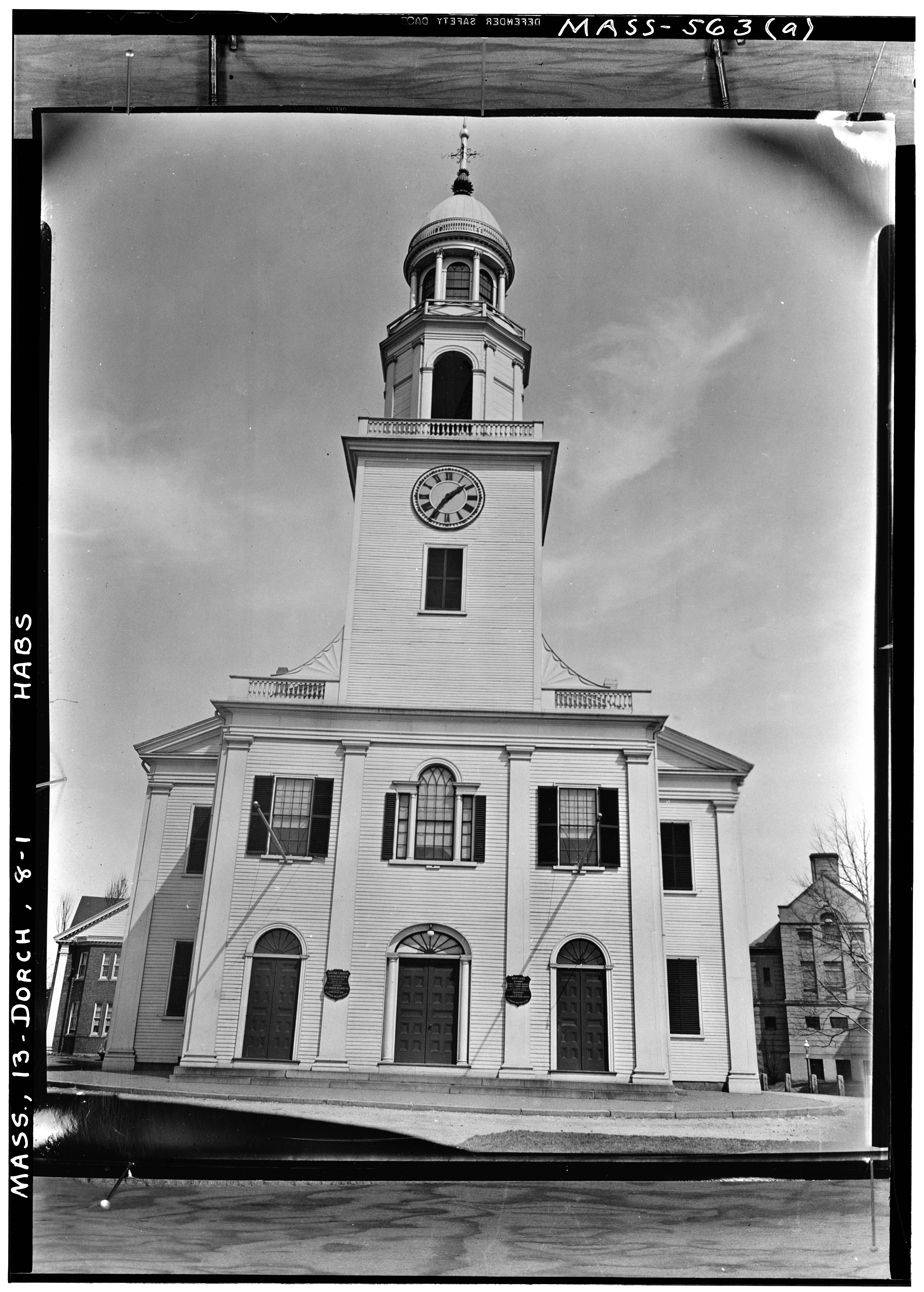
Second Church, Washington and Center Streets, Dorchester in 1941

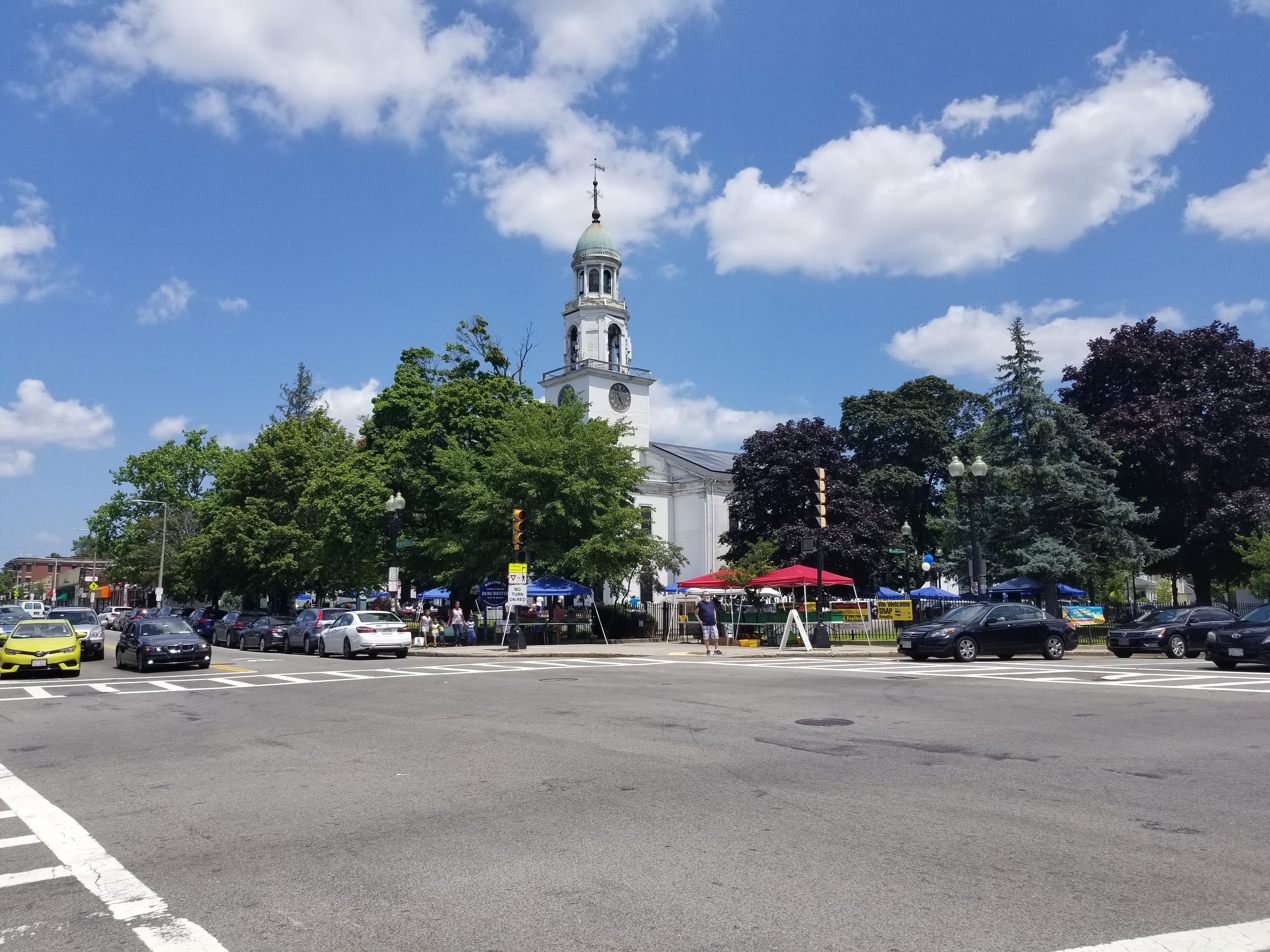
Second Church in Dorchester in July 2019

Second Church of Dorchester is a Church of the Nazarene in the historic Codman Square District of Dorchester in Boston, Massachusetts. In 1804 the church was founded as the Dorchester Meeting House Company by members from the First Parish Church of Dorchester.

In 1806, the Harvard graduate John Codman was ordained as the church´s first minister. Notable attendees during Dr. Codman´s ministry tenure included John Adams and Daniel Webster. Paul Revere & Sons cast the bell for the church tower. Colonel William Baker donated the clock for the church tower. The church also houses a pipe organ. The church was originally Congregational but became a Church of the Nazarene in 1991.
