= The Literary World (Boston) =

Former literary magazine

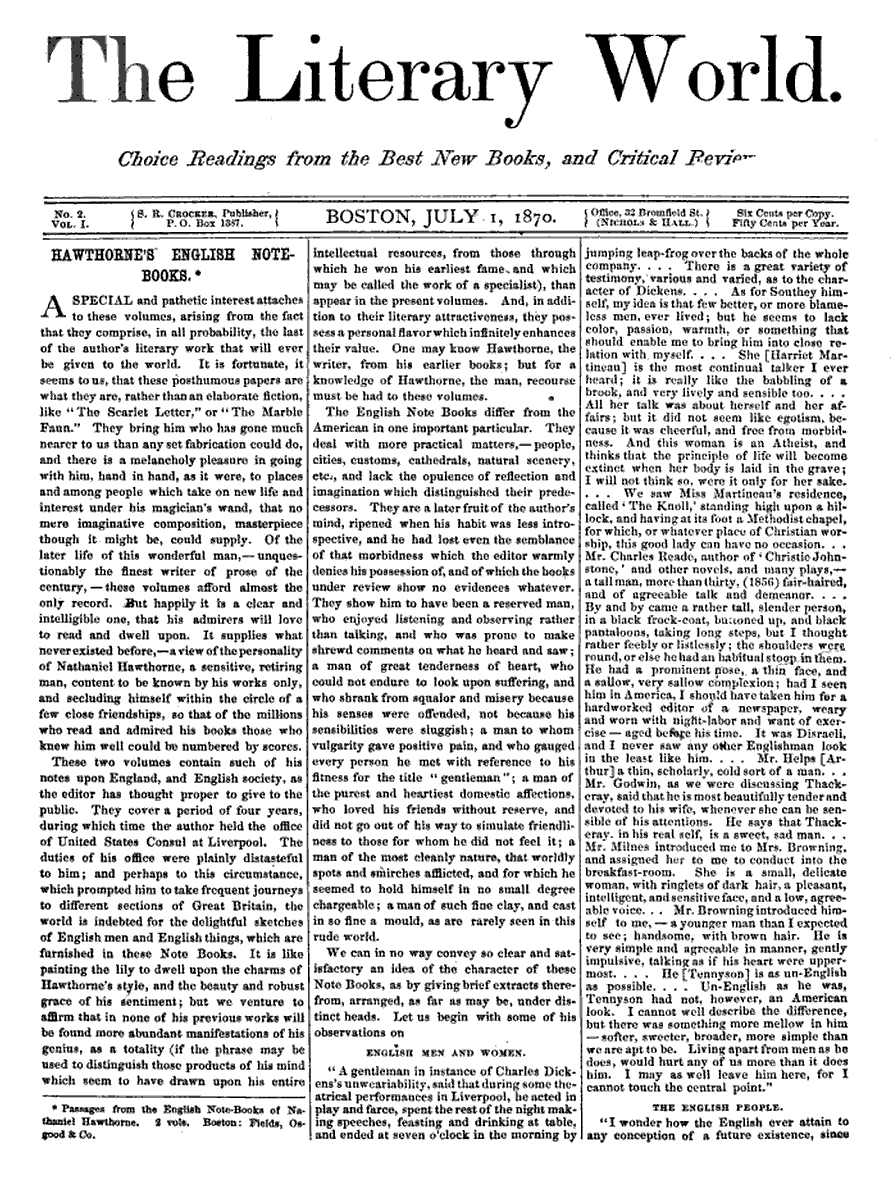
The Literary World, Vol. I, No. 2, 1 July 1870

The Literary World was a magazine of literary criticism, published from Boston by S. R. Crocker, which offered "choice readings from the best new books, and critical reviews". An edition was also published from London. The magazine was first published in June 1870 and continued until 1904, when it was incorporated into The Critic.

== See also ==
- The Literary World, New York, 1847–53.
