= Province House (Boston, Massachusetts) =

Building in Massachusetts, US (1679–1864)

Coordinates: 42°21′25.68″N 71°3′35.42″W

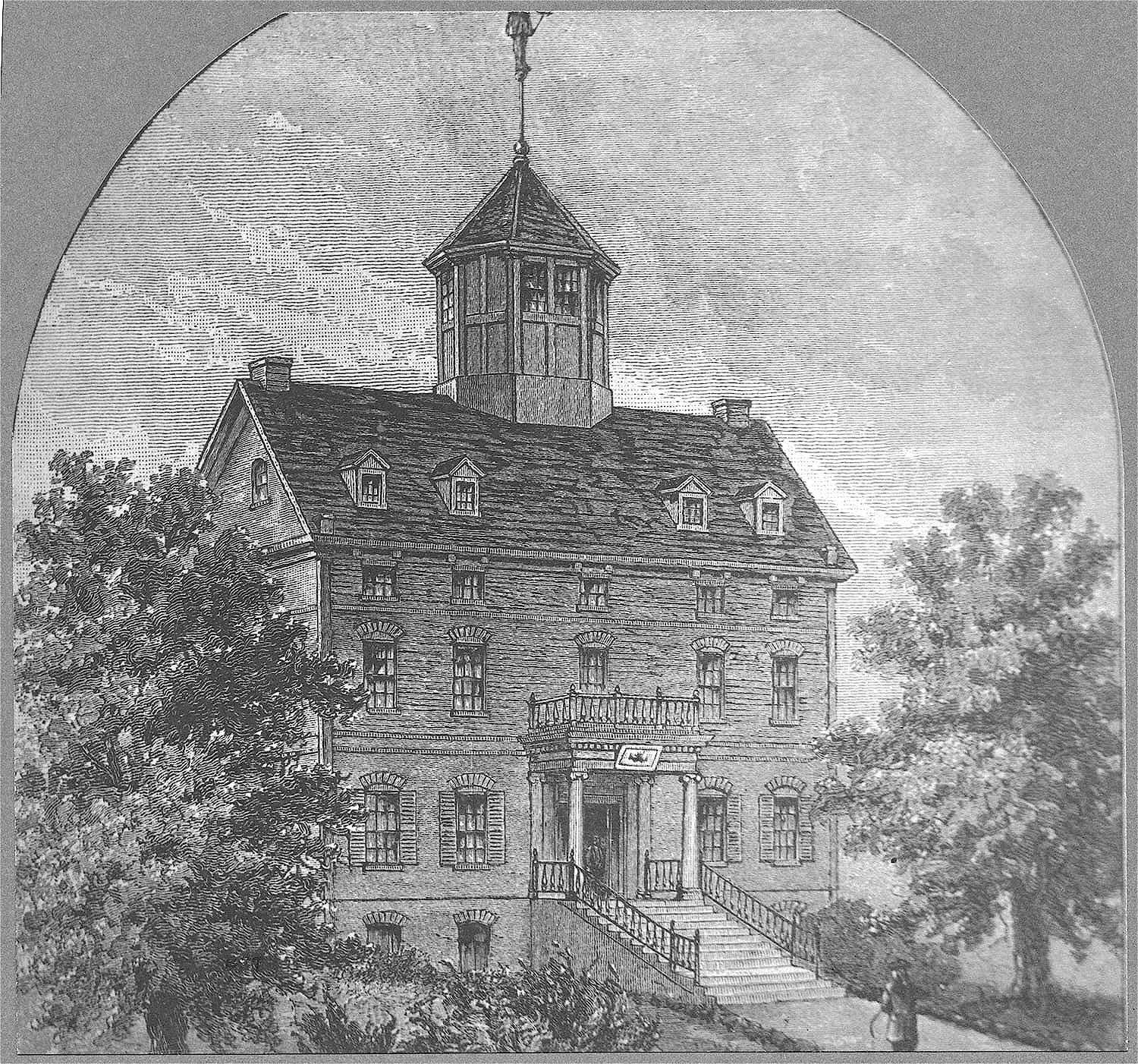
Province House, Boston

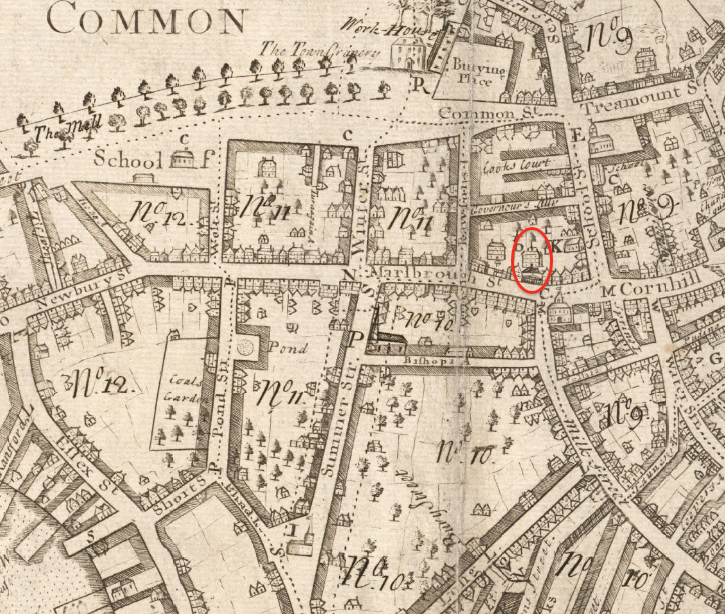
Area of Province House in Boston; detail of 1743 map

The Province House (1679–1864) was a mansion on old Marlborough Street in Boston, Massachusetts. Built in 1679, it was the home of merchant Peter Sergeant, and after 1716, the official residence of royal governors of the Province of Massachusetts Bay. Known for its great main staircase and original Tudor-style chimney stacks, the building fell into disrepair in the 19th century, partially burned in 1864, and was demolished in 1922.

It has been considered one of the grandest examples of New England colonial architecture. However, only artist drawings of its outside elevation exist today, as well as photographs of its demolition in 1922. The 18th-century artist rendering shown here depicts the residence after the chimney stacks and ornate gables had been removed, in the earlier part of that century. A portion of the stone steps leading from the present street to the former garden remain.

== See also ==
- Ordway Hall (Boston) (1852 – ca. 1864) in the re-purposed Province House building
