= Hancock House =

Hancock House may refer to:

in the United States (by state then city)

- Charles T. Hancock House, Dubuque, Iowa, listed on the National Register of Historic Places listings in Dubuque County, Iowa
- Hancock House (Bedford, Kentucky), listed on the National Register of Historic Places listings in Trimble County, Kentucky
- John Hancock Warehouse, York, Maine, listed on the National Register of Historic Places in York County, Maine
- Hancock's Resolution, Pasadena, Maryland, listed on the NRHP in Anne Arundel County, Maryland
- Hancock Manor, a former house on Beacon Hill in Boston, Massachusetts, also known as Hancock House
- Hancock–Clarke House, Lexington, Massachusetts, listed on the NRHP in Middlesex County, Massachusetts
- Rev. John Hancock House, Cider Mill and Cemetery, Florham Park, New Jersey, listed on the National Register of Historic Places listings in Morris County, New Jersey
- Hancock House (Lower Alloways Creek Township, New Jersey), listed on the National Register of Historic Places in Salem County, New Jersey
- Hancock House (Ticonderoga, New York), listed on the National Register of Historic Places in Essex County, New York
- Ward-Hancock House, Beaufort, North Carolina
- John Hancock House, Austin, Texas, listed on the National Register of Historic Places listings in Travis County, Texas
- Moore-Hancock Farmstead, Austin, Texas, listed on the National Register of Historic Places listings in Travis County, Texas
- Mills-Hancock House, Centerville, Utah, listed on the National Register of Historic Places listings in Davis County, Utah
- Hancock–Wirt–Caskie House, Richmond, Virginia, listed on the National Register of Historic Places listings in Richmond, Virginia
- Hancock House (Bluefield, West Virginia), listed on the National Register of Historic Places in Mercer County, West Virginia
