= Fenimore Art Museum =

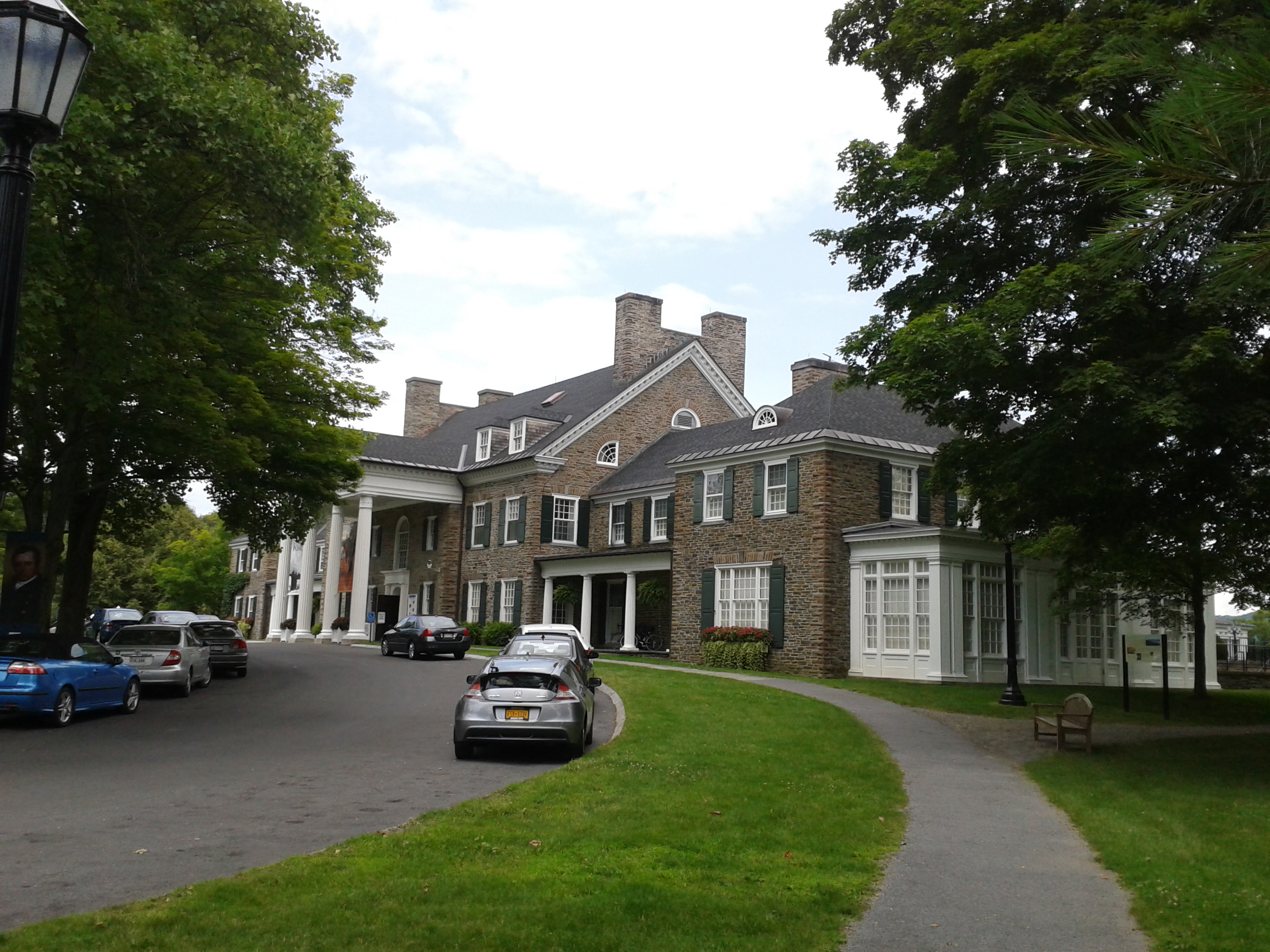
- The Fenimore Art Museum building, seen in July 2014
- Established: 1899; 127 years ago
- Location: Otsego, New York
- Coordinates: 42°42′56.4″N 074°55′37″W
- Type: Art museum
- President: Paul D'Ambrosio
- Website: www.fenimoreartmuseum.org

The Fenimore Art Museum (formerly known as New York State Historical Association) is a museum located in Otsego, New York on the west side of Otsego Lake, near Cooperstown. Collection strengths include the Eugene and Clare Thaw Collection of American Indian Art, American fine and folk art, 19th and early 20th century photography, as well as rare books and manuscripts. The museum's mission is to connect its audience to American and New York State cultural heritage by organizing exhibits and public programs that "engage, delight and inspire."

The house organ was titled Heritage.

The Fenimore Art Museum is closely associated with The Fenimore Farm & Country Village, also in Cooperstown.

== History ==
Fenimore Art Museum was founded in 1899 as the New York State Historical Association. In 1925–1926, industrialist Horace Moses built a replica of the Thomas Hancock House in Boston in Ticonderoga, New York to serve as the home of the New York State Historical Association.

In 1939, Stephen Carlton Clark, an art collector interested in history, who also served on the board of the Museum of Modern Art and the Metropolitan Museum, invited NYSHA to move to Fenimore House, the mansion of his late brother Edward Severin Clark on land that was part of James Fenimore Cooper's former farm just outside Cooperstown. For some years, the association operated headquarters in both Ticonderoga and Cooperstown. Eventually, operations were consolidated in Cooperstown. Hancock House became the home of the Ticonderoga Historical Society, while NYSHA retained ownership of the building and some furnishings.

In the mid-1990s, a new wing was added to Fenimore House for the Eugene and Clare Thaw Collection of American Indian Art. Fenimore House was subsequently renamed Fenimore Art Museum.

Having operated under a dba as Fenimore Art Museum since the 1990s, and in an effort to better describe its wide-ranging activities, the organization applied to amend its charter and change its corporate name in 2017. As such, the New York State Board of Regents approved the updated charter on March 10, 2017, formally changing the organization's name from New York State Historical Association to Fenimore Art Museum.

== Collections ==
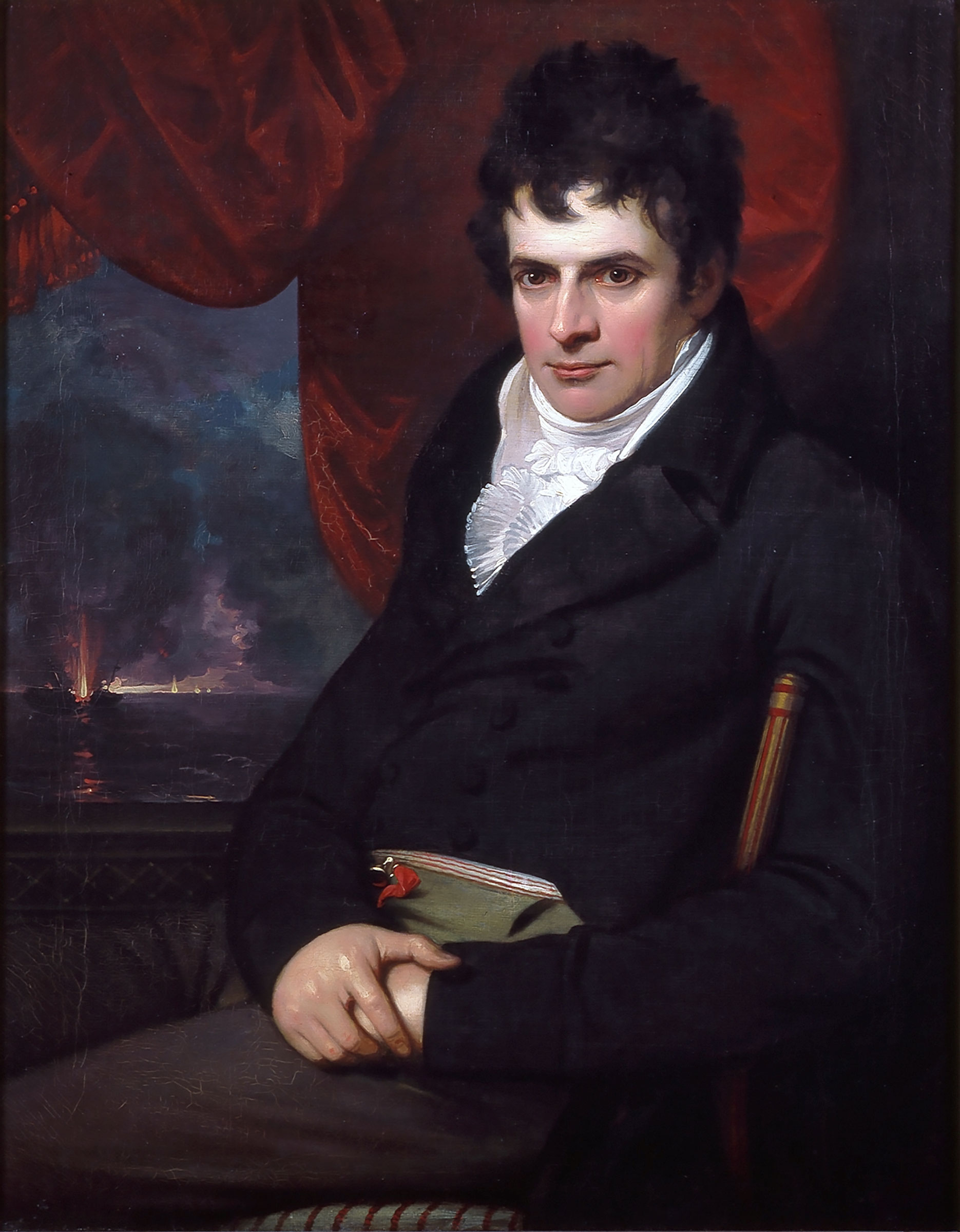
Portrait of Robert Fulton by Benjamin West, 1806

=== Fine Art & Folk Art ===
The fine art and folk art collections were largely assembled by Stephen C. Clark and include works by Gilbert Stuart, Thomas Cole, William Sidney Mount, Benjamin West, Grandma Moses, Ralph Fasanella, and Lavern Kelley.

=== Thaw Collection of American Indian Art ===
Clare and Eugene Thaw donated their collection of indigenous American art to the Fenimore Art Museum in 1991. Items are continually added to the collection, which currently comprises more than 850 objects.

=== Photography ===
Fenimore Art Museum's photography collections feature a number of Cooperstown artists, the most well-known being the Smith & Telfer Collection. A portion of the firm's 60,000 piece archive has been digitized and is available online.

=== Research library ===
In 1968, a separate building was built to consolidate the library collections of both New York State Historical Association (as it was known at the time) and The Farmers' Museum. The Research Library supplements the missions and collections of both organizations by supporting research in local history, 19th century trades and agriculture, as well as art and material culture of Otsego County and surrounding areas of New York State. Records of the John More Association are held in this collection.

== Performing arts ==
Since 2015 the museum has hosted outdoor theatrical productions in the Lucy B. Hamilton Amphitheater, located on the grounds overlooking Otsego Lake.
