= West Eleventh Street Historic District =

West Eleventh Street Historic District may refer to:

- West Eleventh Street Historic District (Dubuque, Iowa), listed on the National Register of Historic Places in Dubuque County, Iowa
- West Eleventh Street Historic District (Kansas City, Missouri), listed on the National Register of Historic Places in Jackson County, Missouri
