= Portrait of Robert Fulton =

Painting by Benjamin West

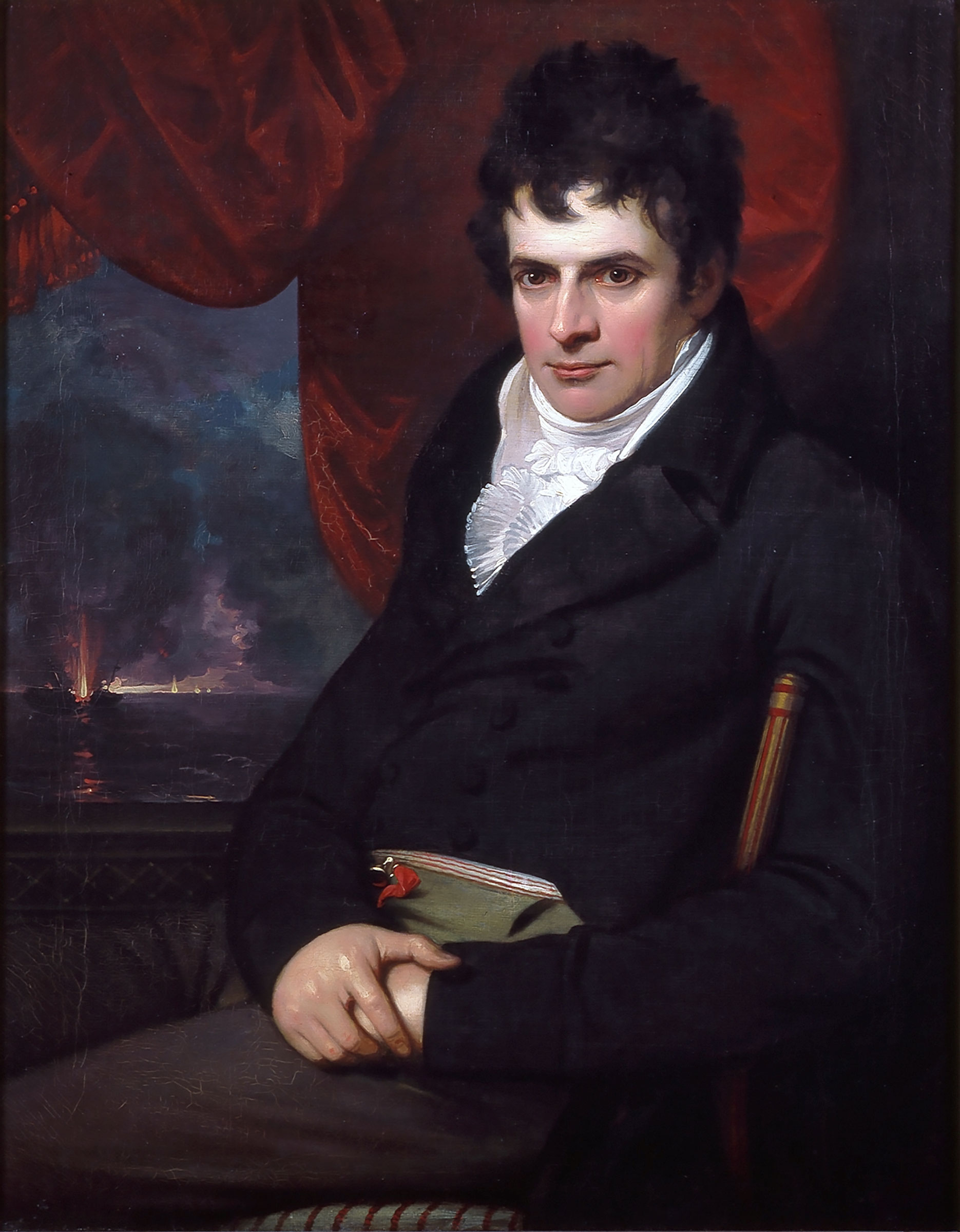
- Artist: Benjamin West
- Year: 1806
- Type: Oil on canvas, portrait
- Dimensions: 92.08 cm × 71.76 cm (36.25 in × 28.25 in)
- Location: Fenimore Art Museum; Cooperstown, New York

Portrait of Robert Fulton is an 1806 portrait painting by the Anglo-American artist Benjamin West depicting the American inventor Robert Fulton.

West was an American-born artist who had emigrated to London, where he enjoyed success with his history paintings and portraits. Succeeding Joshua Reynolds, he was the second president of the Royal Academy from 1792. His career in Britain began before the American War of Independence and lasted into the Regency era.

Fulton was an American engineer who is best known for his development of North River Steamboat which ran on the Hudson River and is considered the first commercially successful steamboat in the world. He was in London and on friendly terms with West when he was painted. Today it is in the collection of the Fenimore Art Museum in Cooperstown, New York.

== Bibliography ==
- Evans, Dorinda. Benjamin West and His American Students. National Portrait Gallery, 1980.
- Jones, Louis Clark. Cooperstown. Otsego County Historical Society, 1953.
- St. George, Robert Blair. Possible Pasts: Becoming Colonial in Early America. Cornell University Press, 2018.
