= North River Steamboat =

Steam-powered ferry which operated on the Hudson River from 1807 to 1814

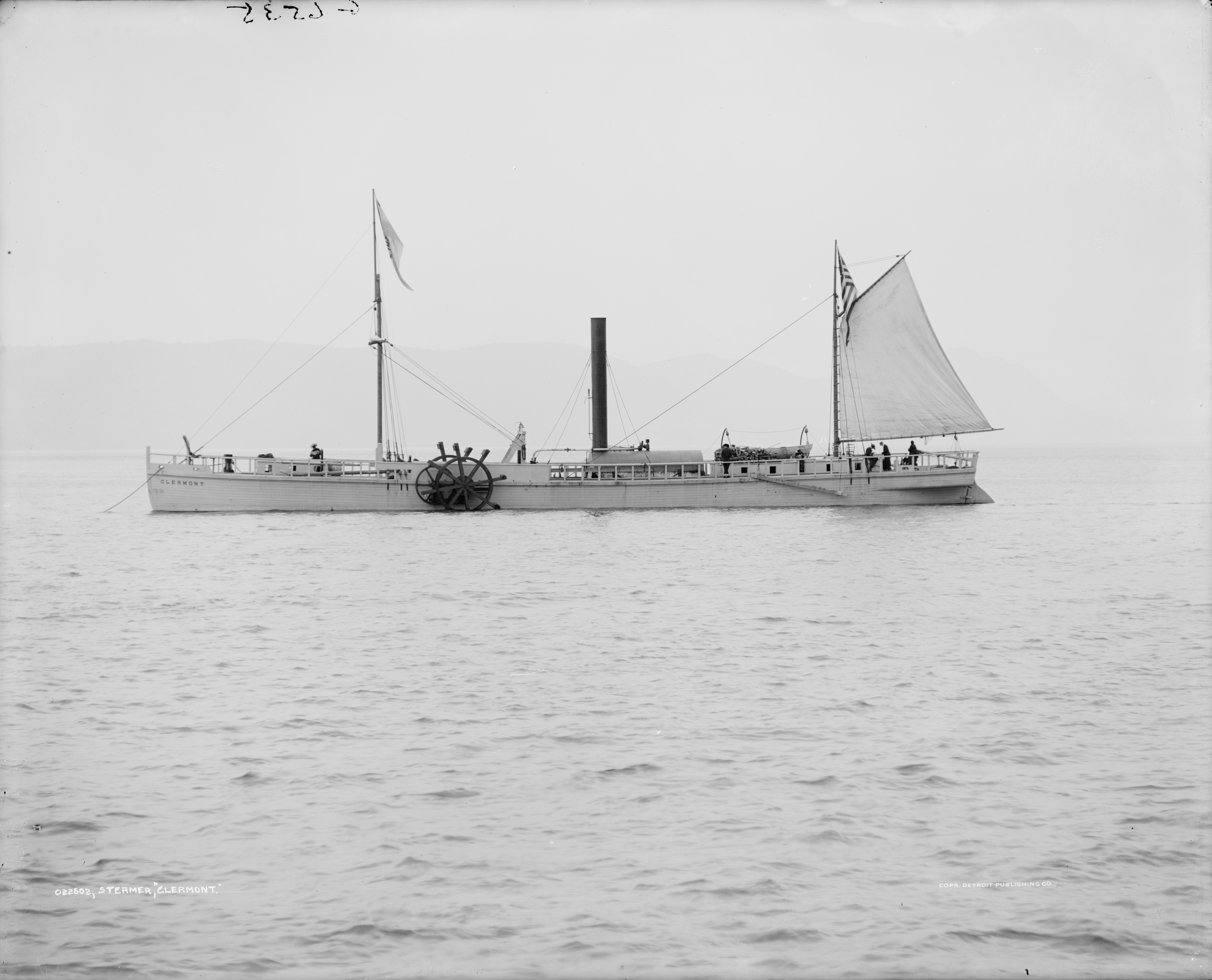
- The 1909 replica of the North River Steamboat (Clermont) at anchor

History

United States
- Name: North River Steamboat
- Owner: Robert Livingston and Robert Fulton
- Builder: Charles Browne
- Completed: 1807
- In service: August 17, 1807
- Out of service: 1814
- Renamed: North River
- Nickname(s): Clermont; Fulton Folly
- Fate: Scrapped

General characteristics
- Length: 142 ft (43 m)
- Beam: 18 ft (5.5 m)
- Height: 62 ft (19 m)
- Draught: 7 ft (2.1 m)
- Installed power: Steam, 19 h.p.
- Propulsion: Paddle wheel and Sail
- Speed: 4.3 kn (4.9 mph)

The North River Steamboat or North River, colloquially known as the Clermont, is widely regarded as the world's first vessel to demonstrate the viability of using steam propulsion for commercial water transportation. Built in 1807, the North River Steamboat operated on the Hudson River – at that time often known as the North River – between New York City and Albany, New York. She was built by the wealthy investor and politician Robert Livingston and inventor and entrepreneur Robert Fulton (1765–1815).

== Background ==
Livingston had obtained from the New York legislature the exclusive right to steam navigation on the Hudson River. In 1803, while Livingston was Minister to France, Fulton's company built a small steamboat and tested it on the Seine. With this success, Livingston then contracted with Fulton to take advantage of his Hudson River monopoly and build a larger version for commercial service.

Their larger steamer was built at the Charles Browne shipyard in New York and was fitted with Fulton's innovative steam engine design, manufactured for Livingston and Fulton by Boulton and Watt in Birmingham, England. Before she was later widened, the vessel's original dimensions were 150 feet (46 m) long × 12 feet (3.7 m) wide × 7 feet (2.1 m) deep; she drew a little more than 2 feet (60 cm) of water when launched. The steamer was equipped with two paddle wheels, one each to a side; each paddle wheel assembly was equipped with two sets of eight spokes. She also carried two masts with spars, rigging, and sails, likely a foremast with a square sail and a mizzen mast with fore-and-aft sail (spanker), with the steam engine placed amidships, directly behind the paddle wheel's drive gear machinery.

== Fulton's descriptions of his steamboat ==
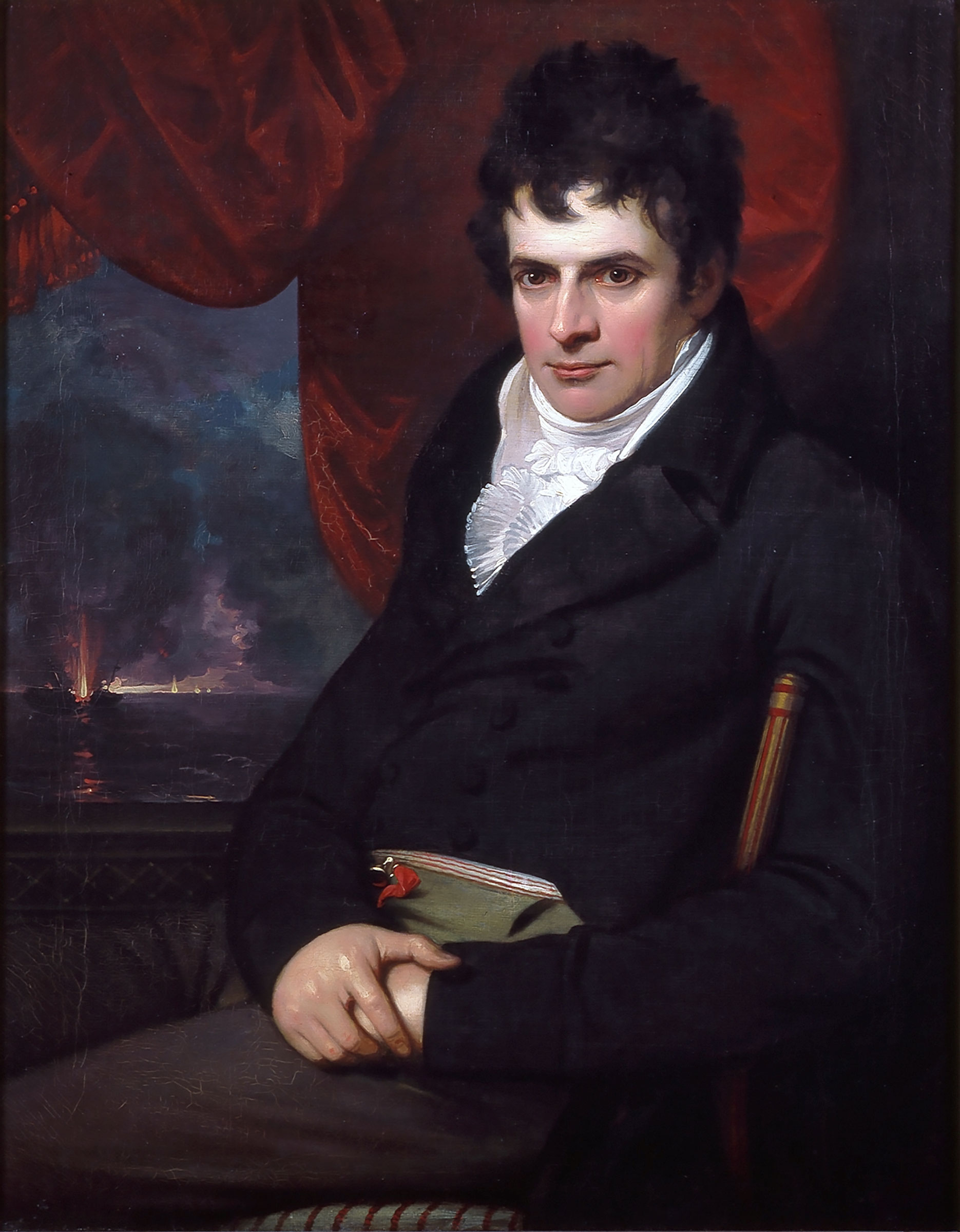
Portrait of Robert Fulton by Benjamin West, 1806

"My first steamboat on the Hudson's River was 150 feet long, 13 feet wide, drawing 2 ft. of water, bow and stern 60 degrees: she displaced 36.40 [sic] cubic feet, equal 100 tons of water; her bow presented 26 ft. to the water, plus and minus the resistance of 1 ft. running 4 miles an hour."

Fulton's published specifications after Steamboat's widening and general rebuild:

- Length: 142 feet (43 m)
- Maximum width: 18 feet (5.5 m)
- Maximum height: 62 feet (19 m)
- Depth: 7 feet (2.1 m)
- Displacement: 121 tons
- Average speed: 4.7 miles per hour
- Time saved: 150 miles in 32 hours

The paddle wheels were 4 feet (1.2 m) wide and 15 feet (4.6 m) in diameter.

In the Nautical Gazette the editor, Mr. Samuel Ward Stanton, gives the following additional details:

The bottom of the boat was formed of yellow pine plank 1.5 in. thick, tongued and grooved, and set together with white lead. This bottom or platform was laid in a transverse platform and molded out with batten and nails. The shape of the bottom being thus formed, the floors of oak and spruce were placed across the bottom; the spruce floors being 4×8 inches and 2 feet apart. The oak floors were reserved for the ends, and were both sided and molded 8 inches. Her top timbers (which were of spruce and extended from a log that formed the bridge to the deck) were sided 6 inches and molded at heel, and both sided and molded 4 inches at the head. She had no guards when first built and was steered by a tiller. Her draft of water was 28 inches.

The boat had three cabins with 54 berths, a kitchen, larder, pantry, bar, and steward's room.

== First voyage ==
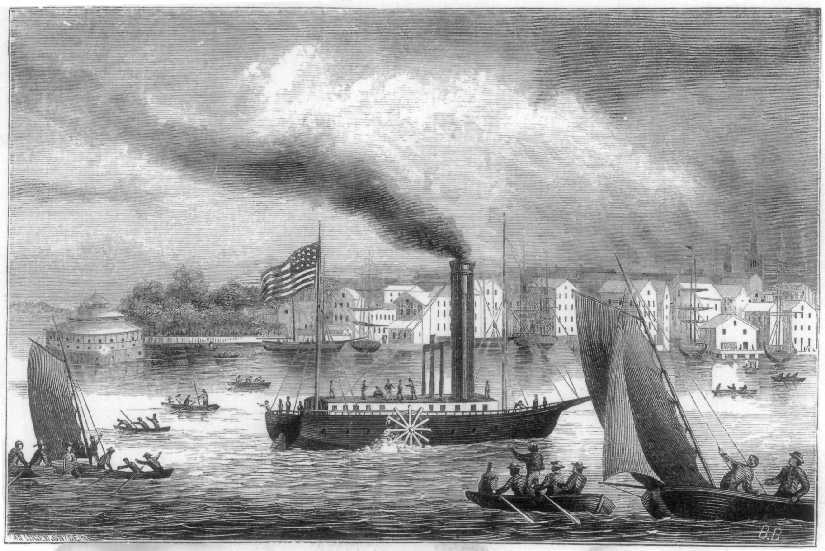
Illustration from an 1870 book

The steamer's inaugural run was helmed by Captain Andrew Brink, and left New York on August 17, 1807, with a complement of guests aboard. They arrived in Albany two days later, after 32 hours of travel time and a 20-hour stop at Livingston's estate, Clermont Manor. The return trip was completed in 30 hours with only a one-hour stop at Clermont; the average speed of the steamer was 5 mph (8 km/h).

Fulton wrote to a friend, Joel Barlow:

I had a light breeze against me the whole way, both going and coming, and the voyage has been performed wholly by the power of the steam engine. I overtook many sloops and schooners, beating to the windward, and parted with them as if they had been at anchor. The power of propelling boats by steam is now fully proved. The morning I left New York, there were not perhaps thirty persons in the city who believed that the boat would ever move one mile an hour, or be of the least utility, and while we were putting off from the wharf, which was crowded with spectators, I heard a number of sarcastic remarks. This is the way in which ignorant men compliment what they call philosophers and projectors. Having employed much time, money and zeal in accomplishing this work, it gives me, as it will you, great pleasure to see it fully answer my expectations.

The 1870 book Great Fortunes quotes a former resident of Poughkeepsie who described the scene:

It was in the early autumn of the year 1807 that a knot of villagers was gathered on a high bluff just opposite Poughkeepsie, on the west bank of the Hudson, attracted by the appearance of a strange, dark-looking craft, which was slowly making its way up the river. Some imagined it to be a sea-monster, while others did not hesitate to express their belief that it was a sign of the approaching judgment. What seemed strange in the vessel was the substitution of lofty and straight black smoke-pipes, rising from the deck, instead of the gracefully tapered masts that commonly stood on the vessels navigating the stream, and, in place of the spars and rigging, the curious play of the working-beam and pistons, and the slow turning and splashing of the huge and naked paddle-wheels, met the astonished gaze. The dense clouds of smoke, as they rose wave upon wave, added still more to the wonderment of the rustics.

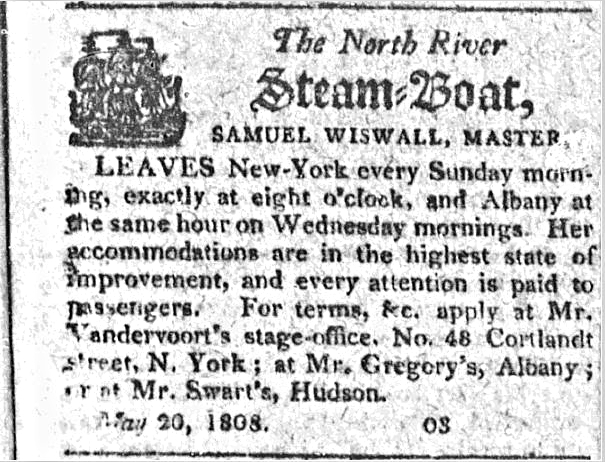
Advertisement for the North River Steamboat in 1808

Scheduled passenger service began on September 4, 1807. Steamboat left New York on Saturdays at 6:00 pm, and returned from Albany on Wednesdays at 8:00 am, taking about 36 hours for each journey. Stops were made at West Point, Newburgh, Poughkeepsie, Esopus, and Hudson; other stops were sometimes made, such as Red Hook and Catskill. In the company's publicity the ship was called North River Steamboat or just Steamboat (there being no other in operation at the time).

== Enrollment and rebuilding ==
The steamer's original 1807 federal government enrollment (registration) was lost, but because the vessel was rebuilt during the winter of 1807-1808, she had to be enrolled again. The second document lists the owners as Livingston and Fulton, and the ship's name as North River Steamboat of Clermont.

The rebuilding of the ship was substantial: she was widened by six feet to increase navigation stability, and her simple stern tiller steering was moved forward and changed to a ship's wheel, steering ropes, and rudder system. A poop deck and other topside additions were made or rebuilt entirely. Her exposed mid-ships engine compartment had an overhead weather deck/roof added to increase the topside deck area. Anticipating future passenger requirements, her twin paddle wheels were enclosed above the waterline to quiet their loud splashing noise, reducing heavy river mist, while also preventing floating debris from being kicked up into the vessel's mid-hull area. Later, the ship's long name was shortened to North River.

== Subsequent events ==
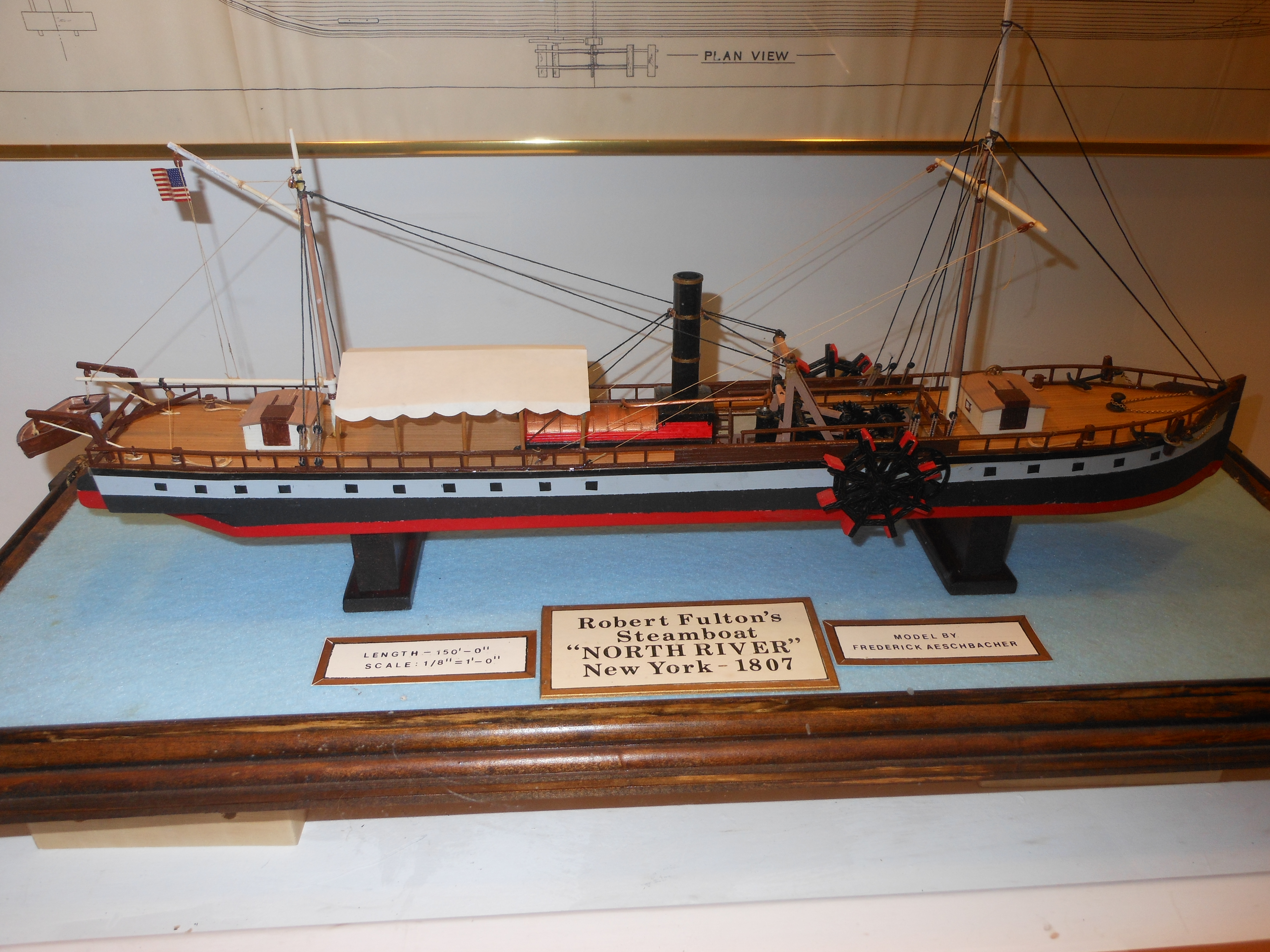
Model of the North River Steamboat at the Hudson River Maritime Museum

In its first year the new steamer differentiated herself from all of her predecessors by turning a tidy profit. The quick commercial success of North River Steamboat led Livingston and Fulton to commission in 1809 a second, very similar steamboat, Car of Neptune, followed in 1811 by Paragon. An advertisement for the passenger service in 1812 lists the three boats' schedules, using the name North River for the firm's first vessel. The North River was retired in 1814; some further speculation says that she remained in service until the end of the Fulton-Livingston monopoly in 1824, and her ultimate fate remains unknown. By the time Fulton died in 1815, he had built a total of seventeen steamboats, and a half-dozen more were constructed by other ship builders using his plans.

Livingston died in 1813 and passed his shares of the steamboat company on to his sons-in-law. With Fulton’s death two years later, the original power behind the partnership dissolved. This left the company with its monopoly in New York waters prey to other ambitious American businessmen. Livingston's heirs later granted an exclusive license to Aaron Ogden to run a ferry between New York and New Jersey, while Thomas Gibbons and Cornelius Vanderbilt established a competing service. The Livingston Fulton monopoly was dissolved in 1824 following the landmark Gibbons v. Ogden Supreme Court case, opening New York waters to all competitive steam navigation companies. In 1819 there were only nine steamboats in operation on the Hudson River; by 1840, customers could choose from more than 100 in service.

== Known as Clermont ==
The misnomer Clermont first appeared in Cadwallader D. Colden's biography of Fulton, published in 1817, two years after Fulton's death. Since Colden was a friend of both Fulton and Livingston, his book was considered an authoritative source, and his errors were perpetuated in later accounts up to the present day. The vessel is now nearly always referred to as Clermont, but no contemporary account called her by that name.

== 1909 Clermont replica ==
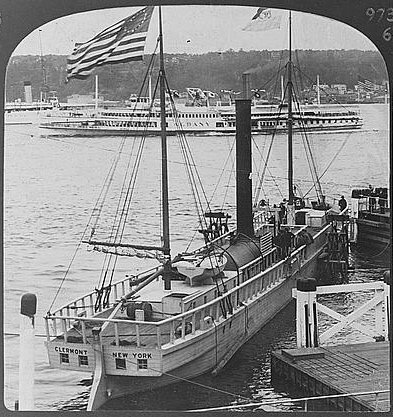
Clermont replica in New York harbor, 1910

A full-sized, 150-foot long by 16-foot wide steam-powered replica, named Clermont, was built for the 1909 Hudson-Fulton Celebration in New York, by the Staten Island Shipbuilding Company at the Mariners' harbor yards. The replica's design and final appearance was decided by an appointed commission who carefully researched Fulton's steamer from what evidence and word-of-mouth had survived to the early 20th century. Their replica was launched at Mariner's Island, S.I. with great fanfare on July 10, 1909, at Staten Island, New York. Her US Official Number (O.N.) was 206719. The water used to christen her came from the same well Fulton drank from, at Livingston Place, Clermont, New York. Her ship's bell, from the original Clermont, was borrowed from the Hudson River Day Line's riverboat Robert Fulton (1909).

She started sea trials along the Staten Island and Jersey shores on September 3, 1909, and proved to be faster than the Fulton's original, making about 6 miles an hour against the tide in the bay. Her paddle wheels turned at 20 revolutions per minute. Clairmont continued being made ready for her place in the opening day's parade on September 25. She was to be seen in the parade with a replica of the Henry Hudson's ship Half Moon, brought from Rotterdam to New York that July by the Holland America Line vessel SS Soestdyk.

In 1910, following the large celebration, Clermont was sold by her owners, the Hudson-Fulton Celebration Commission, to defray their losses; she was purchased by the Hudson River Day Line and served the company as a moored river transportation museum at their two locations in New York harbor. In 1911 Clermont was moved to Poughkeepsie, New York and served Day Line as a New York state historic ship attraction. The company eventually lost interest in the steamboat as a money-making attraction and placed her in a tidal lagoon on the inner side of their landing at Kingston Point, New York. For many years Day Line kept Clermont in presentable condition, but as their business and profits slowed during the Great Depression, they voted to stop maintaining her; Clermont was eventually broken up for scrap in 1936, 27 years after her launching.

== In popular culture ==
After the 1923 homonymous silent film, starring Marion Davies, came Little Old New York (1940), the sound version of the historical film drama from 20th Century Fox, based on Robert Fulton's venture to build the North River Steamboat (aka Clermont in the film). Both a 12-foot shooting miniature and a full size mock-up of the steamboat were built for the Fox production; both were based on the original full sized 1909 Clermont reproduction that had been broken up several years before. The film, based on the play by Rida Johnson Young, was directed by Henry King, produced by Darryl F. Zanuck, and stars Alice Faye, Fred MacMurray, and Richard Greene.

On the Beach Boys' album Holland (1973), Fulton's steamer is featured in Dennis Wilson's song, "Steamboat."

== See also ==
- Daniel French
- Experiment (horse-powered boat)
