= Junior Achievement =

American non-profit youth organization

JA Worldwide
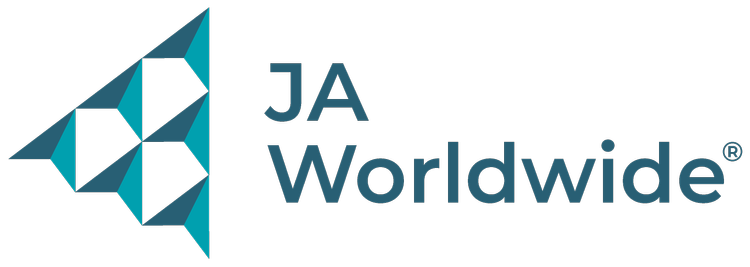
- Founded: 1919; 107 years ago
- Founders: Theodore Vail; Horace A. Moses; Winthrop M. Crane
- Type: International NGO
- Legal status: 501(c)(3)
- Purpose: Youth programs in work readiness, financial literacy, and entrepreneurship
- Headquarters: Boston, Massachusetts, U.S.
- Region served: Over 100 countries
- Key people: Asheesh Advani (President and CEO); Jonas Prising (Board chair)
- Revenue: US$22.1 million (FY2024)
- Expenses: US$22.1 million (FY2024)
- Website: jaworldwide.org

JA (Junior Achievement) Worldwide is American-based coordinating body of the Junior Achievement network, a non-profit youth organization founded in 1919 by Horace A. Moses, Theodore Vail, and Winthrop M. Crane. It supports member organizations that deliver classroom and experiential programs in work readiness, financial literacy, and entrepreneurship. As of 2024, the network operates in more than 100 countries and reaches roughly ten million students annually, according to the World Economic Forum.

== History ==
The organization began in 1919 in Springfield, Massachusetts, as the Boys' and Girls' Bureau of the Eastern States, a spinoff of the Eastern States Exposition. It was renamed the Junior Achievement Bureau in 1920 and incorporated as Junior Achievement, Inc. in 1926.

Beginning in 1944, Junior Achievement organized an annual national conference, known as the National Junior Achievers Conference, NAJAC, to bring together student representatives of local programs to participate in contests. In 1949, the organization began allowing conference delegates to elect national leadership to play an active role contributing to program development, increasing public awareness and supporting fundraising.

Following the Second World War, Junior Achievement expanded from a regional to a national presence in the United States and later grew internationally in the 1960s.

In 1975, Junior Achievement introduced its first in-school program, Project Business, to help volunteers teach local middle school students about business and personal finance.

== Programs ==
Member organizations deliver a portfolio of curricula and simulations that teach personal finance, entrepreneurship, and career exploration. Program models include facility-based experiences such as JA Finance Park and school-based company programs in which students start and run small enterprises under volunteer mentorship. Independent local reporting illustrates delivery at the school district level, with volunteers facilitating hands-on activities linked to state personal-finance requirements. In April 2025, ETS and UNICEF’s Generation Unlimited announced a partnership with JA Worldwide to measure and strengthen so-called durable skills through large-scale assessment and guidance tools.

== Structure and governance ==
JA Worldwide coordinates six regional operating centers: JA Africa, JA Americas, JA Asia Pacific, JA Europe, INJAZ Al-Arab (JA MENA), and Junior Achievement USA. The organization is headquartered in Boston, Massachusetts, and functions as a 501(c)(3) public charity in the United States.

From its founding in 1919 until 1962, JA was managed by volunteers from the business community. In 1962, the organization hired its first, full-time, paid president.

Asheesh Advani was appointed President and CEO in 2015. Jonas Prising, Chairman and CEO of ManpowerGroup, has served as Board Chair since 2021.

Prior to 2015, notable Board Chairs have included:

- 1919–1920: Theodore N. Vail, AT&T
- 1920–1942: Horace A. Moses, Strathmore Paper
- 1942–1944: Charles R. Hook, Armco Steel
- 1970–1971: John D. deButts, AT&T
- 1977–1979: Frank T. Cary, IBM
- 1979–1981: David T. Kearns, Xerox
- 1983–1985: John A. Young, Hewlett-Packard Co.
- 1987–1989: Lodwrick M. Cook, ARCO
- 2003–2006: Samuel DiPiazza, CEO, PwC; Juan Cintron, President, Consultores Internacionales (co-chairs)
- 2011–2015: Ralph de la Vega, President & CEO, AT&T Mobility

== Finances ==
JA Worldwide files annual IRS Form 990 in the United States. For the fiscal year ended June 2024, the organization reported revenue of US$22.1 million, expenses of US$22.1 million, and year-end assets of US$21.0 million. Charity evaluators publish accountability information based on these filings.

== In fiction ==
The July 1962 issue of Analog Science Fact & Fiction published a short story by William M. Lee called "Junior Achievement", about a JA group of gifted students who invent and sell products beyond the comprehension of their adult leader.

== See also ==
- INJAZ Al-Arab
- Entrepreneurship education
- Junior Enterprises Concept
