= Charles T. Hancock House =

Historic house in Iowa, United States

- U.S. National Register of Historic Places
- U.S. Historic district – Contributing property
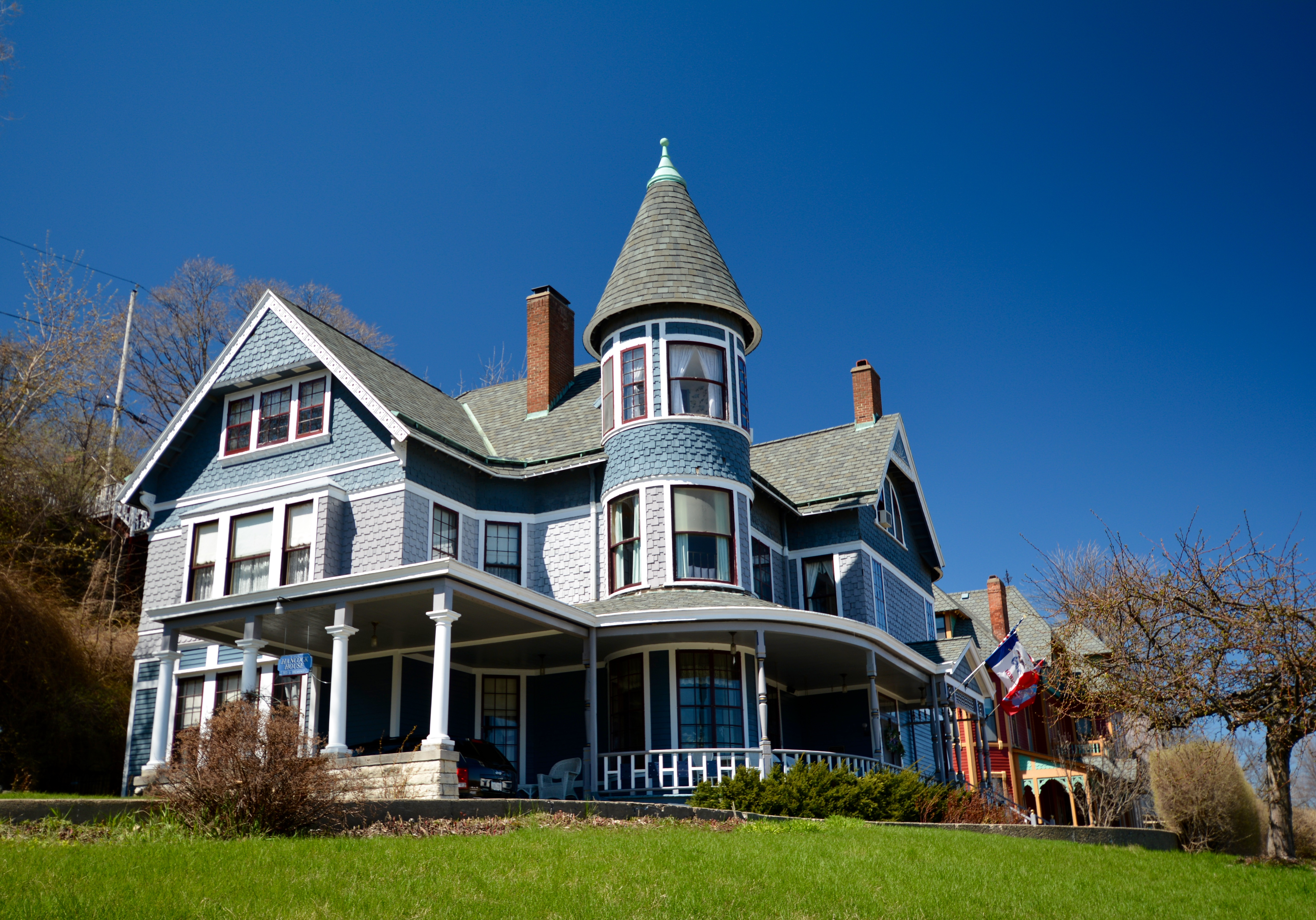

- Location within Iowa Location within the United States
- Location: 1105 Grove Terr. Dubuque, Iowa
- Coordinates: 42°30′09.8″N 90°40′17.7″W
- Area: less than one acre
- Built: 1890
- Architect: Frank D. Hyde
- Architectural style: Queen Anne
- Part of: West Eleventh Street Historic District (ID04000813)
- NRHP reference No.: 86000741
- Added to NRHP: April 10, 1986

The Charles T. Hancock House, also known as the Hancock-Gross House, is a historic building located in Dubuque, Iowa, United States. Hancock owned a large wholesale grocery firm. He hired local architect Frank D. Hyde to design this three-story frame Queen Anne. Completed in 1890, the house is situated on the brow of a 64-foot (20 m) bluff. It has views of the city below, as well as the hills of Wisconsin and Illinois across the Mississippi River. While restrained when compared with other houses in this style, it does feature an irregular plan, a wraparound porch, multiple roof lines, narrow bargeboards in the gables, and a corner tower with a conical roof. The house was individually listed on the National Register of Historic Places in 1986, and it was included as a contributing property in the West Eleventh Street Historic District in 2004.
