= West Eleventh Street Historic District (Dubuque, Iowa) =

Historic district in Iowa, United States

- U.S. National Register of Historic Places
- U.S. Historic district
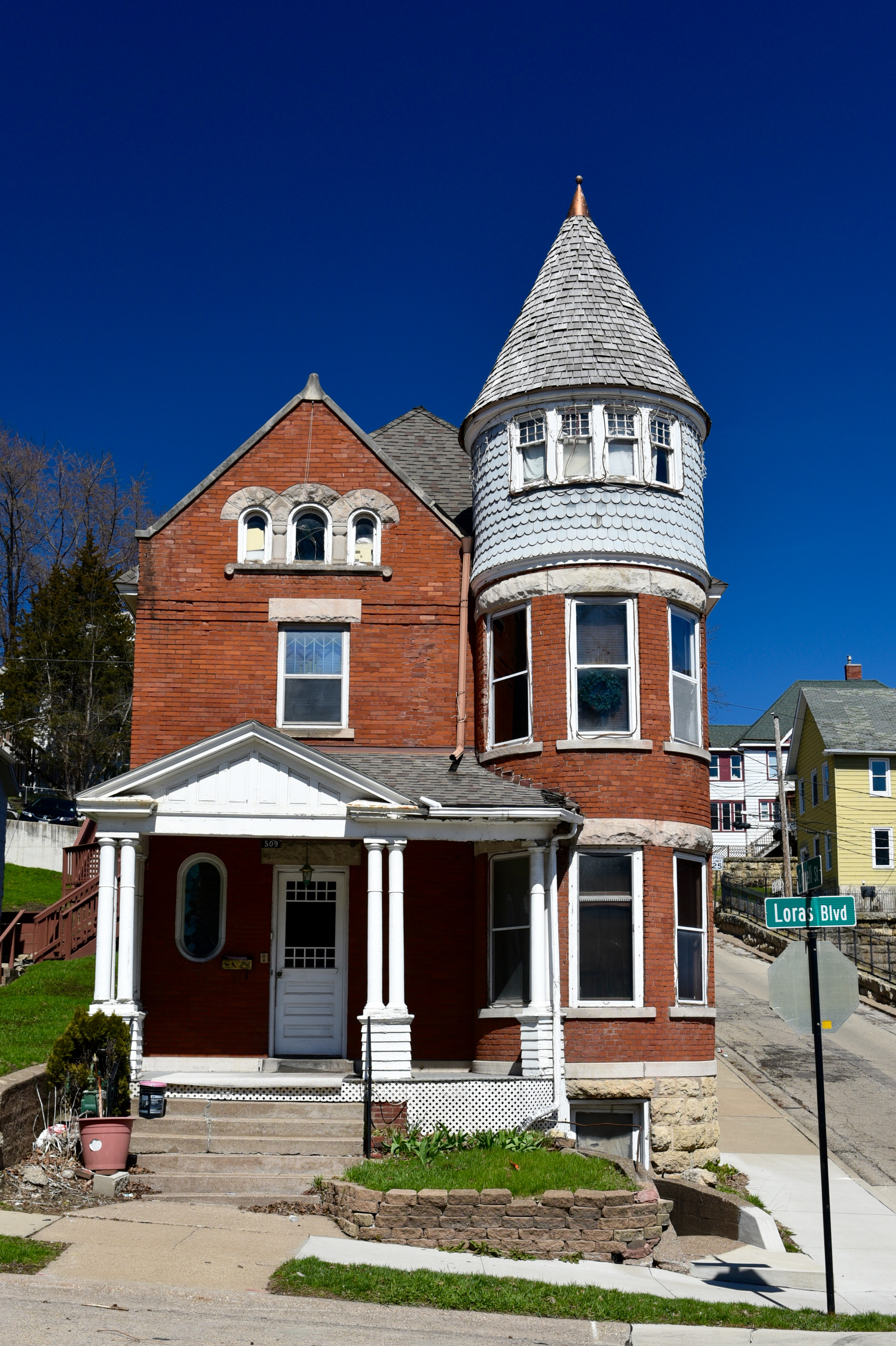
- 509 Loras Ave. (1897)

- Location within Iowa Location within the United States
- Location: Bounded by Grove Terrace, Loras Boulevard, and Wilbur and Walnut Sts., Dubuque, Iowa
- Coordinates: 42°30′09″N 90°40′25″W
- Area: 36.55 acres (14.79 ha)
- Architect: W.F. Guilburt; Fridolin Heer
- Architectural style: Federal; Classical Revival
- MPS: Dubuque, Iowa MPS
- NRHP reference No.: 04000814
- Added to NRHP: August 12, 2004

West Eleventh Street Historic District is a nationally recognized historic district located in Dubuque, Iowa, United States. It was listed on the National Register of Historic Places in 2004. At the time of its nomination it consisted of 288 resources, which included 191 contributing buildings, 32 contributing structures, 61 non-contributing buildings, two contributing sites, and one non-contributing structure. This district is a residential area on top of the bluff above the Jackson Park Historic District, which is in the river valley below. Its name comes from its historical association with the former West Eleventh Street Elevator, a funicular that was similar to the Fenelon Place Elevator to the south. For the most part the historic buildings here are single-family residences with their attendant out-buildings, although the number of out-buildings located here is relatively low. There is one apartment building and 46 duplexes. Some of the single-family houses were converted into multi-family residences, and then some of those were converted back. The various Victorian styles are found along the bluff fronts on the eastern and southern edge of the district, and vernacular structures on the northern and western sections. The Charles T. Hancock House (1890) was individually listed on the National Register. Given the steep bluffs in the district the historic structures are retaining walls and steps that replace the sidewalks.
