= Hancock House (Ticonderoga, New York) =

Historic house in New York, United States

- U.S. National Register of Historic Places
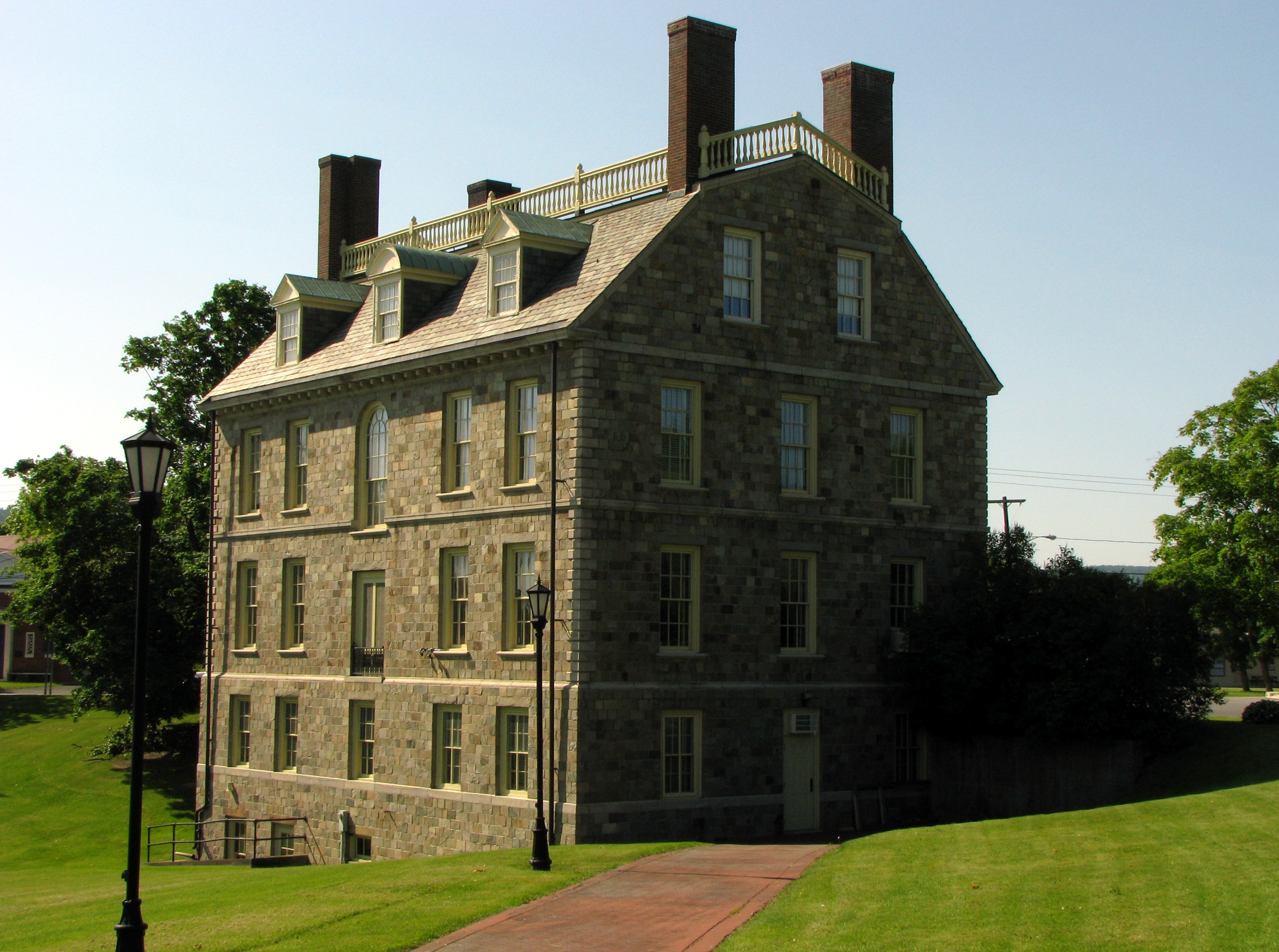
- Hancock House, Ticonderoga (rear view)

- Location within New York Location within the United States
- Location: Montcalm and Wicker Sts., Ticonderoga, New York
- Coordinates: 43°50′54″N 73°26′6″W
- Area: 1.4 acres (0.57 ha)
- Built: 1925–1926
- Built by: Edward F. Minor
- Architect: Max H. Westhoff
- Architectural style: Colonial Revival, Georgian Revival
- MPS: Ticonderoga MRA
- NRHP reference No.: 88002197
- Added to NRHP: November 15, 1988

The Hancock House is an historic structure in Ticonderoga, New York. It is a replica of the Hancock Manor on Boston's Beacon Hill that was the residence of Thomas Hancock, the uncle of Founding Father John Hancock.

The Hancock House was built by philanthropist Horace A. Moses for the New York State Historical Association as a repository for "American Traditions in History and the Fine Arts;" the Association used it as its "Headquarters House" until after World War II. It was built in 1925–1926, and is a 4 1/2-story, five bay by three bay, Georgian Revival style granite building. It has a slate covered gambrel roof and full basement.

It was added to the National Register of Historic Places in 1988.

== History ==
Born in Ticonderoga, Horace Augustus Moses became wealthy building and acquiring a number of paper mills that he combined to form the Strathmore Paper Company. As his wealth grew, he made a series of substantial donations to many Ticonderoga projects, among which were the Valley View Cemetery Chapel, the Liberty Monument, the Moses-Ludington Hospital, the Community Building, and the Hancock House; with the last of these, he accomplished an early lifetime ambition—to establish a museum with a library that would make Ticonderoga a focal point for public interest in the region's history.

The Hancock House Museum and Research Library was established in 1926. The Ticonderoga Historical Society today manages the building as a regional museum and reference library. There are exhibits throughout the Hancock House. The library houses a large collection of regional material on civic, social and economic matters and has one of the largest collections of genealogical resource materials in the region.

The house was built of Weymouth granite, the same stone as the original, from drawings made by John Sturgis before the original house was destroyed; the Hancock Manor House was demolished in 1863 to make room for two stately double brownstones. The main hall and stairway and the two rooms to the right of the hall are exact duplicates of those in the original house.

== Research ==
Ticonderoga history is emphasized in the collection of photographs, manuscripts, artifacts, and books kept in the museum. The museum has genealogical and local history information, from census information to obituaries to complete newspapers. The library comprises seven thousand volumes principally on New York State history, with an emphasis on material on the Lake Champlain, Lake George and Adirondack sections. Materials include:

- Ticonderoga Sentinel newspaper editions, dated from 1874 to Oct 1982 (on microfilm)
- Vermont Census 1790–1820 (on microfilm)
- Essex County Census 1830–1880 (on microfilm)
- New York State Federal Census 1790–1820 (on microfilm)
- Vermont Vital Records 1760–1870 (on microfilm)
- The 1925 Census data for Clinton County, New York
- Cemetery records for Ticonderoga, Crown Point & Schroon Lake
- An inventory of the Burt Garfield Loescher Paper, 1940–2002. "Robert Rogers' and the French and Indian War"

== Gallery ==
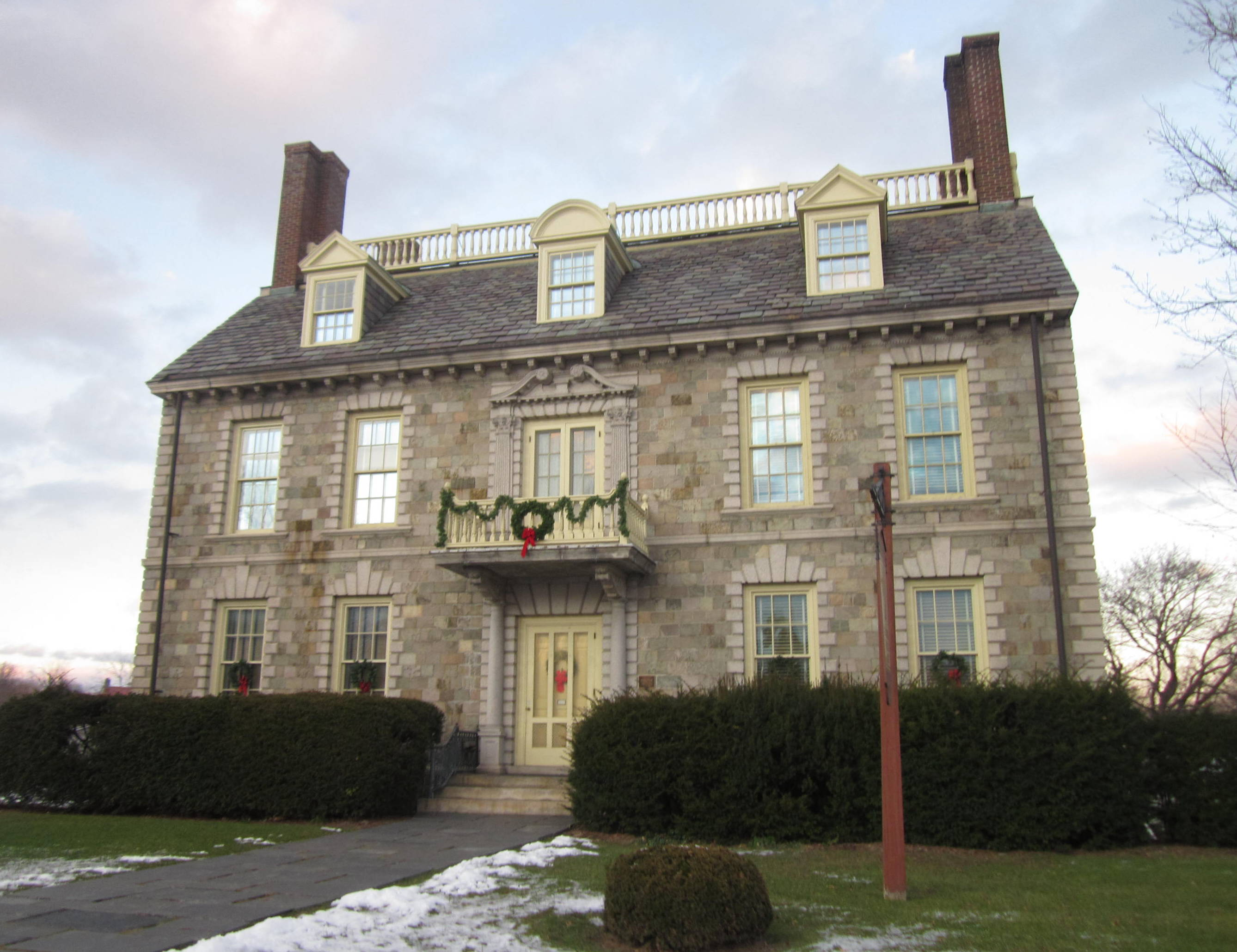
Hancock House, front view, December 2011
