= Horace A. Moses =

American industrialist and social engineer

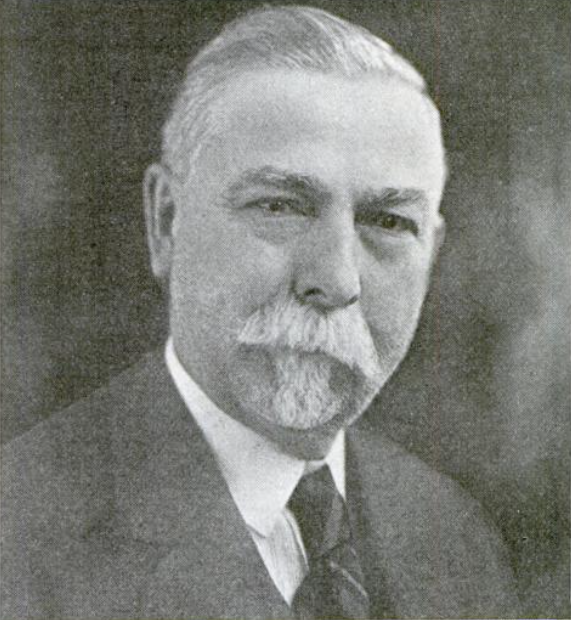
- Moses in 1926
- Born: Horace Augustus Moses; September 21, 1863; Ticonderoga, New York, United States
- Died: April 7, 1947 (aged 83); Springfield, Massachusetts, United States
- Occupation: Manufacturer/Philanthropist
- Years active: 1892–1947
- Spouse: Alice A. Elliot Moses (1895–1947)
- Awards: Silver Beaver Award (Boy Scouts of America)

Horace Augustus Moses (1863-1947) was a prominent industrialist and profound social engineer who founded Mittineague Paper Company in West Springfield, Massachusetts, which later became Strathmore Paper Company. He is also noted for his involvement in forming Junior Achievement and for property transactions with the Boy Scouts of America. Moses was also an active member of the board at Green Mountain Junior College. Moses Hall, on the campus of Green Mountain College is named for Mr. Moses, whose donations helped build the hall in 1912, and keep it up for many years after his death.

He was a recognized philanthropist and donated time and finances towards the betterment of youth, the furthering of the arts, and the study of agricultural sciences. His image was featured on a U.S. stamp in 1984, and his legacy of charity carries on via the numerous organizations he founded and funded during his lifetime.

In 1956, the Horace A. Moses Foundation published "Achievement is my Goal", which detailed the life and times of Moses. It was written by Harry L. Lane and F. Nelson Bridgham. The work is out of print as of 2012.

== Strathmore Paper Company ==
Shortly after relocating to Springfield, Massachusetts, Moses established the Mittineague Paper Mill in West Springfield, Massachusetts, on February 18, 1892, at age 30 and with $100,000 of authorized capital. Shortly thereafter, in 1894, he traveled to the Strathmore Valley in Scotland, where he observed the structure of factory towns. In 1904, he acquired the Woronoco Paper Co. (then known as a "cursed" mill) in Westfield, Massachusetts, and operated it as a stand-alone company, meanwhile developing the surrounding village into a factory town with a notably high standard of living. In 1914, Mittineague Paper Mill and Woronoco Paper Company were combined and the Strathmore Paper Company, named for his travels in Scotland, was formed. The surrounding villages became factory towns with remarkably high standards of living. Hammermill Papers acquired Strathmore in 1962.

== Junior Achievement ==
Moses began working with the fledgling Junior Achievement program in 1919 and was named chairman of the recently established Junior Achievement Bureau in October, 1920. He would serve in this capacity for 27 years until his death in 1947. He constructed Achievement Hall in West Springfield, Massachusetts on the Eastern States Exposition grounds. Between 1925 and 1927, In 1984, Moses was featured on a 20 cent U.S. stamp honoring him as the founder of Junior Achievement, although several First day of issue prints incorrectly list his date of birth as 1862.

== Contributions to Ticonderoga, New York ==
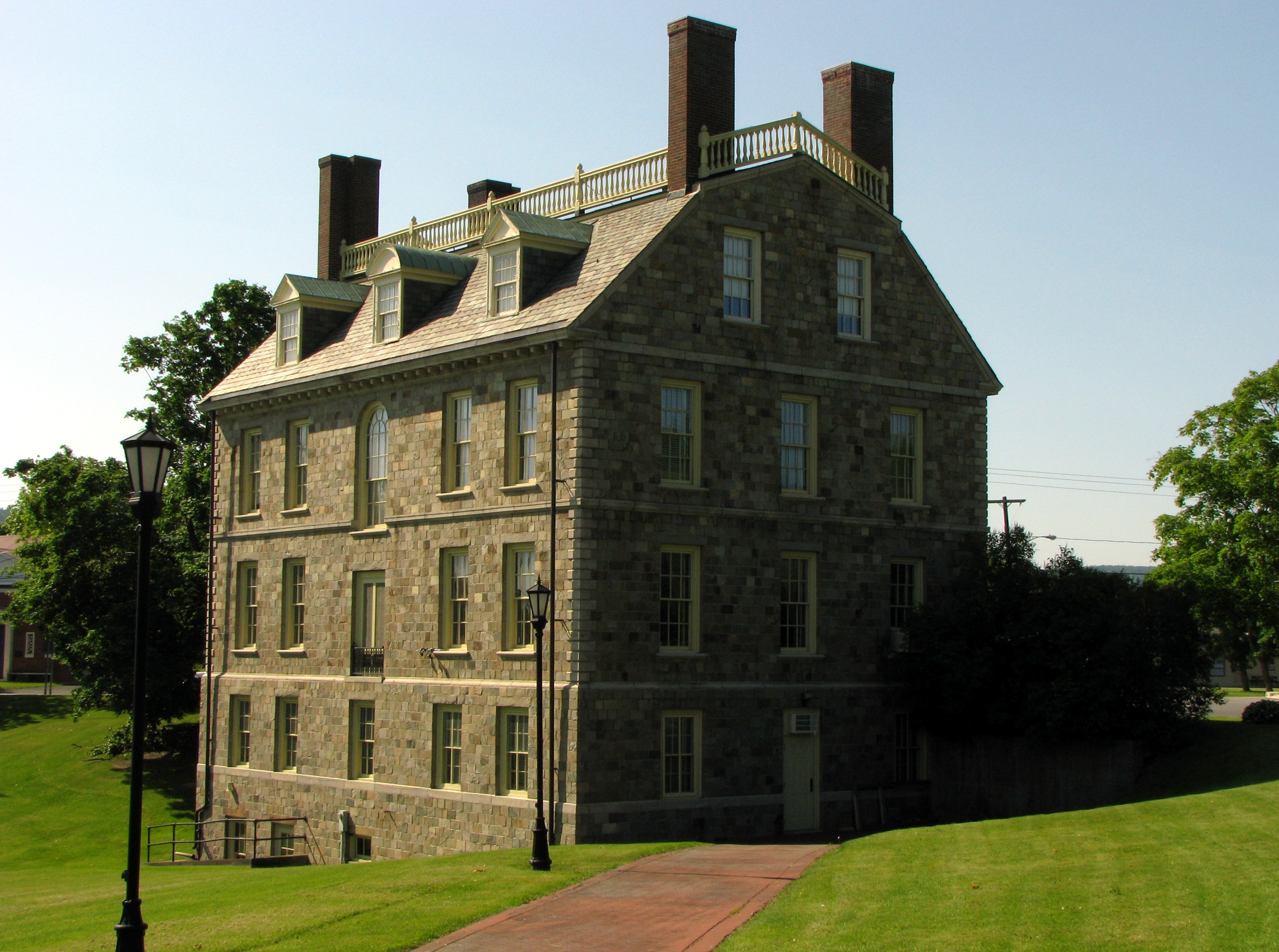
Hancock House, Ticonderoga, New York

Moses continued making financial contributions to arts and sciences in his hometown, Ticonderoga, New York, throughout his life. He constructed the Hancock House (Ticonderoga, New York) in 1925 and funded other projects, including the Liberty Monument, Moses-Ludington Hospital, and the Community House.

== Boy Scouts of America ==
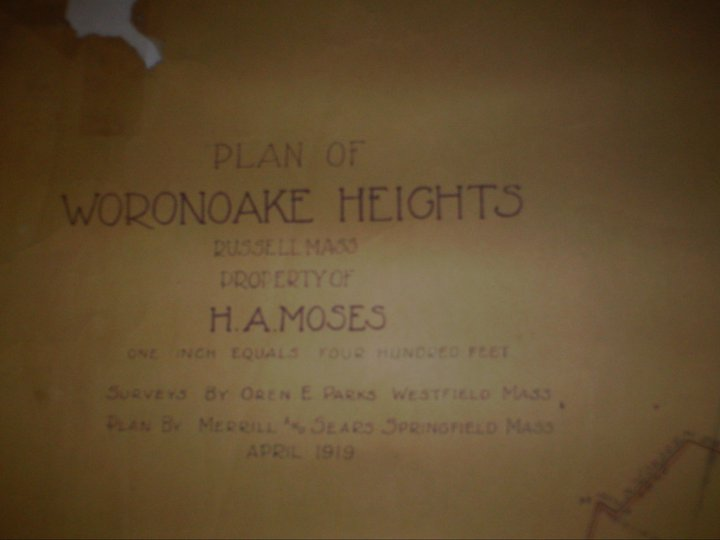
Property acquisition map of Woronoake Heights

Beginning in 1919, Moses began acquiring land in the South Quarter section of Russell, Massachusetts. The hill-top property, known as Woronoake Heights, became the Moses' summer estate and encompassed 1600 acres, including a private 90-acre lake (now known as Russell Pond and formerly as Hazzard Pond). The family, along with numerous summer staff, raised prized apples, steer, and award-winning hunting dogs on the property. Shortly before his death in 1947, he began selling sections of the estate to the Hampden Council of the Boy Scouts of America. The council operated the property as the Horace A. Moses Scout Reservation and included three camps, although these have since been consolidated into a single facility. Today, many structures original to Moses still stand, including his weekend home, known locally as The Manor House (and formerly as "Memorial Lodge"). Other remaining buildings (and their current names/uses within the camp) include the dairy milking station (blacksmith shop), guest house (Sachem Lodge), and caretaker cabin (Overlook Lodge) The camp is now operated by the Western Massachusetts Council of the Boy Scouts of America. The Silver Beaver Award given to Moses now hangs in the camp office.

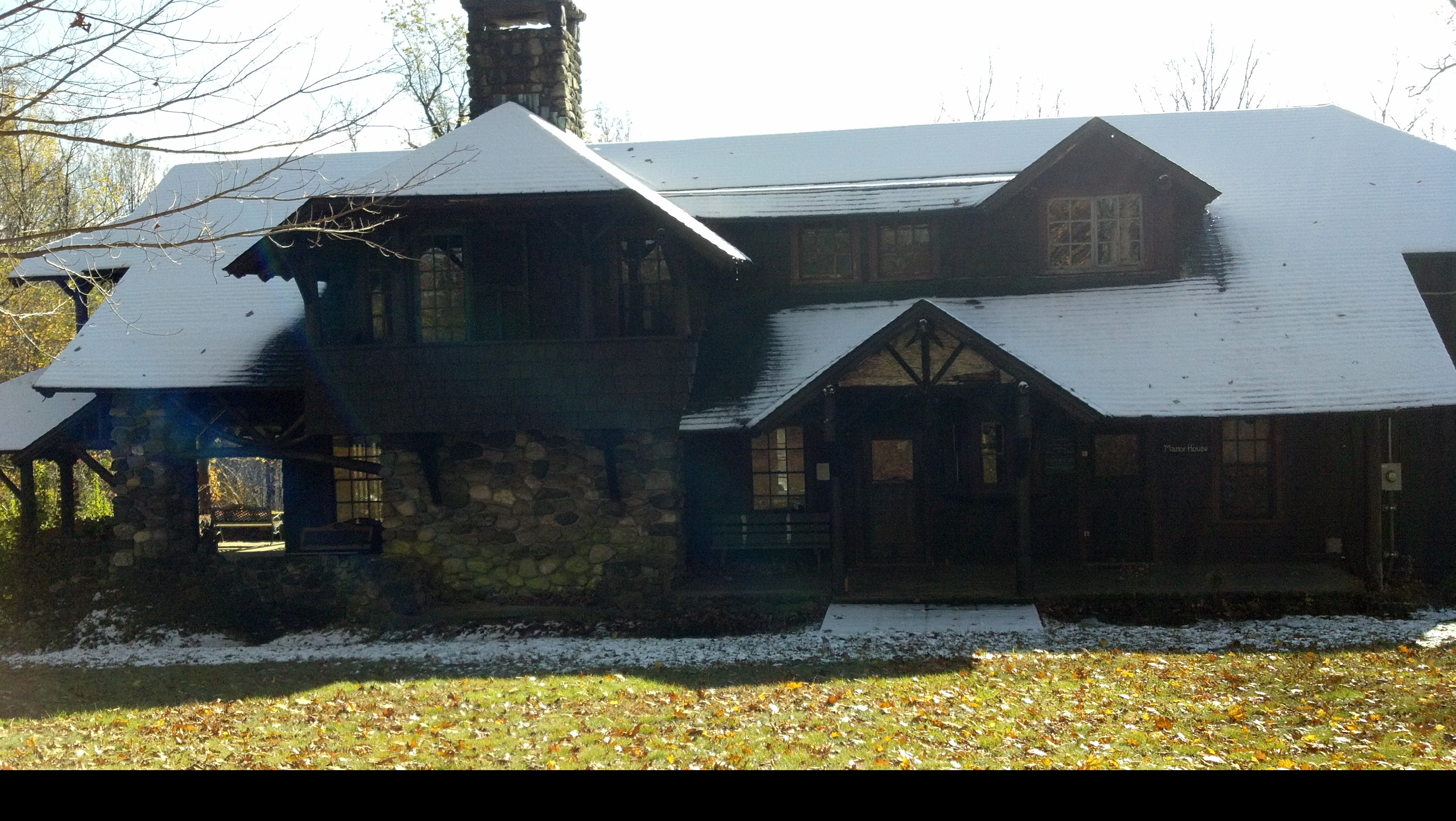
The Manor House in 2011

== National Committee on Boys and Girls Club Work and 4-H ==
Mr. Moses was an early friend of 4-H Club Work. A member of the National Committee on Boys and Girls Club Work from 1925-1945, he also funded the Horace A. Moses Building at the Eastern States Exposition and sponsored the International 4-H Leader Training School in Springfield, Massachusetts.

The top winners in the 4-H Leadership awards program at National 4-H Congress traditionally received the prestigious Moses Leadership trophy, presented in the name of Horace A. Moses. His interests in agriculture made him the impetus of what would become the Eastern States Exposition.

Beginning in the late 1930s, in addition to receiving the Moses silver trophy, the top boy and girl in Leadership also received a $300 scholarship personally funded by Edward Foss Wilson, of Chicago, the son of Thomas E. Wilson, and president of Wilson & Company, major meat-packers in America. In 1942 the scholarship amount for the two top recipients of the award by Edward Foss Wilson was dropped to $200 each, however $100 scholarships were also awarded to the first boy and girl alternates.

The annual Awards Handbook for 1941, for the first time, describes the Moses Trophy as being awarded annually by the International 4-H Training School, which was sponsored by Horace A. Moses. In 1949 The Annual Awards Handbook lists the donor of the trophies as the H. A. Moses Foundation, Springfield, Massachusetts.

According to Alvin Davis, a 1948 Moses Trophy winner, the historic Moses trophies were held annually by the two top recipients as a form of "traveling trophy" and then returned to be presented the following year to the new top Leadership winners.

== Personal ==
Not much is known about Moses outside of his business and philanthropic interests, except that he was a devoted religious man and member of the Trinity United Methodist Church in Springfield, MA. A painted portrait sits above the mantel in the church's foyer's fireplace. The Fifteenth Census of the United States taken in 1930 shows Horace A. Moses living with his wife Alice E. in the sixth ward of Springfield, Massachusetts, in what is today the Forest Park neighborhood, along with a maid and a chef (both live-in). The house was valued at $31,000, adjusted for inflation to roughly $380,000 in 2010 dollars. Following her husband's death in 1947, Alice Moses lived full-time at Woronoake Heights, while continuing to slowly sell off the property around her to the Boy Scouts. After her death in 1962, Alice was buried with her husband in Glen Path South of Springfield Cemetery in Springfield, MA. Mr. and Mrs. Moses had one daughter, Madeline Moses, born on March 4, 1896, in Springfield, Massachusetts. She died in Weston, Fairfield Co., Connecticut on September 24, 1993, at the age of 97. Madeline was college educated but never married and was the manager of the Horace A. Moses Foundation up to the time of her death.
