= Hancock Manor =

Historic house in Boston, Massachusetts

Coordinates: 42°21′27″N 71°3′51″W

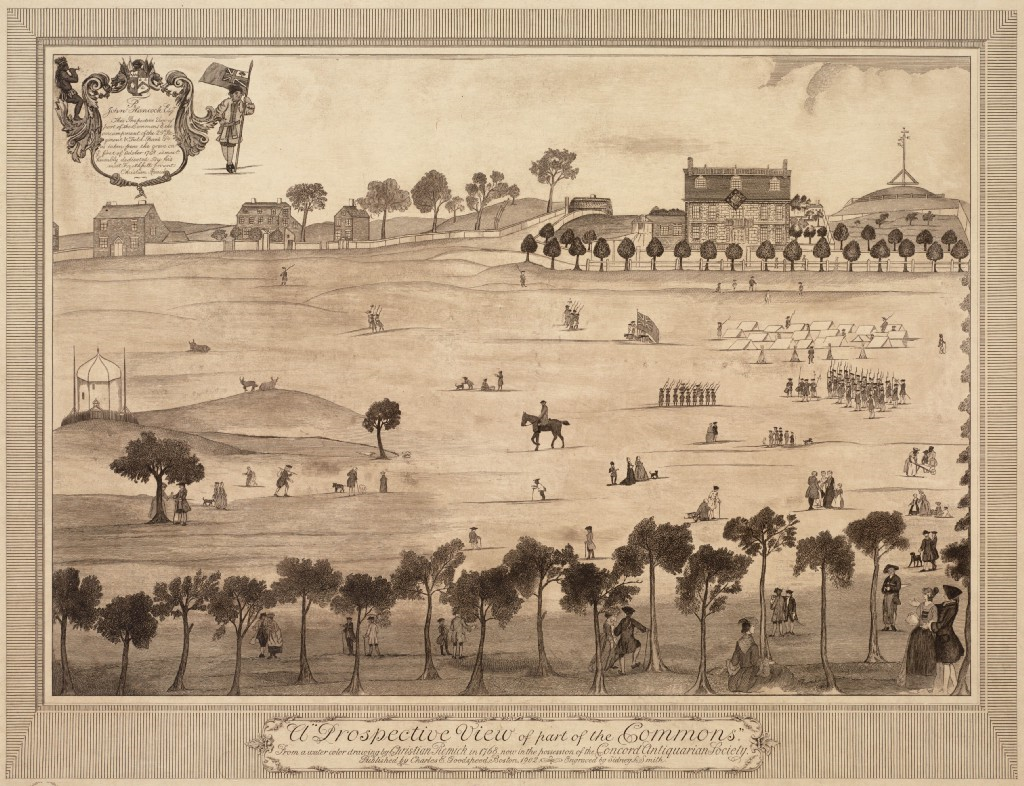
View of John Hancock's house from across the Common, 1768

The Hancock Manor was a house located at 30 Beacon Street in the Beacon Hill neighborhood of Boston, Province of Massachusetts Bay. It stood near the southwest corner of what are today the grounds of the Massachusetts State House. It was the home of United States Founding Father John Hancock. The house, built in 1734–1737, was demolished in 1863.

== Description ==
The Manor was built between 1734 and 1737 by Joshua Blanchard for the wealthy merchant Thomas Hancock (1703–1764). It was the first house to be erected on the top of Beacon Hill west of the summit and stood alone with no westward neighbor until around 1768, when the portrait painter John Singleton Copley built a house farther down the slope.

Thomas willed the property to his wife Lydia Henchman (1714–1776). She died childless, leaving it to her favorite nephew John. In its heyday it was considered the finest house in the entire Province of Massachusetts Bay and belonged to Boston's richest family. A three-story granite mansion, it overlooked the pastureland of Boston Common. It was surrounded by a family estate that included various outbuildings, gardens, orchards, fruit-tree nurseries, and pastures, and extended from today's Joy Street on the west to Park Street on the east and from Beacon Street on the south to near Derne Street on the north. The family farm went up the side of the then existing peak of Beacon Hill where the State House annex now stands. Slaves lived on the property.

The Manor's brown stone walls were massive (the front was 56' in length), made of Quincy granite obtained from the surface, squared and well hammered. A balcony projected over the entrance door, upon which opened a large ornamental window. The balcony door was adorned with a cap that ended in baroque volutes. The corners and window openings were ornamented with Braintree stone, and the tiled gambrel deck roof featured a carved railing. Three dormer windows jutted out from the roof, which offered a beautiful, extensive view. The grounds were protected from the street by a low stone wall, on which was placed a light wooden fence with gateposts of the same material. A paved walk and a dozen granite steps with sandstone trim led to the mansion, situated at a little distance back from the street on ground elevated above it. The approach was then through a neat garden bordered with small trees and shrubbery. Before the broad front door (garnished with pillars and an ornamental door head) was a wide stone slab at the head of a flight of stone steps. A wooden hall, designed for festive occasions, sixty feet in length, was joined to the northern wing; this was moved to Allen Street in 1818. The east wing contained a great ballroom; the west was used for the kitchen and other domestic offices; beyond this lay the coach house and adjoining stable.

The interior comprised a nobly paneled hall, having a broad staircase with carved and twisted balusters, which divided the house in the middle and extended through on both stories from front to rear. On the landing, partway up the staircase, was the circular-headed window that looked out upon the garden and the city, with a broad and capacious window seat. On the entrance floor, at the right of the hall, was the great dining room, 17' × 25', also elaborately paneled from floor to ceiling.

Miss Eliza G. Gardner, who lived in the Manor for many years, described the interior and garden as follows:

As you entered the governor's mansion, to the right was the drawing or reception room, with furniture of bird's-eye maple covered with rich damask. Out of this opened the dining-hall [...] in which Hancock gave the famous breakfast to Admiral D'Estaing and his officers. Opposite this was a smaller apartment, the usual dining-hall of the family; next adjoining were the china-room and offices, with coach-house and barn behind. At the left of the entrance was a second saloon, or family drawing-room, the walls covered with crimson paper. The upper and lower halls were hung with pictures of game, hunting-scenes, and other subjects. Passing through this hall, another flight of steps led through the garden to a small summer-house close to Mt. Vernon Street. The grounds were laid out in ornamental flower-beds bordered with box; box-trees of large size, with a great variety of fruit, among which were several immense mulberry-trees, dotted the garden.

== Revolution and Early Republic ==
British soldiers pillaged the house about the time of the Battle of Lexington in April 1775; they also broke down and mutilated the fences for firewood, until a complaint by the selectmen caused General Gage to send Percy to occupy it. He remained there for some time during the Siege of Boston. That March, British officers had allegedly set an example to their men by hacking the fences with their swords, breaking windows, etc. A few days later Hancock was again disturbed by the redcoats, who refused to leave the premises at his request and mockingly told him his possessions would soon be theirs.

The Hancock Manor became the headquarters of General Henry Clinton while he remained in Boston; he took command at Charlestown in September 1775. Both house and stables were in part occupied by the wounded from Bunker Hill. The house, however, remained relatively intact during the occupation, the furniture showing little signs of damage and the paintings none.

It was in this center of Colonial society that Hancock entertained d'Estaing in 1778, Lafayette in 1781, George Washington in 1789, Jacques Pierre Brissot, and later Lords Stanley and Wortley, and Labouchière and Bougainville. Hancock himself continued to live in the Manor while Governor; indeed it was called the "seat of his Excellency the Governor" at the time.

When d'Estaing visited, he was under a cloud for having deserted Colonial forces in Rhode Island, but the generous Hancock nevertheless entertained him hospitably. Some forty French officers dined daily at his table, and on one occasion the unusually high number of guests forced the servants to milk the cows on Boston Common (although these belonged to other owners). Brissot was astonished that Hancock was friends with Nathaniel Balch, a humorous hatter. It appears that the dying governor called Balch to his bedside and dictated to him the minutes of his will, in which he gave the Manor to the Massachusetts government. However, he died before his will could be properly drawn up.

In 1795, two years after John Hancock's death, the town of Boston purchased most of the estate for £4,000 and designated the pasture land as the site of the state's future capitol.

== Demolition and legacy ==
The Hancock Manor, ca. 1860. The woman standing on the left of the balcony is identified as Elizabeth Lowell Hancock Moriarty, the great-grandniece of Governor John Hancock.

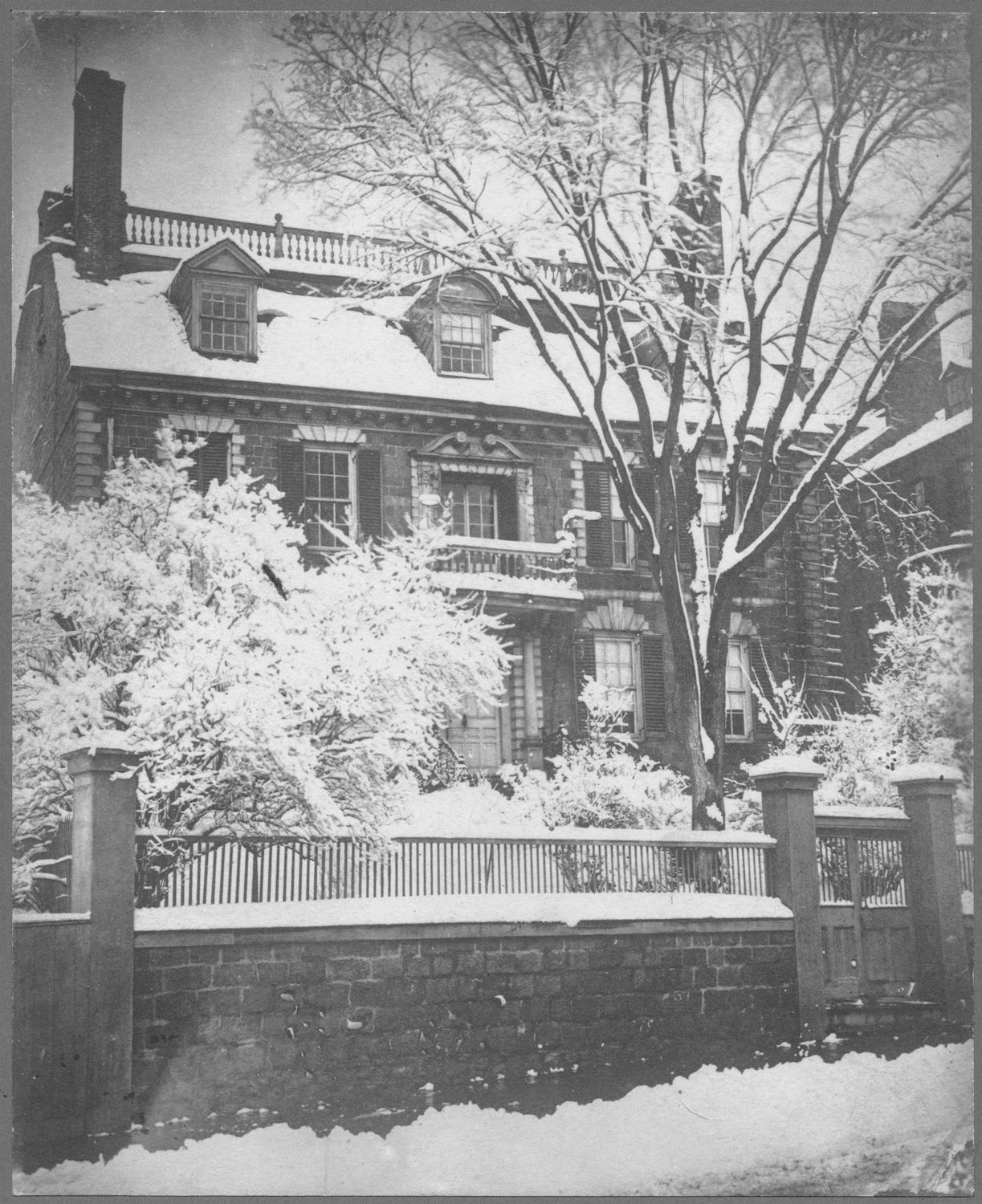
Winter view of the Hancock Mansion, ca.1860

In 1859, Governor Nathaniel Banks proposed that the Commonwealth should purchase it for a governor's mansion, and the heirs offered it at a low valuation of $100,000. An influential joint committee of the Legislature reported favorably upon the measure, but it met with strong opposition from the rural districts and was defeated. A suggestion was also offered to make it a museum for the collection of Revolutionary relics. Though it had fallen into neglect, the house was excellently preserved: the interior woodwork was sound, the chamber of Lafayette remained as when he slept in it, the apartment in which Hancock died was intact; the audience hall was the same in which Washington, d'Estaing, Brissot, Percy, and many more had stood; the entrance hall, in which Hancock's body had lain in state for eight days, continued to open upon the broad staircase. It contained many of the furnishings and decorations of his time, with the family portraits by Copley and Smybert.

State action failing, the land which it occupied was sold for $125,000 on February 18, 1863, during the Civil War. For some months it served as a museum of historical relics and efforts were made by the city to secure objects found inside the building. The heirs offered the mansion, with the pictures and some other objects of historical interest, as a free gift, with the intent of preserving it as a memento of Colonial and Revolutionary history. A scheme for its removal and re-erection elsewhere failed; the Legislature did not want to invest $12,000 to have the house transferred to another location. On June 16, 1863, at one o'clock, the Hancock Manor was sold at public auction and was purchased for $230. The terms of the sale were cash down and the purchaser, Willard Dalrymple, had ten days to have everything removed. The building was torn down despite public outcry and souvenirs of it were actively sought as it fell. The knocker on the front door was given to Oliver Wendell Holmes Sr., a friend of the Hancock family, who placed it on his home in Cambridge, where it remained until it too was demolished. The flight of stone steps which led up to the entrance was purchased at the public auction and relocated to the outside of Pinebank Mansion in Jamaica Plain. The mansion was demolished in 2007, but the steps were kept and refurbished the following year.

Memorial plaque.

The purchasers of the land, James Madison Beebe (No. 30) and Gardner Brewer (No. 29), two leading Boston merchants, erected a stately double brownstone house for their occupancy. Messrs. Ginn and Company publishers became established at No. 29 in 1901. For fifteen years their business offices fully occupied the spacious interior of the former Brewer residence which stood on the site of the Hancock Manor. In 1916 the marble extension of the Bulfinch Front of the State House to the west, and the taking of the surrounding grounds, necessitated the elimination of Hancock Avenue (a footway connecting Beacon and Mt. Vernon streets) and the removal of several of the houses, including 29 and 30 Beacon St.

The Hancock Manor's demolition spurred a historic preservation movement that would help save buildings like the Old South Meeting House, the Old State House and the Hancock–Clarke House within the next few decades. An 18" × 21" bronze plaque, located on the iron wall below the State House's marble west wing, indicates the mansion's former location. It reads: "Here stood the residence of John Hancock, a prominent and patriotic Merchant of Boston, the first Signer of the Declaration of American Independence, and First Governor of Massachusetts, under the State Constitution".

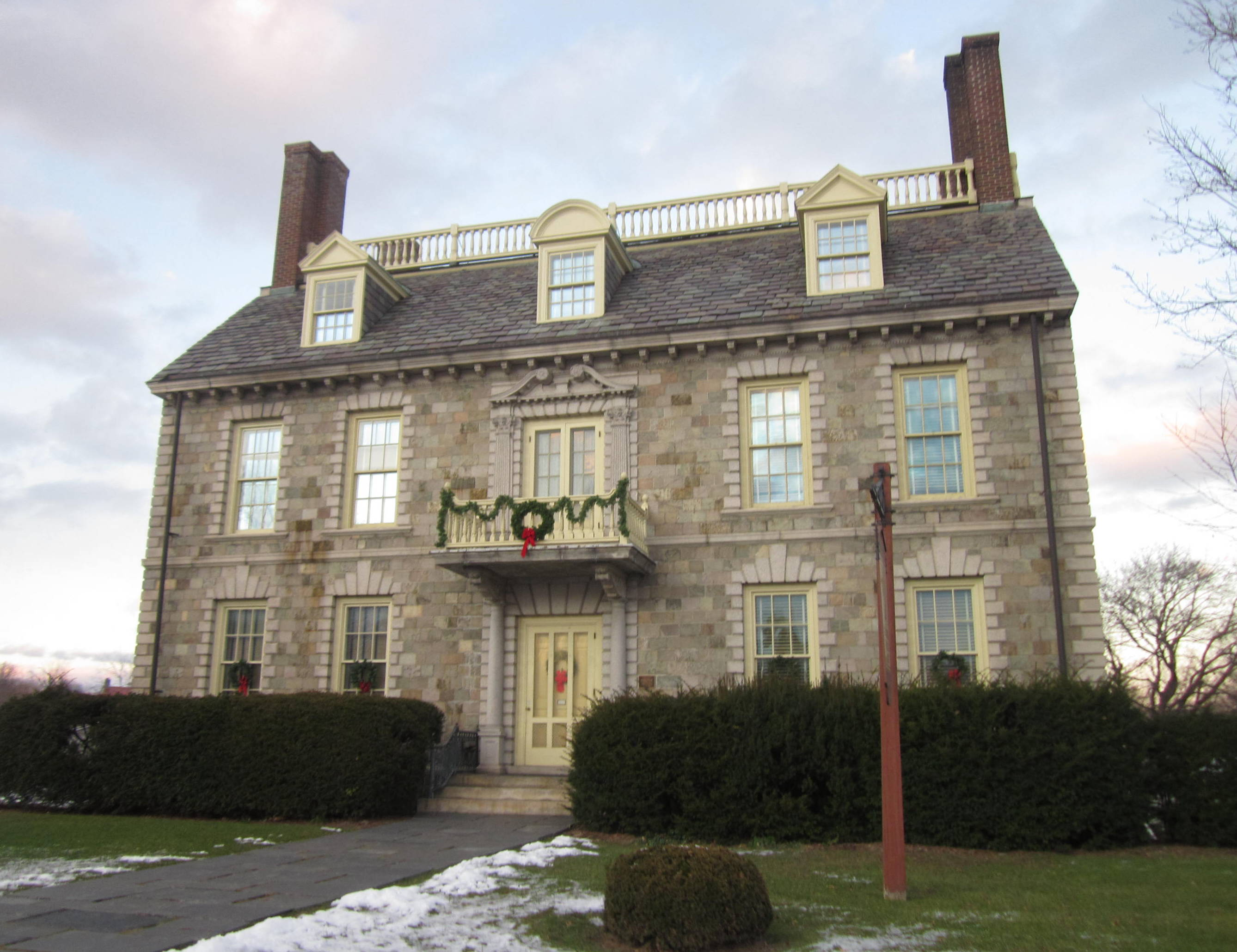
Replica, known as the Hancock House, Ticonderoga, New York.

A replica of the building, known as the Hancock House, was constructed in Ticonderoga, New York in 1926 from the original plans, for use as a museum; it is still in use, presently as the home of the Ticonderoga Historical Society.

== See also ==
- Hancock House (Ticonderoga, New York)
