= Reverend John Hancock =

Reverend John Hancock may refer to:

- John Hancock Sr. (1671–1752), colonial American clergyman and paternal grandfather of American politician John Hancock
- John Hancock Jr. (1702–1744), colonial American clergyman and father of American politician John Hancock
- Rev. John Hancock House, Cider Mill and Cemetery, Florham Park, New Jersey, listed on the National Register of Historic Places listings in Morris County, New Jersey

== See also ==
- John Hancock (disambiguation)
