= John Hancock (disambiguation) =

John Hancock (1735–1793) was an American Founding Father, merchant, statesman, and prominent patriot of the American Revolution.

John Hancock may also refer to:

== People ==
Ordered chronologically

- John Hancock Sr. (1671–1752), American clergyman and paternal grandfather of the American statesman
- John Hancock Jr. (1702–1744), American clergyman and father of the American statesman
- John Hancock (silversmith) (1732–1784), American silversmith
- John Hancock (ornithologist) (1808–1890), British naturalist
- John Hancock (Texas politician) (1824–1893), American judge and politician
- John Hancock (Australian politician) (1846–1899), Australian trade unionist and politician
- John Hancock (British politician) (1857–1940), British Liberal Party politician
- John Milton Hancock (1883–1956), American engineer, navy man and manager
- John W. Hancock (1901–1993), American football player, athlete and coach
- John E. Hancock (1903–1982), American farmer and politician in Vermont
- John Hancock (venereologist) (1923–1974), British venereologist and editor
- John D. Hancock (born 1939), American film director
- John Hancock (actor) (1941–1992), American actor
- John Lee Hancock (born 1956), American screenwriter
- John Hancock, a man shot in 1982 by Alvin and Judith Neelley
- John Hancock (Australian businessman) (born 1976), West Australian mining magnate
- John Hancock, member of the Late Night Alumni, an American house music group established in 2003
- John Hancock (rugby) (1932–2011), English rugby union and rugby league player

== Fictional characters ==
- John Hancock, the main character in the film Hancock
- "John Hancock" (Agents of S.H.I.E.L.D.: Slingshot)
- John Hancock, a companion in Fallout 4

== Buildings ==
- John Hancock Building, the name of three different buildings in Boston, Massachusetts (includes the John Hancock Tower, below)
- John Hancock Center, a building in Chicago, Illinois
- John Hancock Tower, a building in Boston, Massachusetts

== Other uses ==
- John Hancock, used in the United States as a synonym for a signature
- USS John Hancock (DD-981), a U.S. destroyer in service 1979–2000
- USS John Hancock (1850), a U.S. naval tug in service 1850s
- John Hancock Bowl, a college football bowl game played from 1989 to 1993 in El Paso, Texas
- John Hancock Financial, a US subsidiary of Manulife

== See also ==
- Jonathan Hancock (born 1972), British radio presenter and memory expert
- Johnny Hancocks (1919–1994), English footballer for Wolves
- John Handcock (disambiguation)
