= Thomas Hancock (merchant) =

American merchant and politician (1703–1764)

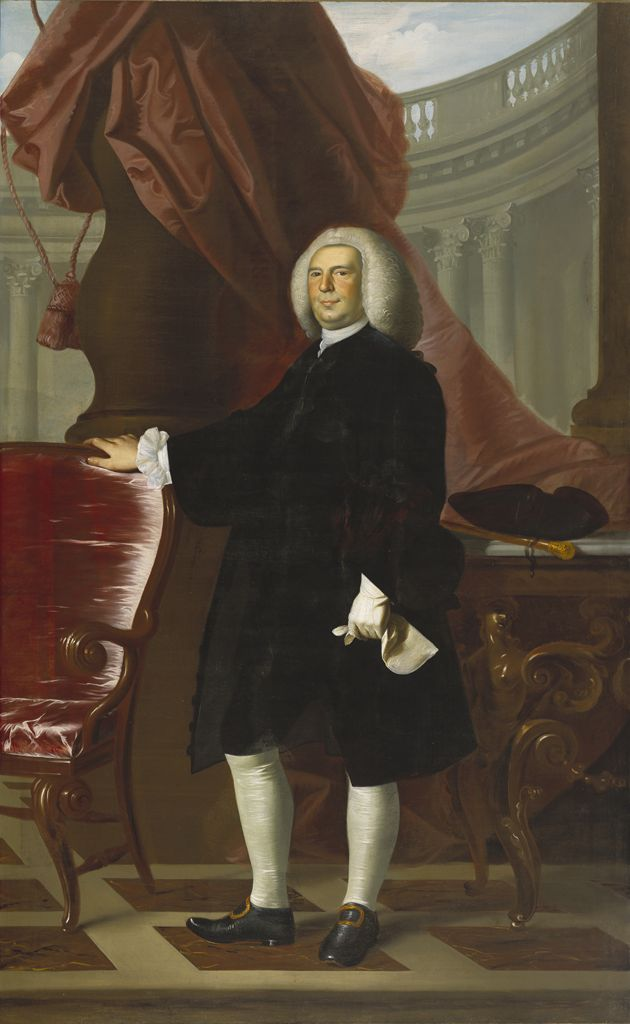
- Portrait by John Singleton Copley, 1764–1766
- Born: July 13, 1703; Lexington, Massachusetts
- Died: August 1, 1764 (aged 61); Boston, Massachusetts
- Occupations: Merchant, politician
- Spouse: Lydia Henchman (m. 1730)
- Parent(s): John Hancock Sr. Elizabeth Clark
- Relatives: John Hancock (nephew)

Thomas Hancock (July 17, 1703 – August 1, 1764) was an American merchant and politician best known for being the uncle of Founding Father and statesman John Hancock. The son of a Congregationalist preacher, Thomas Hancock rose from obscurity to become one of the wealthiest businessmen in colonial Massachusetts, accumulating a 70,000 pound fortune over the course of his lifetime and becoming the proprietor of his own mercantile firm.

Born in Lexington, Massachusetts, Thomas Hancock became apprenticed to Boston bookseller Samuel Gerrish as an indentured servant at the age of 14. After the contract expired in 1724, Thomas Hancock eventually opened his own bookstore before expanding into the fledgling colonial publishing sector as well. In 1730, Thomas Hancock married Lydia Henchman, daughter of a business partner, the publisher and bookseller Daniel Henchman.

After his marriage to Lydia, Thomas Hancock entered into a partnership with prominent Boston merchant and slave trader Charles Apthorp, eventually rising to become one of the leading merchants in the city. Thomas Hancock soon expanded his business interests into a broad variety of mercantile sectors, becoming the proprietor of the House of Hancock, which exported rum, whale oil and fish, built ships, and imported books and luxury goods.

In 1752, Thomas Hancock formally became involved with Massachusetts politics after abstaining from political affairs for most of his life, taking a seat on the Governor's Council. On August 1, 1764, Thomas Hancock suffered a stroke while entering the council chamber and died. After Hancock's death, his last will and testament deeded all properties owned by the House of Hancock to his nephew John Hancock and his personal mansion to Lydia.

== Early life ==
Thomas Hancock was born on July 17, 1703, in the town of Lexington, Massachusetts. His father, The Rev. John Hancock Sr., was an Anglican clergyman who after a one-year stint of preaching in Medford was invited in 1697 to serve as the town preacher of Lexington; Hancock Sr. served as preacher there for 55 years until his death in 1752. Thomas Hancock's mother, Elizabeth Clarke, died two years after her husband in 1760.

In 1717, when Thomas Hancock was 14 years old, he was apprenticed to Boston bookseller Samuel Gerrish as an indentured servant, with his contract stipulating that he remain working under Gerrish until 1724. After his indenture contract with Gerrish expired, Thomas Hancock soon opened his own bookstore in the North End of Boston, eventually expanding into the fledgling colonial publishing sector as well; during this period, Boston was the centre of publishing in the Thirteen Colonies, bolstered by a freedom of the press which was almost non-existent in Europe.

In 1730, Thomas Hancock married Lydia Henchman, the daughter of publisher and bookseller Daniel Henchman. Thomas Hancock already held a long-established relationship to Daniel prior to marrying Lydia, as the two worked as business partners in the paper production and Thomas had previously worked as a clerk in Daniel's bookstore; a year prior, Hancock had joined forces with Henchman and other Boston businessmen in constructing a paper mill in Milton. During this period, Thomas Hancock also ordered the construction of large mansion on Beacon Hill.

== Business career ==
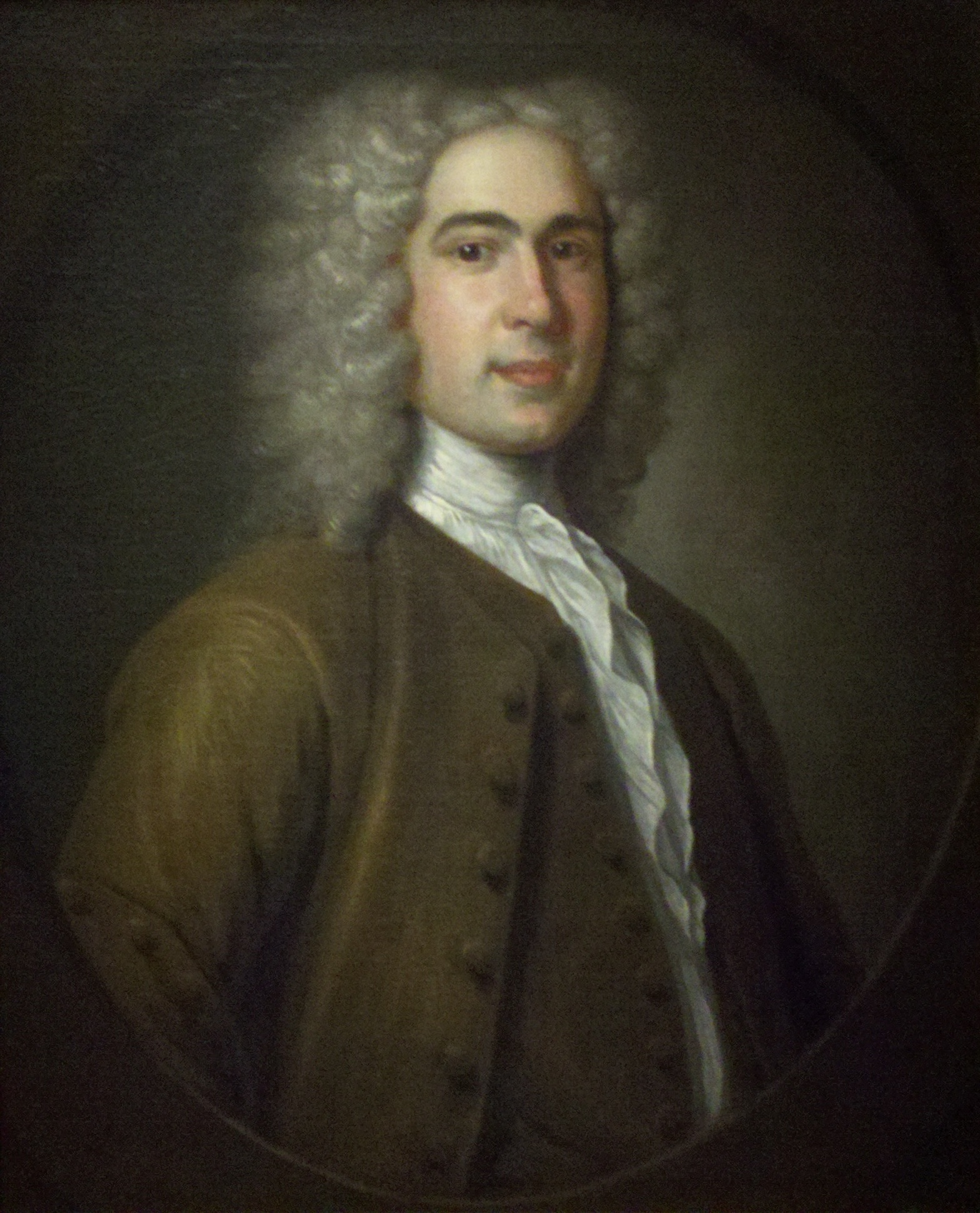
1730 portrait of Hancock by John Smibert

After his marriage to Lydia, Thomas Hancock subsequently entered into a partnership with Boston merchant and slave trader Charles Apthorp. Thomas Hancock soon expanded his business interests beyond bookselling and publishing and, according to historian William Pencak, into "a general trade that soon involved the entire British empire." He became the proprietor of a firm known as the House of Hancock, which exported rum, whale oil and fish to Europe and the West Indies, engaged in building ships and imported European books and luxury goods to Massachusetts.

During the French and Indian Wars, including the War of Jenkins' Ear, King George's War, and the French and Indian War, Thomas Hancock made a fortune supplying British Army and Royal Navy personnel stationed in the West Indies and North America. Despite his wealth and prominence in Bostonian society, Thomas Hancock did not seek political office during this period, though he remained in close contact with prominent politicians in North America and England, such as colonial agent Christopher Kilby, who facilitated his lucrative military contracts with the British Crown.

In 1744, after Thomas Hancock's brother John died, his nephew (also named John) was sent to live in the Hancock household, which included several domestic servants and slaves. Since Thomas and Lydia had no children of their own, they focused their attentions on John Hancock and soon became the dominant influence in his life. After graduating from Harvard College in 1754, John Hancock started working for his uncle in the House of Hancock, learning much about his uncle's businesses during this period; he was also trained for an eventual partnership in the firm.

In 1755, 17 sloops jointly owned by Thomas Hancock and Apthorp were involved in transporting Acadians from Nova Scotia to French Louisiana during their forced removal by the British; other ships owned by the pair were employed as privateers during times of conflict. The conditions on board the sloops transporting Acadians were abysmal; American historian Mark Peterson describes them as being "fitted out in the manner of slave ships for the large number of expected deportees, to carry Acadians wherever the British authorities might choose to send them."

Despite their close contacts with the British Crown, Thomas Hancock also supplemented his regular businesses by smuggling goods such as tea, paper, and sailcloth from the Dutch Republic and molasses from the West Indies into New England. In British America, smuggling was largely perceived by the general public as being a victimless crime, and smugglers frequently enjoyed considerable community support from government crackdowns. Hancock's smuggling businesses were continued by John, a venture which played a role in fomenting the American Revolution.

== Later life and death ==
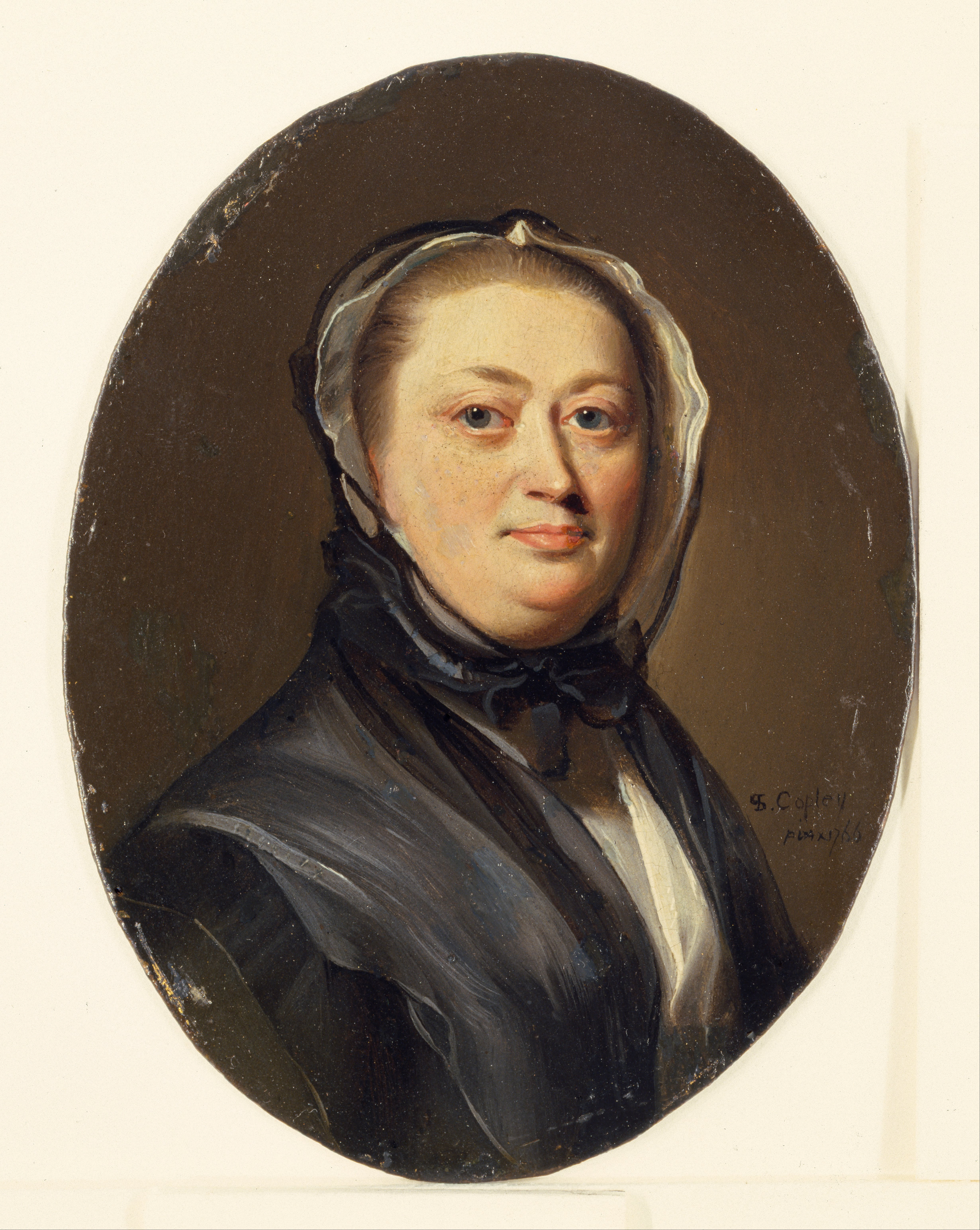
1766 portrait of Hancock's wife Lydia by John Singleton Copley

In 1752, Thomas Hancock finally made a formal entrance into Massachusetts politics, taking a seat in the Governor's Council, though he "was not among its more active members." When Apthorp died in 1758, Thomas Hancock assumed total control over his deceased partner's assets, increasing his extensive wealth which was further bolstered when Daniel died in 1761 and the Henchman family properties also passed into Thomas Hancock's control as well.

In 1760, Thomas Hancock sold a Lexington mansion he owned to clergyman Jonas Clarke for 476 Massachusetts pounds, having inherited it in his father's last will and testament. Thomas Hancock also sold the surrounding farmland to Clarke, which became the clergyman's main form of income. The Clarke family was related to the Hancock family by marriage, and John Hancock later took refuge in the house during the battles of Lexington and Concord.

Throughout his later years, Thomas Hancock started to suffer from gout and a nervous disorder, which led him to turn over control over the majority of his business affairs to his nephew, who had effectively been adopted. His mercantile interests had led Thomas Hancock to acquire a wealth of over roughly 70,000 pounds, one of the largest fortunes in the New England Colonies; they had also made him one of the richest and best-known residents in Boston.

In 1764, the Parliament of Great Britain passed the Sugar Act to raise taxes from its American colonies. Thomas Hancock was infuriated about the act, believing it was oppressive to American businessmen; he complained to a business colleague in England that "we are worth Saving in this part of the world." In the same year, he commissioned a portrait of himself by painter John Singleton Copley, 34 years after commissioning one from John Smibert.

On August 1, 1764, Thomas Hancock suffered a stroke while entering the council chamber and died on the same day. His last will and testament deeded all properties owned by the House of Hancock to John Hancock, while Hancock Manor and his slaves went to Lydia. Included with these inheritances were thousands of acres of real estate in Eastern Massachusetts, rapidly transforming John Hancock into one of the wealthiest men in the Thirteen Colonies.

== Legacy ==
After Thomas Hancock died, John gradually took less interest in the business interests of the House of Hancock, leaving the day-to-day administration of its affairs to Ezekiel Price, the secretary of the Boston branch of the Sons of Liberty. In 1771, John Hancock and Lydia were so wealthy to the point where they had 21,000 pounds combined in Massachusetts pounds (approximately 15,000 British pounds) on loan at interest. When Lydia died in 1771, she willed Hancock Manor and the household slaves she had inherited from her husband to John Hancock, as she died childless.

During this period, John Hancock become one of the leading figures of colonial resistance to British policies; as historian William Pencak noted, "ironically, he spent much of his inherited fortune funding resistance to British authority, thereby undermining the imperial connection that had been its source." The household slaves continued to be owned by John Hancock, though they were eventually emancipated through the terms of Thomas Hancock's last will and testament; Cato and his wife, the last who remained enslaved, were emancipated by John Hancock in the 1770s.

When the American Revolutionary War broke out, the mansion that Thomas Hancock had built for himself was pillaged by British Army soldiers during the battles of Lexington and Concord. It was subsequently occupied by British general Sir Henry Clinton and his field staff, for whom it served as a temporary place of residence in 1775. However, the mansion was left largely intact by the British (Clinton having ensured that it was scrupulously cared for) and John Hancock subsequently moved back in after they departed, using it to entertain numerous socially prominent guests.

Hancock Manor continued to serve as a place of residence for John Hancock, including when he served as the governor of Massachusetts, until he died in 1793, after which the Boston municipal government purchased most of his estate (including Hancock Manor) for 4,000 pounds. The mansion continued to stand until 1863, when two Boston businessmen demolished the house as part of a redevelopment project. This, as noted by writer Edwin M. Bacon, led to a public outcry and spurred a historic preservation movement to preserve remaining colonial-era buildings in Boston.

== See also ==
- Ebenezer Hancock House, built on land willed by Thomas
