= Samuel Gerrish =

American bookseller and publisher

- Born: 1680s
- Died: 1741
- Occupations: bookseller and publisher

Samuel Gerrish (c. 1680 – c. 1741) was an American bookseller and publisher based in Boston during the 18th century. He kept a shop "near the brick meeting house in Cornhill," and published works by Thomas Prince and others. Employees included Thomas Hancock.

== Family ==
He married Mary Sewall (daughter of Samuel Sewall) in 1709; children included Samuel Gerrish (d.1751).

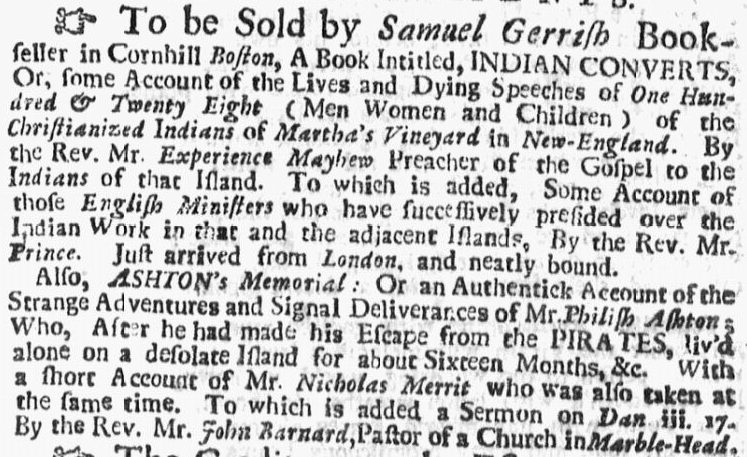
Advertisement for Samuel Gerrish, bookseller, Boston, 1727

== See also ==
- List of booksellers in Boston
