= Hancock Cemetery =

Historic cemetery in Massachusetts, United States

- U.S. National Register of Historic Places
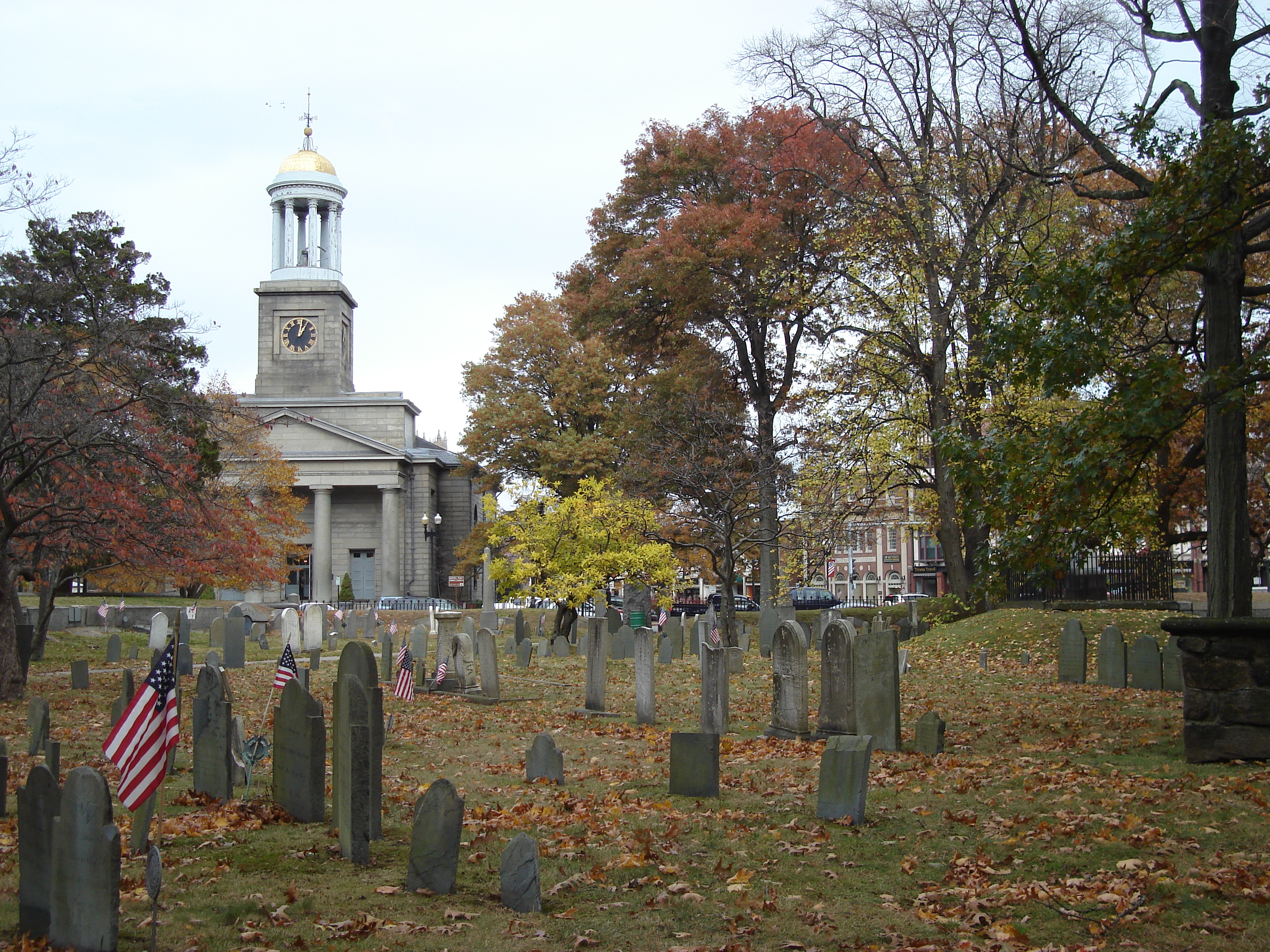
- Stones in the cemetery

- Location within Massachusetts Location within the United States
- Location: Hancock St. in Quincy Sq., Quincy, Massachusetts
- Coordinates: 42°15′1″N 71°0′14″W
- Area: 2 acres (0.81 ha)
- Built: 1640
- NRHP reference No.: 82004421
- Added to NRHP: January 28, 1982

Hancock Cemetery is a historic cemetery on the Hancock Adams Common, across from the United First Parish Church, in Quincy, Massachusetts, United States. It is named after Reverend John Hancock Jr. (1702–1744), father of Founding Father John Hancock.

The cemetery was founded c. 1640 (the date of the earliest documented graves), and is the only tangible remainder of the early settlement of the area. It was the burial place of Presidents John Adams and John Quincy Adams and their wives, Abigail Adams and Louisa Adams (respectively), before they were moved to the crypt in the United First Parish Church. The cemetery was listed on the National Register of Historic Places in 1982.

== Gallery ==
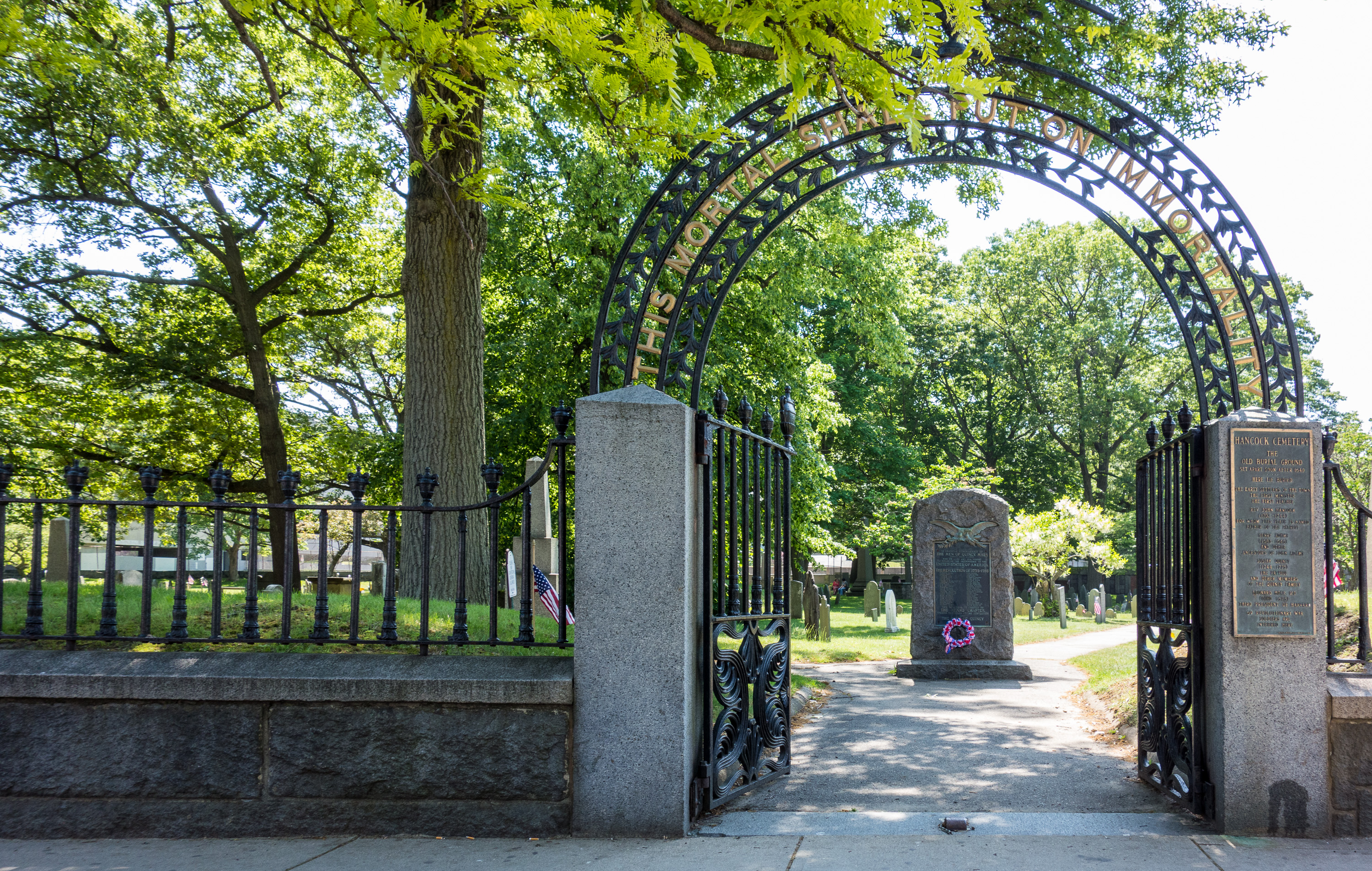
Entrance Gate

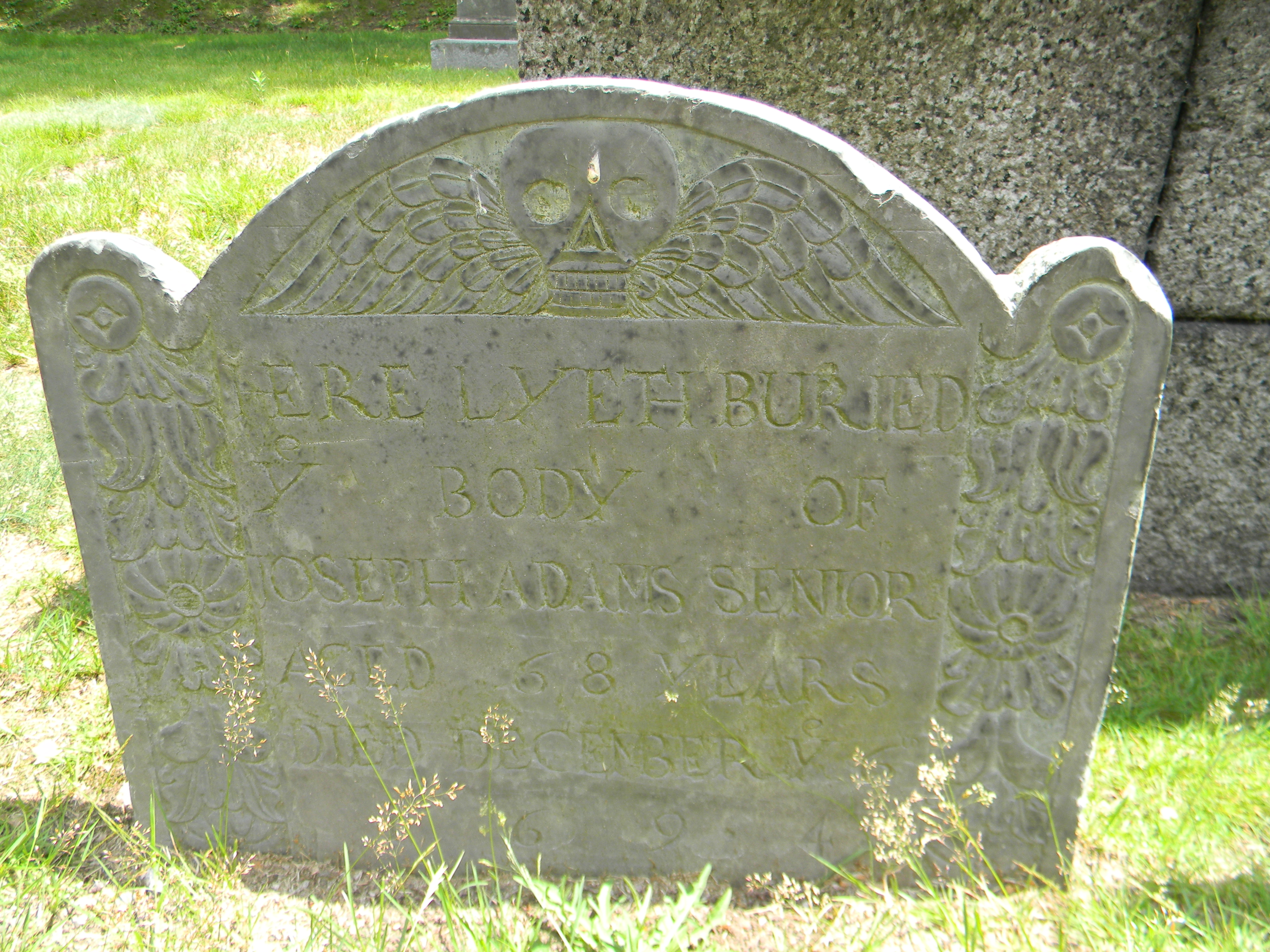
Joseph Adams, Sr. headstone, 2015

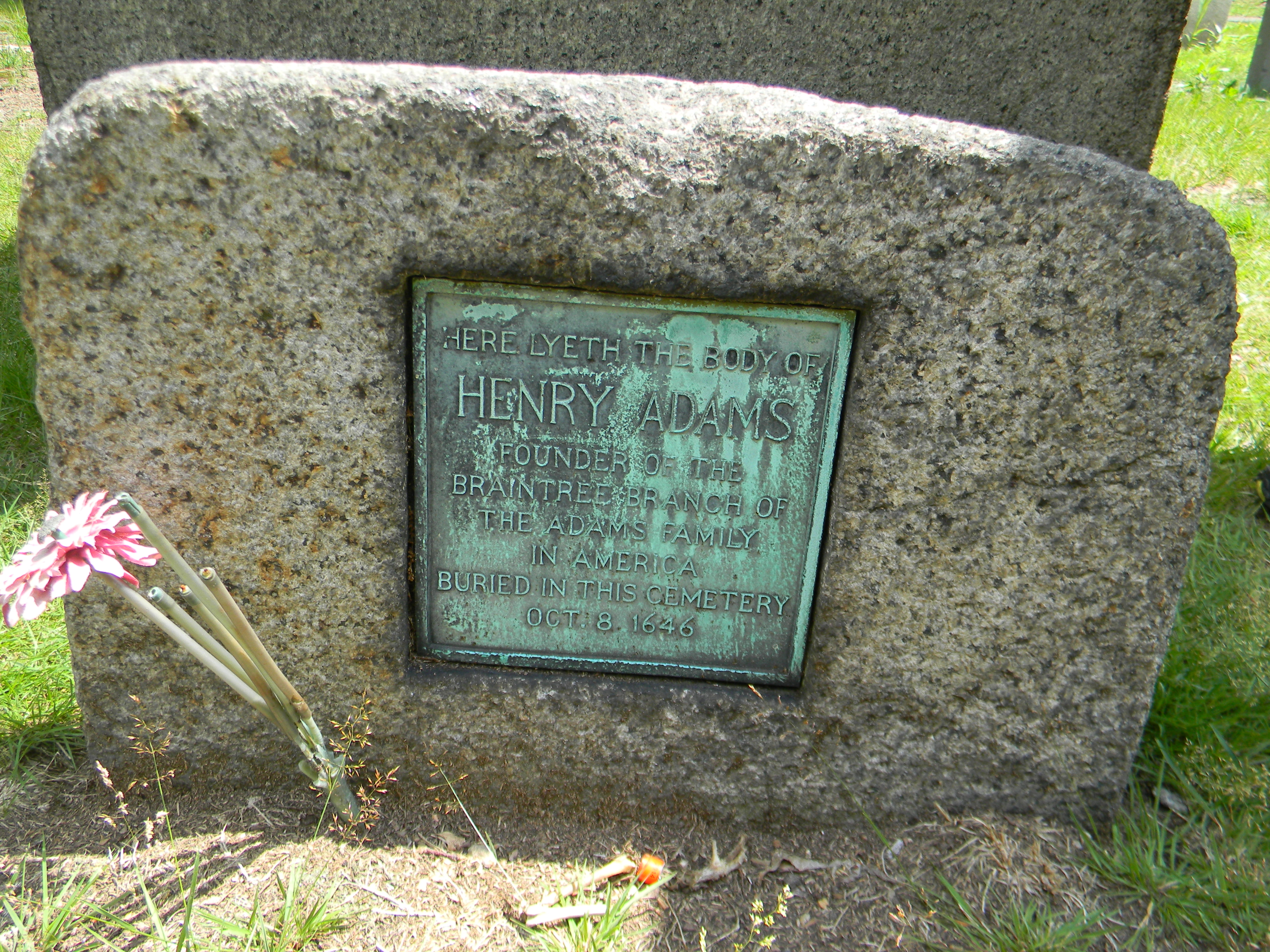
Henry Adams headstone, 2015

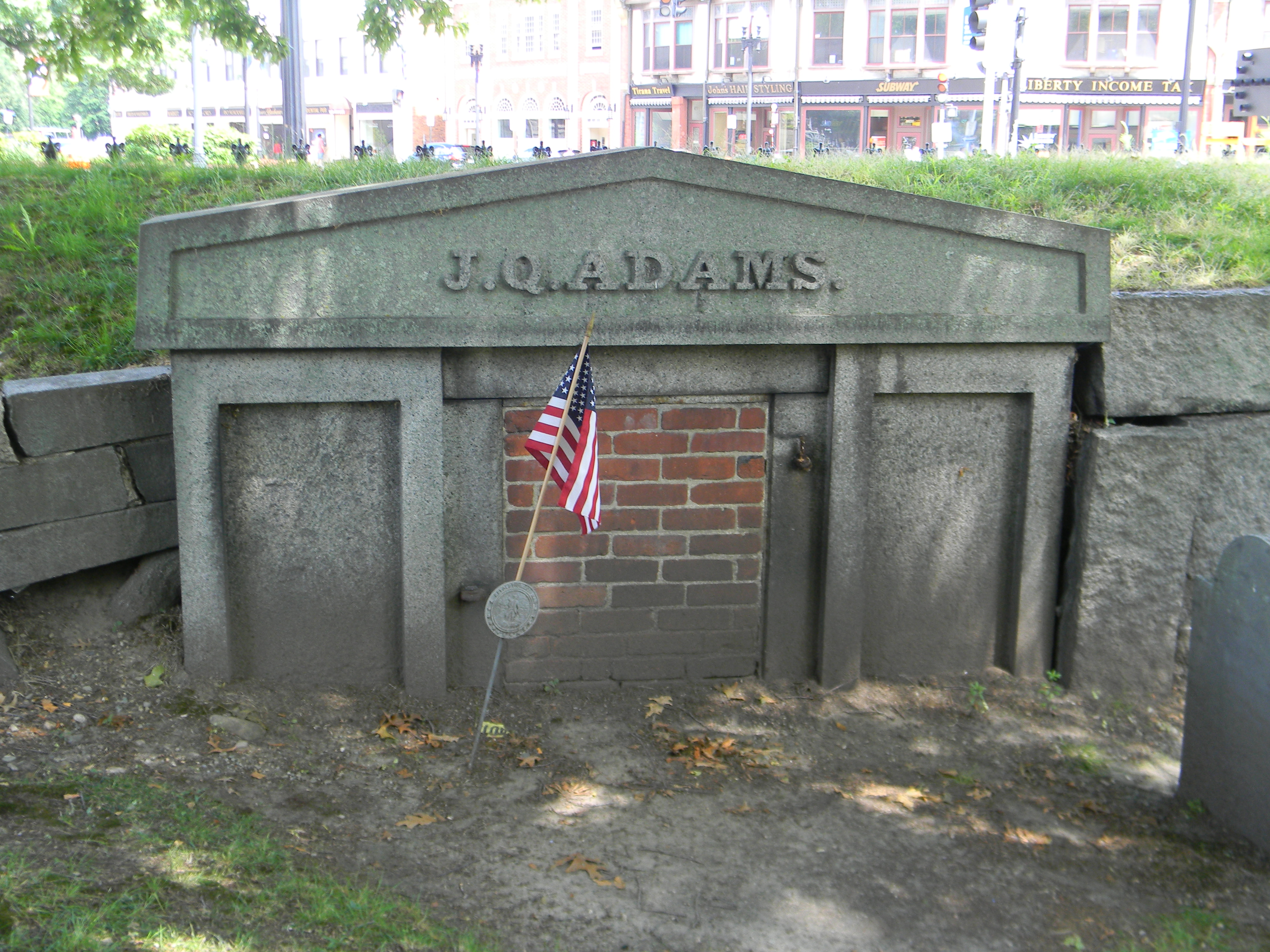
John Quincy Adams' original burial site, 2015

== See also ==
- National Register of Historic Places listings in Quincy, Massachusetts
