= John Handcock =

John Handcock may refer to:

- John Gustavus Handcock (1720–1766), Irish MP for Ballyshannon
- John Handcock (Philipstown MP) (1755–1786), Irish politician and soldier

== See also ==
- John Hancock (disambiguation)
