= Pine tree shilling =

Historic unit of currency

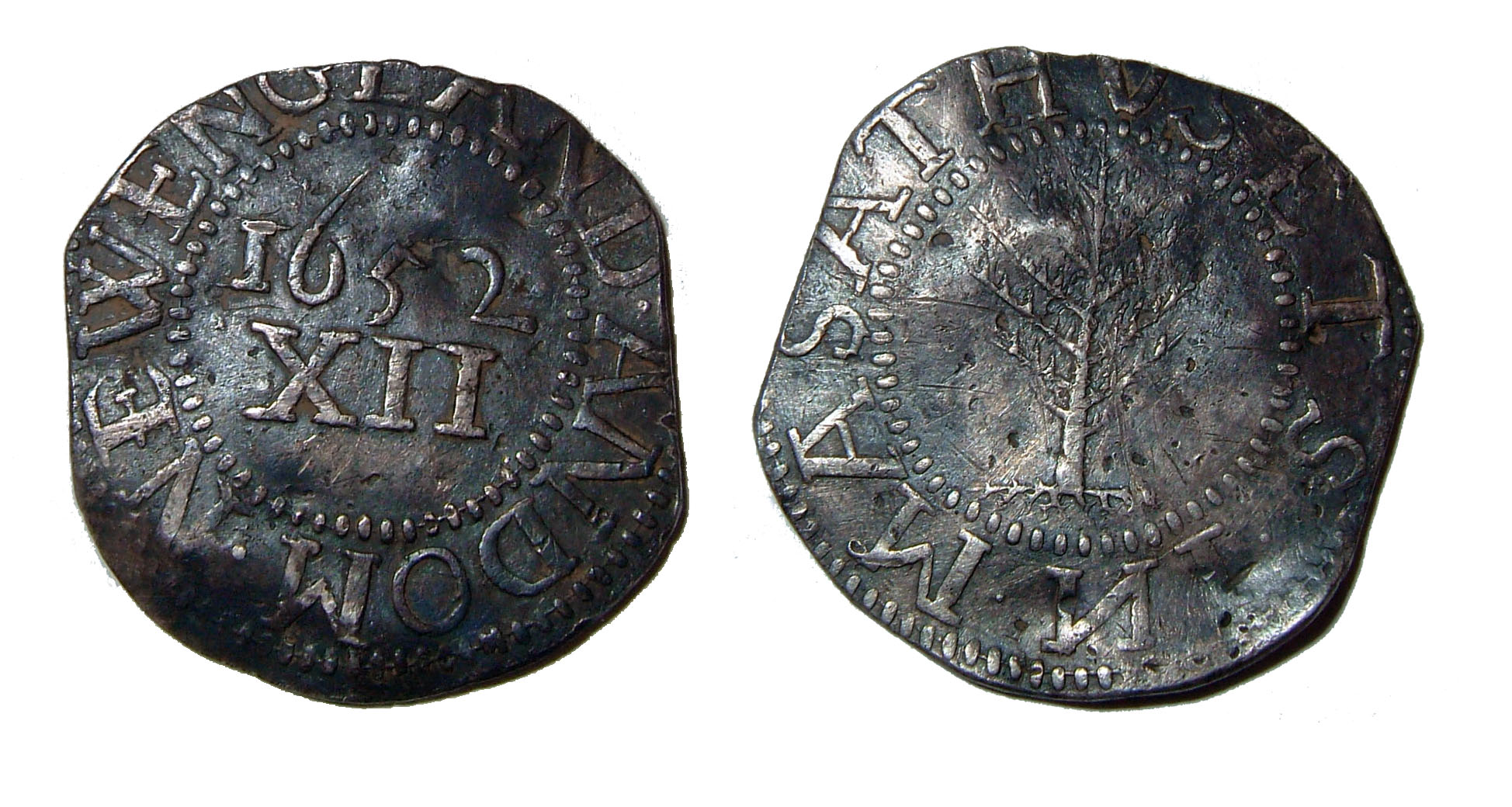
1652 pine tree shilling

The pine tree shilling was a type of coin minted and circulated throughout the Thirteen Colonies.

In 1652, the Massachusetts Bay Colony authorized Boston silversmiths John Hull and Robert Sanderson to mint coinage. Prior to 1652, the Massachusetts financial system was based on bartering and foreign coinage. The scarcity of coin currency was a problem for the growth of the New England economy. On May 27, 1652, the Massachusetts General Court appointed John Hull, a local silversmith, to be Boston's mint master without notifying or seeking permission from the English government.

Coins were issued in denominations of 3 and 6 pence and 1 shilling. The first pieces bore the letters "NE" and the denomination "III", "VI" or "XII". The coins were smaller than the equivalent sterling coins by 22.5%. According to an October 1676 report by Edward Randolph, the unusual sizing was a deliberate decision to be incompatible with the pound sterling so that the money would be less likely to be exported because hard currency was rare in New England.

Later pieces, struck between 1652 and 1660 or 1662, bore the image of a willow tree, with an oak tree appearing on coins produced between 1660 or 1662 and c. 1667. However, the most famous design was the final one to be issued, the pine tree type, struck between c. 1667 and 1682. The coins circulated widely inside North America and the Caribbean.

The pine tree shillings nearly all bore the date "1652". This was the date of the Massachusetts Bay Colony legislation sanctioning the production of shillings by the "Hull Mint" operated by John Hull and Robert Sanderson (two Massachusetts settlers and business partners). The image of the pine tree on the later coins is thought to represent the export of tall timber, used for the mainmasts of Royal Navy ships amongst other uses. The implication of respect owed to the colonies as the source of this vital war material would become sharper with the Pine Tree Flag flown during the American Revolution. The mint was shut down by the English government in 1682 and the Colony's charter was revoked two years later by Charles II on the advice of his colonial administrator Edward Randolph.

== See also ==
- Early American currency
- Massachusetts pound
