= Massachusetts pound =

Currency of Massachusetts until 1793

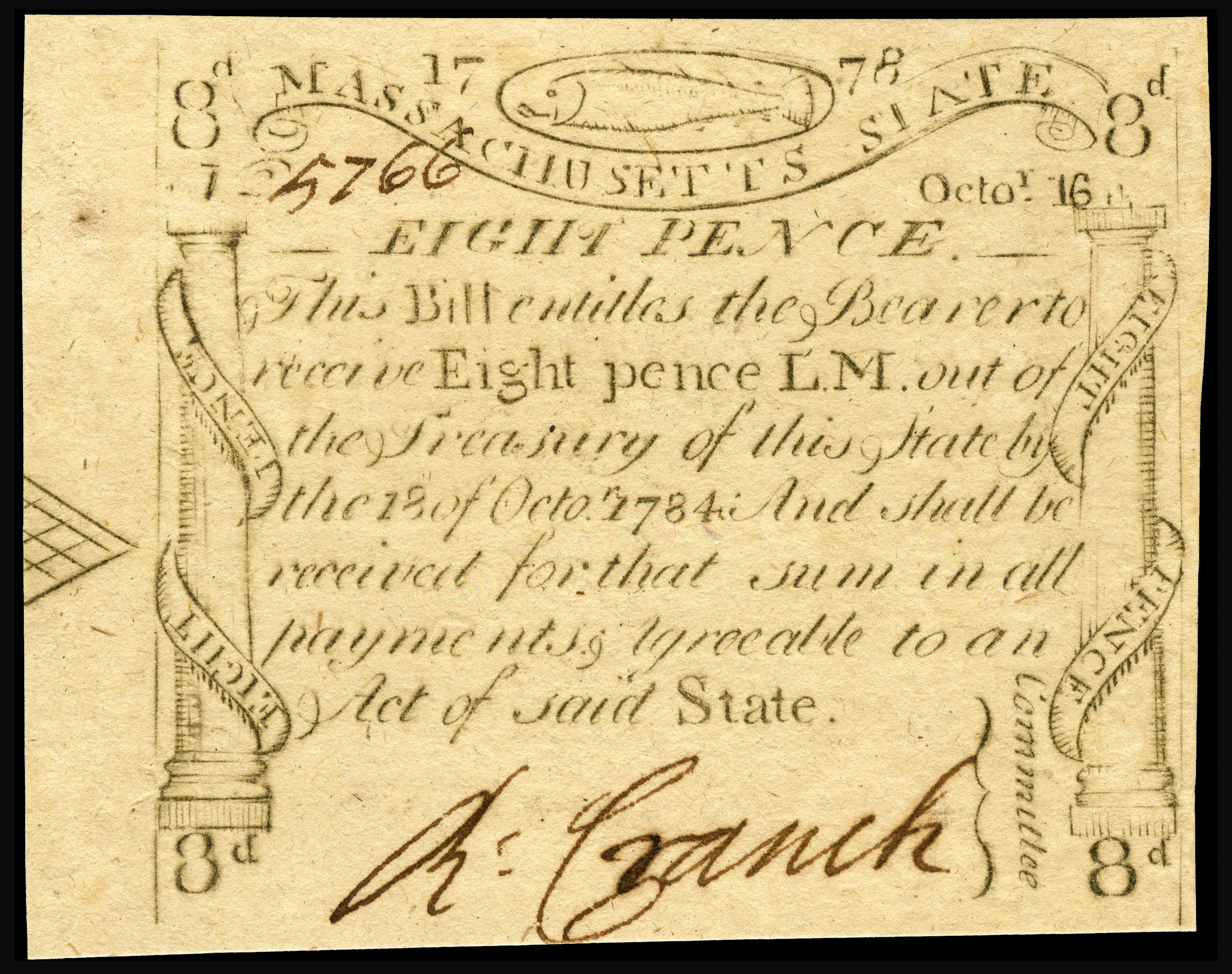
An 8d note in Massachusetts state currency, issued in 1778. These "codfish" bills, so-called because of the cod in the border design, were engraved and printed by Paul Revere.

The pound was the currency of the Commonwealth of Massachusetts and its colonial predecessors until 1793. The Massachusetts pound used the £sd currency system of 1 pound divided into 20 shillings, each of 12 pence. Initially, sterling coin and foreign currencies circulated in Massachusetts, supplemented by pine tree shillings produced by John Hull between 1652 and 1682 and by local paper money as of 1690.

The paper money issued in colonial Massachusetts was denominated in £sd, although it was worth less than sterling. Initially, six shillings were equal to one Spanish dollar. After years of high inflation, in 1749 Massachusetts withdrew its paper money from circulation and returned to specie.

Massachusetts resumed issuing paper money after the American Revolutionary War began in 1775. The state currency depreciated greatly and was replaced by the U.S. dollar in 1793.

== Coins ==
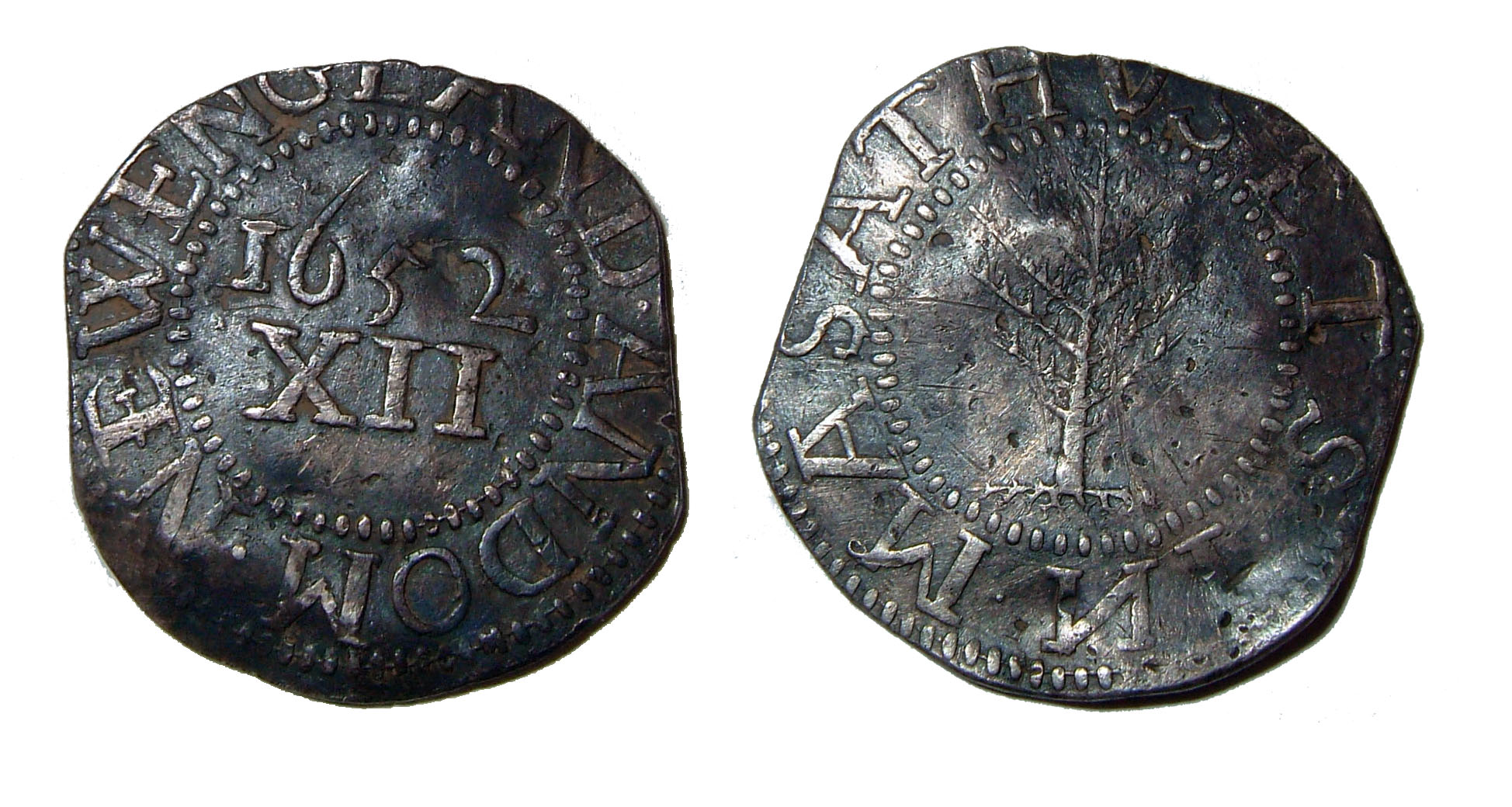
Silver pine tree shilling, dated 1652

Shillings were issued in denominations of 3 and 6 pence and 1 shilling. The first pieces bore the letters "NE" and the denomination "III", "VI" or "XII". The coins (the pine tree shillings) were smaller than the equivalent sterling coins by 22.5%. Later pieces, struck between 1652 and 1660 or 1662, bore the image of a willow tree, with an oak tree appearing on coins produced between 1660 or 1662 and c. 1667. However, the most famous design was the final one to be issued, the pine tree type, struck between c. 1667 and 1682. The coins circulated widely in North America and the Caribbean.

The shillings nearly all bore the date "1652". This was the date of the Massachusetts Bay Colony legislation sanctioning the production of shillings. The date was maintained by the Massachusetts moneyers in order to appear to be in compliance with English law that reserved the right of produce shillings to the Crown, since, in 1652, England was a Commonwealth (King Charles I having been beheaded three years previously). The shillings were struck by John Hull and Robert Sanderson, two Massachusetts settlers. The image of the pine tree on the later coins may symbolize an important export for Massachusetts - pine trees for ships' masts. The "Hull Mint" producing the pine tree shillings was closed by the English government in 1682.

=== Cent production ===
==== Copper cents ====
In 1787, Captain Joshua Witherle was appointed the Master of the Mint and he built a small building in his Boston backyard to use as the mint house. He then built a rolling mill at the fourth privilege along Mother Brook in Dedham. He took copper, primarily melted down from the Revolutionary War-era cannons and mortars, and cast it into ingots. They were then taken to Dedham, where they were rolled into plates and then returned to Boston. The plates were struck in Boston and stamped into one cent coins.

Witherle had told the Commonwealth that he was "ready... immediately to proceed" in May 1787, he still had not produced a single coin by January 1788. When the Governor's Council called him in to explain himself, he told them that there was difficulty getting the appropriate materials and training workers in an industry never before attempted in this area.

There was only a small number of coins ever produced there and, in January 1789, Witherle was dismissed. Then, when the U.S. Constitution was adopted in June 1788, it established a national currency and mint, making state efforts moot.

== Paper money ==
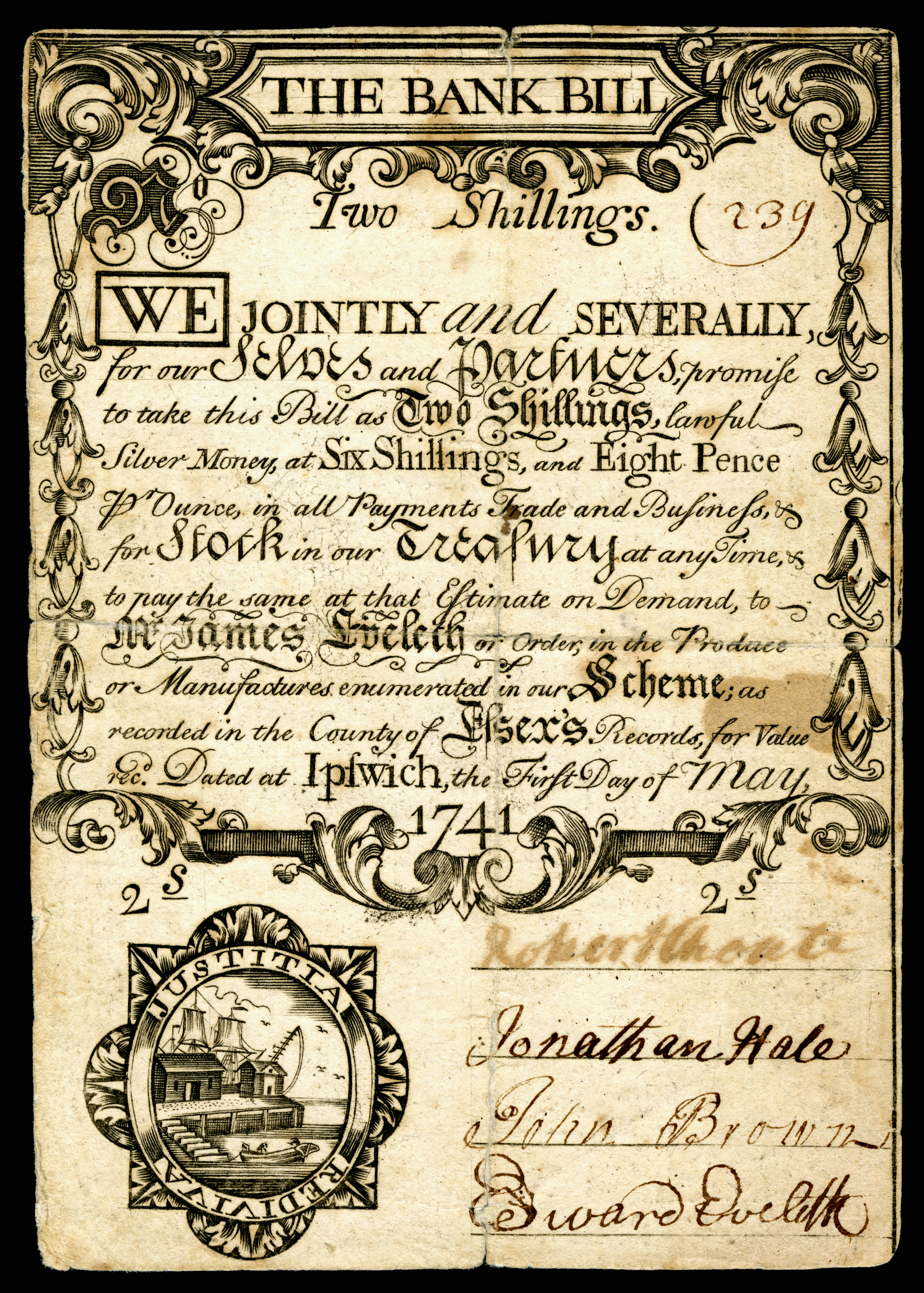
Two-shilling note, dated May 1, 1741

Starting on December 10, 1690, paper money was issued, denominated in £sd. The notes were printed from engraved copper plates (probably the work of silversmith Jeremiah Dummer). The earliest known note was printed on February 13, 1691, with the date of "Feb. 3, 1690" based on the "old style" English calendar, but the note may have been altered.

The pine tree shillings were initially worth 9d sterling. However, the value of this first issue of notes declined relative to silver coins and, in 1704, the "Old Tenor" notes were introduced, again at a value of 1 Massachusetts shilling = 9d sterling. The value of these notes also declined and they were followed, in 1737, by the "Middle Tenor" issue, worth 3 times the Old Tenor notes, and, in 1741, by the "New Tenor" issue, worth 4 times the Old Tenor notes. In 1759, all previous issues were replaced by the "Colonial" issue, worth 10 times the Old Tenor notes.

== Works cited ==
- Neiswander, Judith (2024). Mother Brook and the Mills of East Dedham. Damianos Publishing. ISBN 978-1-941573-66-2.
