= John Hancock (rugby) =

England international rugby union & league player (1932-2011)

- Full name: William Jack Henry Hancock
- Born: 26 September 1932 Newport, Wales
- Died: 16 November 2011 (aged 79)
- Height: 6 ft 2 in (1.88 m)

Rugby union career
- Position: Lock
International career
Years	Team	Apps	(Points)
1955	England	2	(0)
- Rugby league career

Playing information
Club
Years	Team	Pld	T	G	FG	P
1955–63	Salford	128	2	15	0	36

William Jack Henry Hancock (26 September 1932 – 16 November 2011) was an English rugby footballer.

Hancock was born in Newport, Wales, to English parents.

A rugby union lock, Hancock excelled in line-outs and was capped twice for England in the 1955 Five Nations, playing away fixtures against Wales and Ireland. He had previously committed to England by declining a Wales trial.

Hancock signed to play rugby league for the Salford midway through 1955.

== See also ==
- List of England national rugby union players
