= John Hancock Sr. =

American clergyman and politician

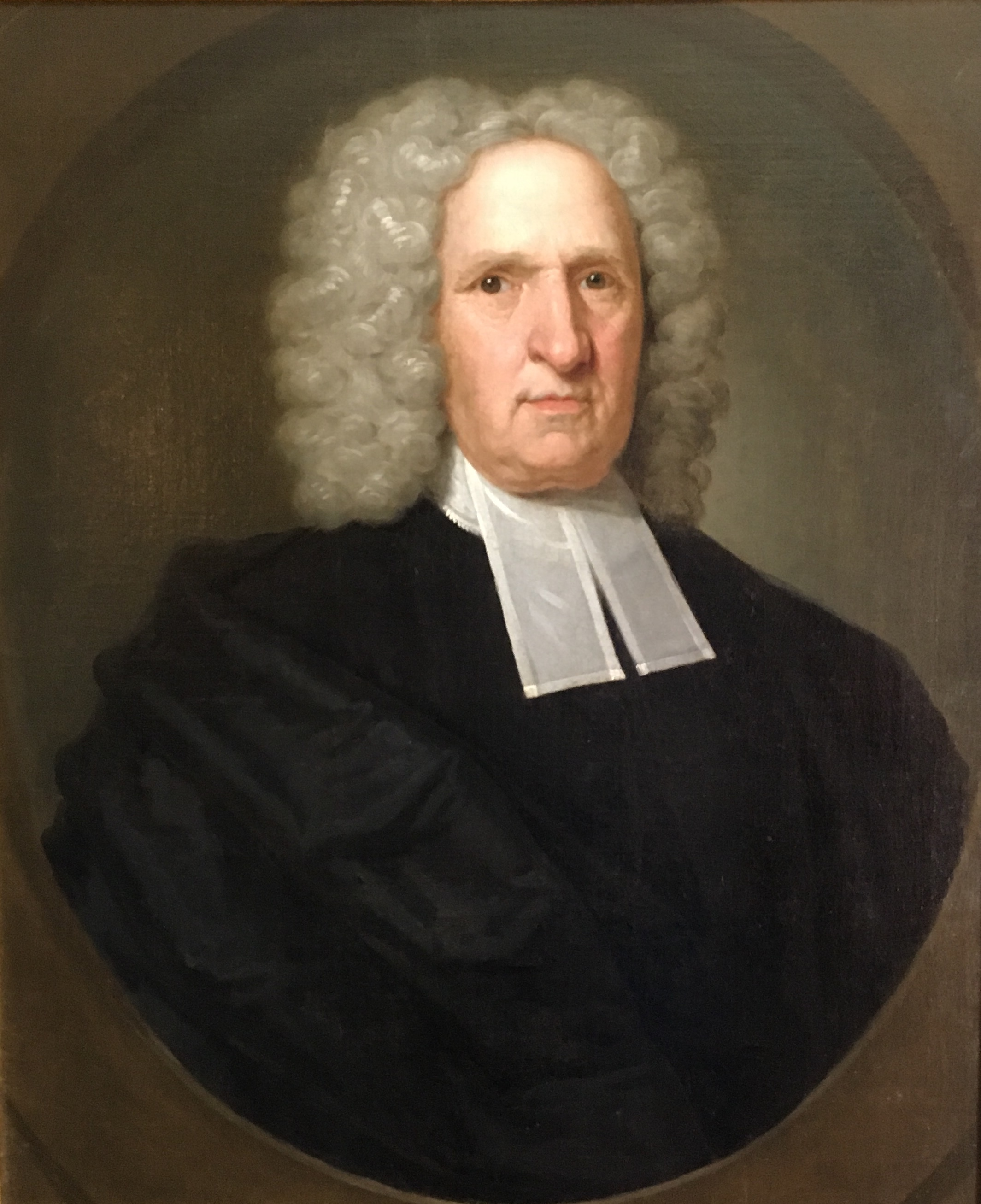
- Portrait by John Smibert
- Born: March 1, 1671; Cambridge, Massachusetts
- Died: December 6, 1752 (aged 81); Lexington, Massachusetts
- Resting place: Old Burying Ground, Lexington
- Occupations: Clergyman, politician
- Title: Colonel
- Spouse: Elizabeth Clark
- Children: John Hancock Jr. Thomas Hancock
- Relatives: John Hancock (grandson)

John Hancock Sr. (March 1, 1671 – December 6, 1752) was an American clergyman and politician who was the paternal grandfather of John Hancock, one of the Founding Father of the United States. Hancock graduated from Harvard College in 1689 and was ordained that year. He taught at the Grammar School at Cambridge, Massachusetts starting in 1691. In 1692 he was engaged as the preacher at Medford, Massachusetts, where he lived and served until November 1693. He was invited to preach at Lexington, Massachusetts in 1697, and remained the pastor there for 55 years, until his death in 1752.
His sons:

- Col. John Hancock Jr. (1702–1744), was also a minister and was father of the politician John Hancock.
- Thomas Hancock (1703–1764) was a merchant in Boston who built the Hancock–Clarke House for his father.

On 22 April 1728, Isaac Powers of Littleton, Massachusetts sold an enslaved boy named Jack to Hancock. He is buried at the Old Burying Ground in Lexington, Massachusetts.
