= John Hancock Jr. =

American priest and librarian

- Born: June 1, 1702; Lexington, Massachusetts, British America
- Died: May 7, 1744 (aged 41); Quincy, Massachusetts, British America
- Burial place: Hancock Cemetery, Quincy, Massachusetts
- Occupations: Clergyman, Soldier, Planter, Politician
- Title: Colonel
- Spouse: Mary Hawke Thaxter
- Children: John Hancock; Ebenezer Hancock
- Parent(s): John Hancock Sr. Elizabeth Clark

Reverend Colonel John Hancock Jr. (June 1, 1702 – May 7, 1744) was a colonial American clergyman, soldier, planter, politician. He was father of politician John Hancock. Hancock was born in Lexington, Massachusetts, and was a son of Colonel John Hancock Sr. and Elizabeth Clark. The Hancock Cemetery is named after him.

== Biography ==
Hancock graduated from Harvard College in 1719 and served as a librarian there from 1723 to 1726. He was ordained on November 2, 1726, and settled in Quincy, Massachusetts, as pastor of United First Parish Church, Quincy, Massachusetts until his death. He also owned one household slave.

He died when his sons Ebenezer and John were two and seven years old, respectively. Soon after, their mother sent him to live with their uncle, Thomas Hancock. John Hancock Jr. was buried at the Hancock Cemetery in Quincy, which was named in his honor.
