= Town Hill District =

Historic district in Massachusetts, United States

- U.S. National Register of Historic Places
- U.S. Historic district
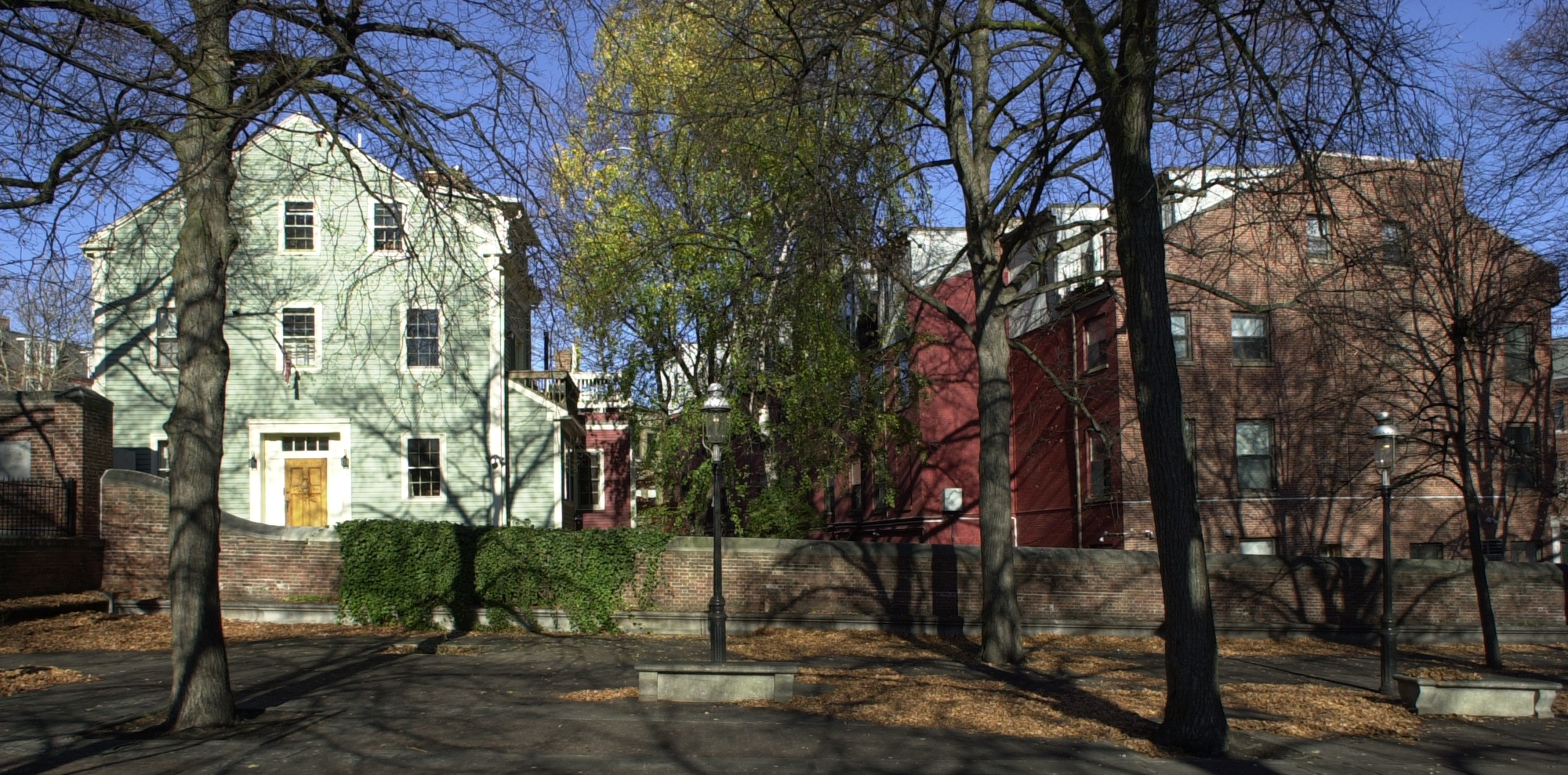

- Location within Boston Location within Massachusetts Location within the United States
- Location: Bounded roughly by Rutherford Ave. and Main and Warren Sts., Boston, Massachusetts
- Coordinates: 42°22′22″N 71°3′45″W
- Area: 11 acres (4.5 ha)
- Architect: Multiple
- Architectural style: Mid 19th Century Revival, Georgian, Federal
- NRHP reference No.: 73000850
- Added to NRHP: May 11, 1973

The Town Hill District is a historic district bounded roughly by Rutherford Avenue and Main and Warren Streets in the Charlestown neighborhood of Boston, Massachusetts.

Town Hill was laid out by Charlestown engineer Thomas Graves in 1629 and was the site of Boston's first settlement. The unique elliptical street plan forms a tightly delineated neighborhood that survives to this day, one of the few colonial aspects to have survived. City Square (then known as Market Square) is the focus of the neighborhood, historically having been a market as well as the seat of government.

During the 18th century, Market Square was paved and other important town institutions, including a courthouse and meeting-house, were built in the district. On April 18, 1775, Paul Revere, on the night of his famous ride, rowed to Charlestown from Boston. Here, he borrowed a horse and departed to sound his warning of British troops on the march all the way to Lexington and Concord.

Town Hill is composed of residential and commercial structures dating from as early as 1780, when Charlestown was burned to the ground by the British during the Battle of Bunker Hill in 1775. Rebuilt after the revolution, the square, then known as Charlestown Square, regained its role as the center of town life. As the 19th century progressed, the square became a crossroads as bridges and grand hotels were built and wharves crowded the waterfront. Most of the buildings are constructed of natural materials including brick, wood, and stone.

The district was added to the National Register of Historic Places in 1973. This district is currently under study for landmark status by the Boston Landmarks Commission.

== Gallery ==
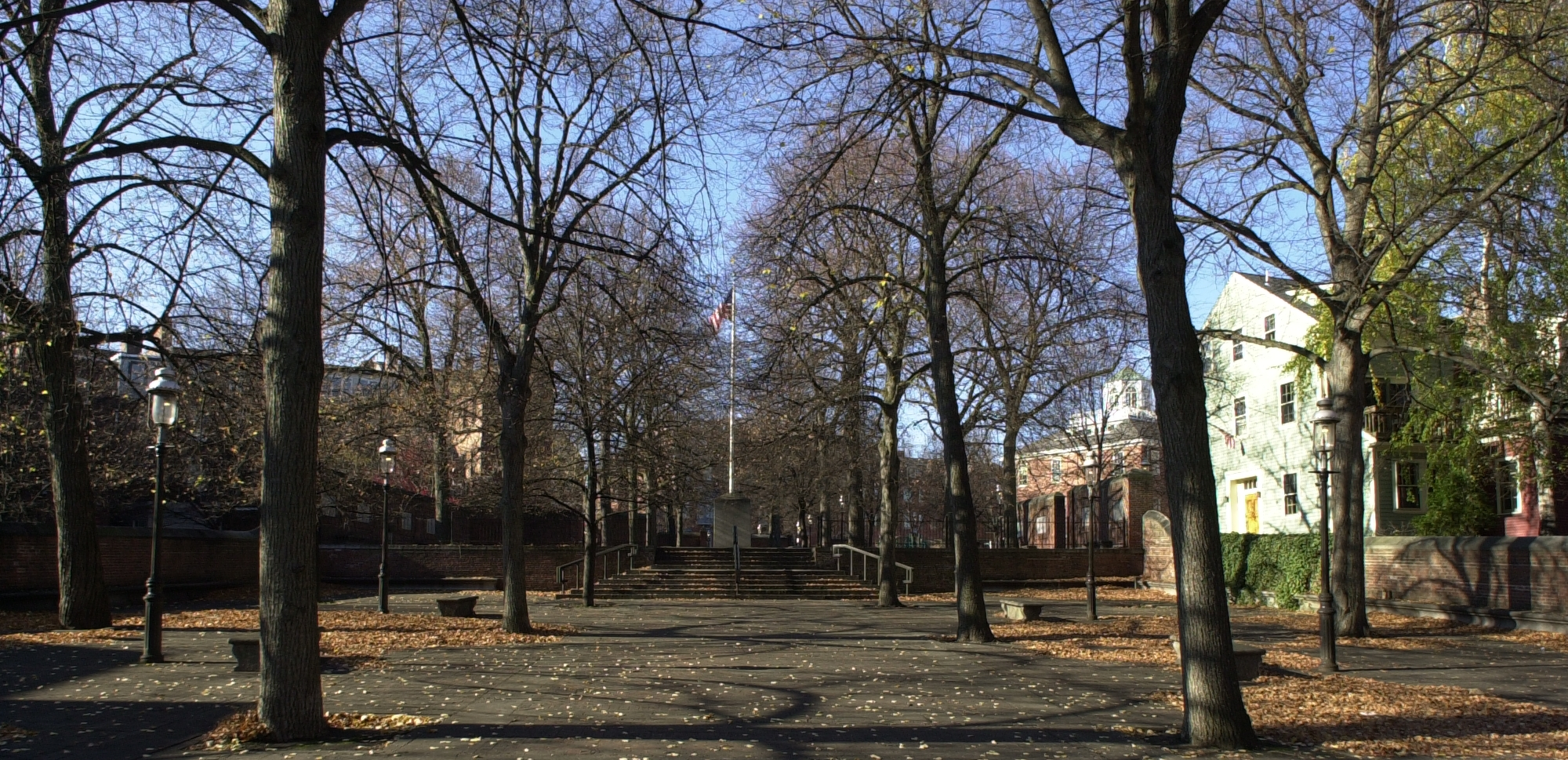

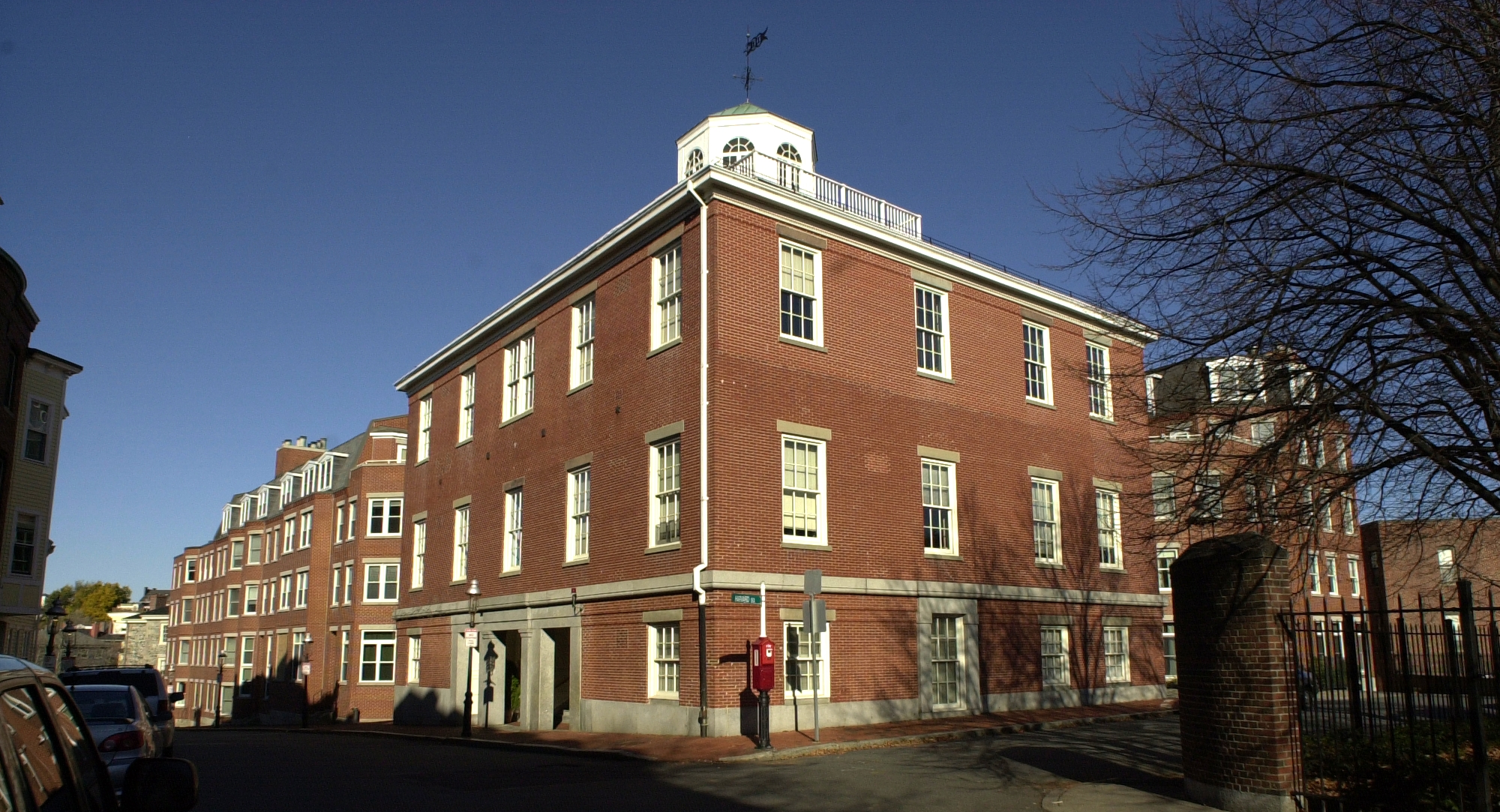

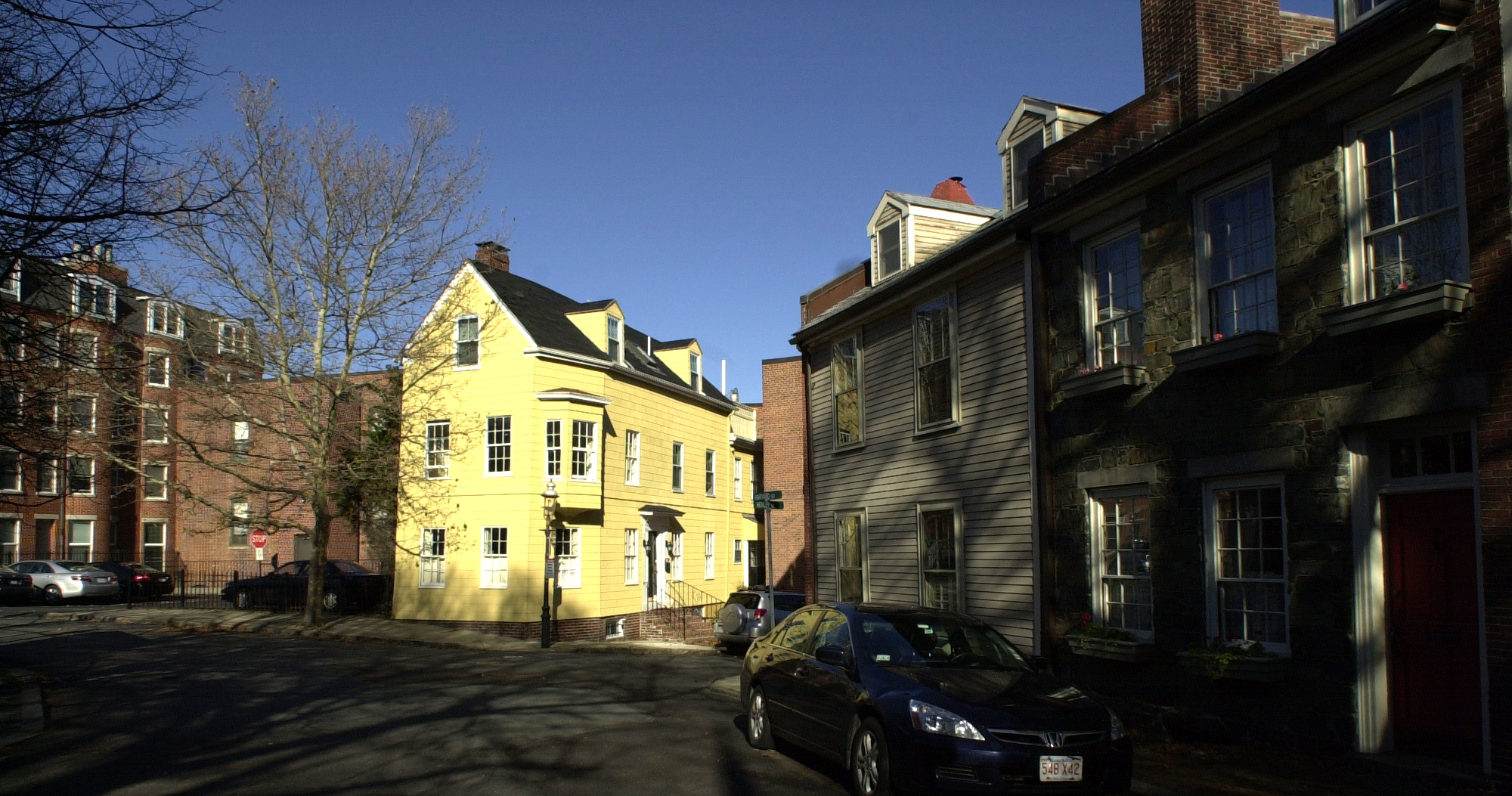

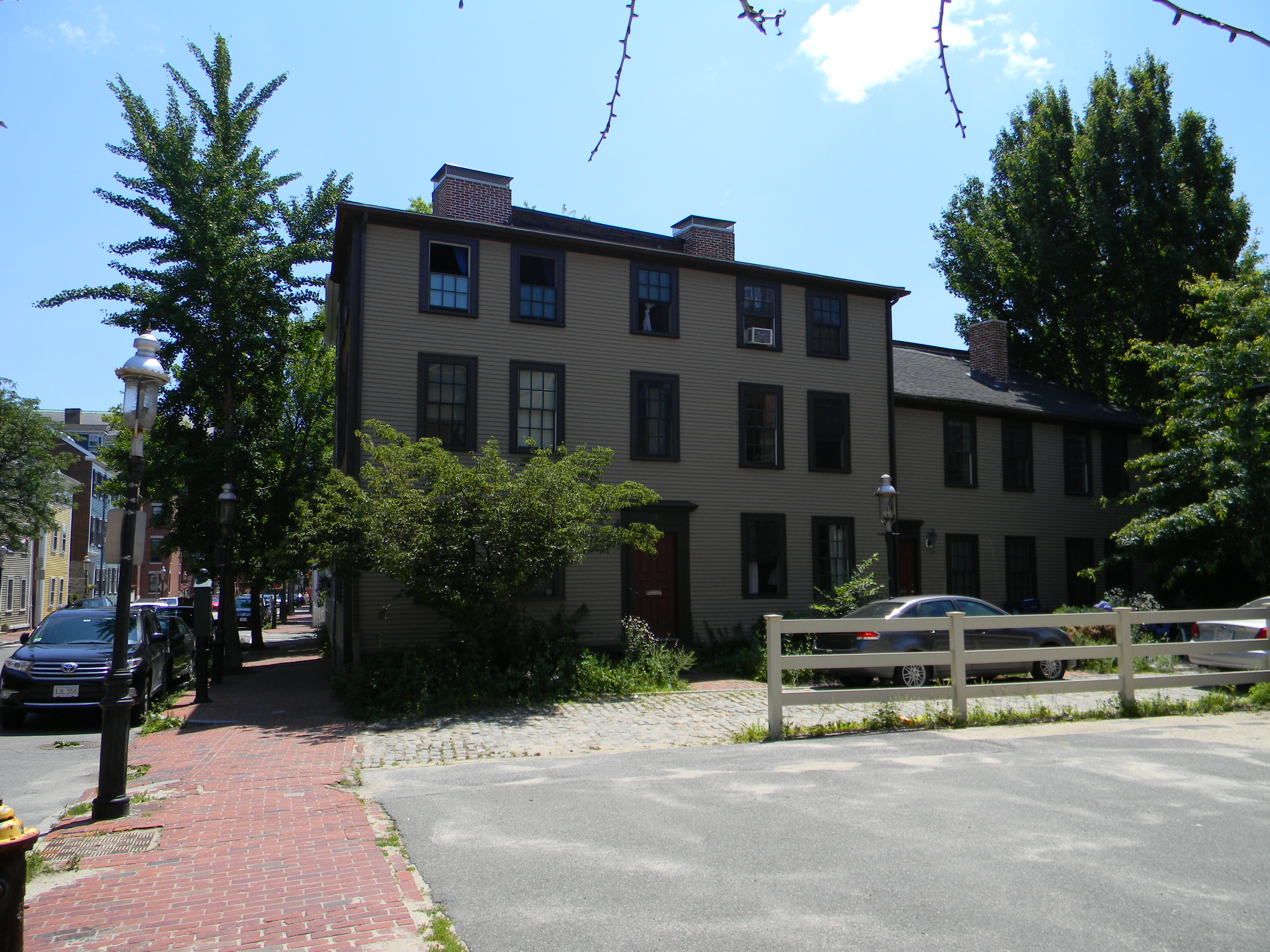
Timothy Thompson House, 2015

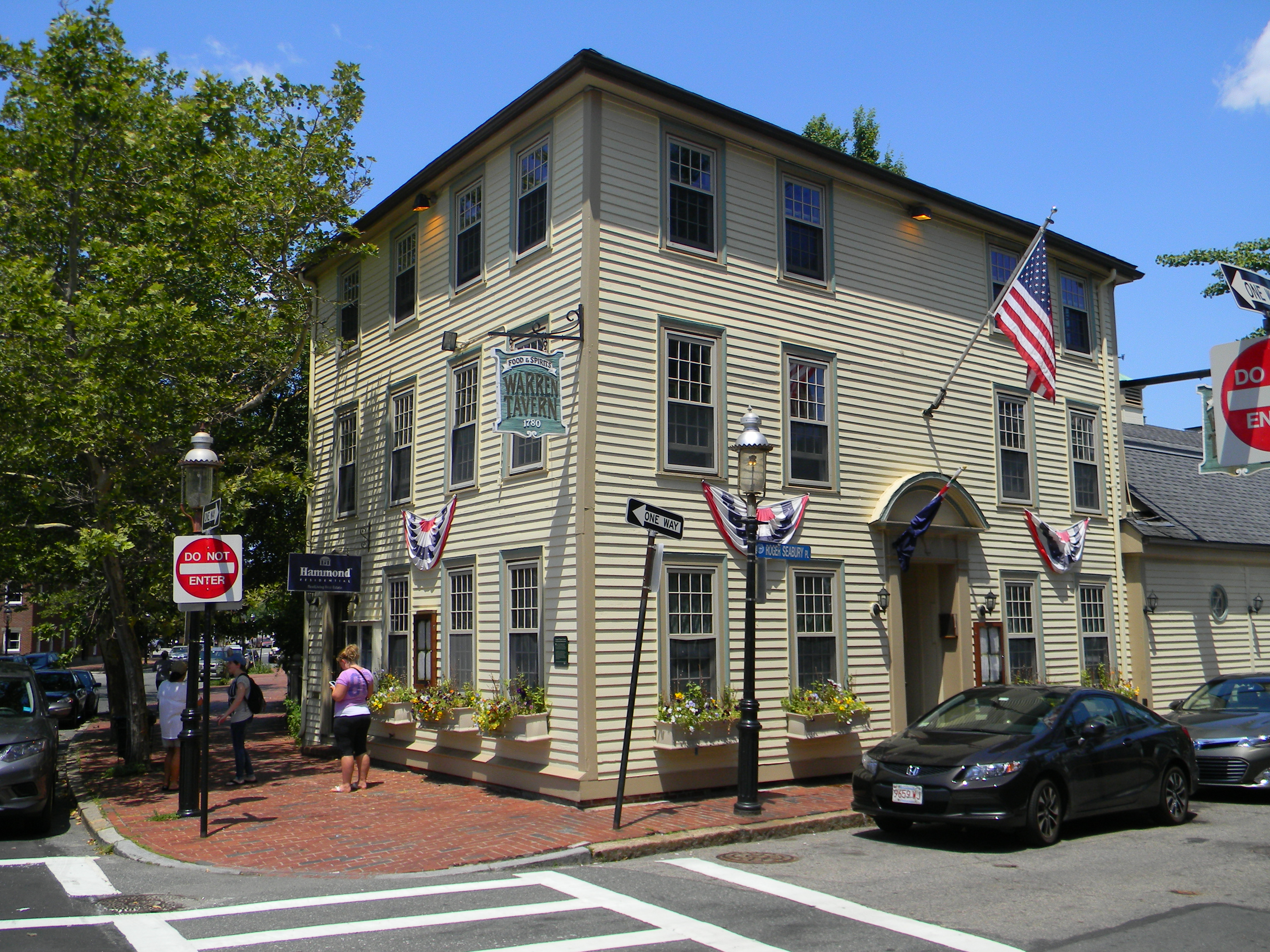
General Warren Tavern, 2015

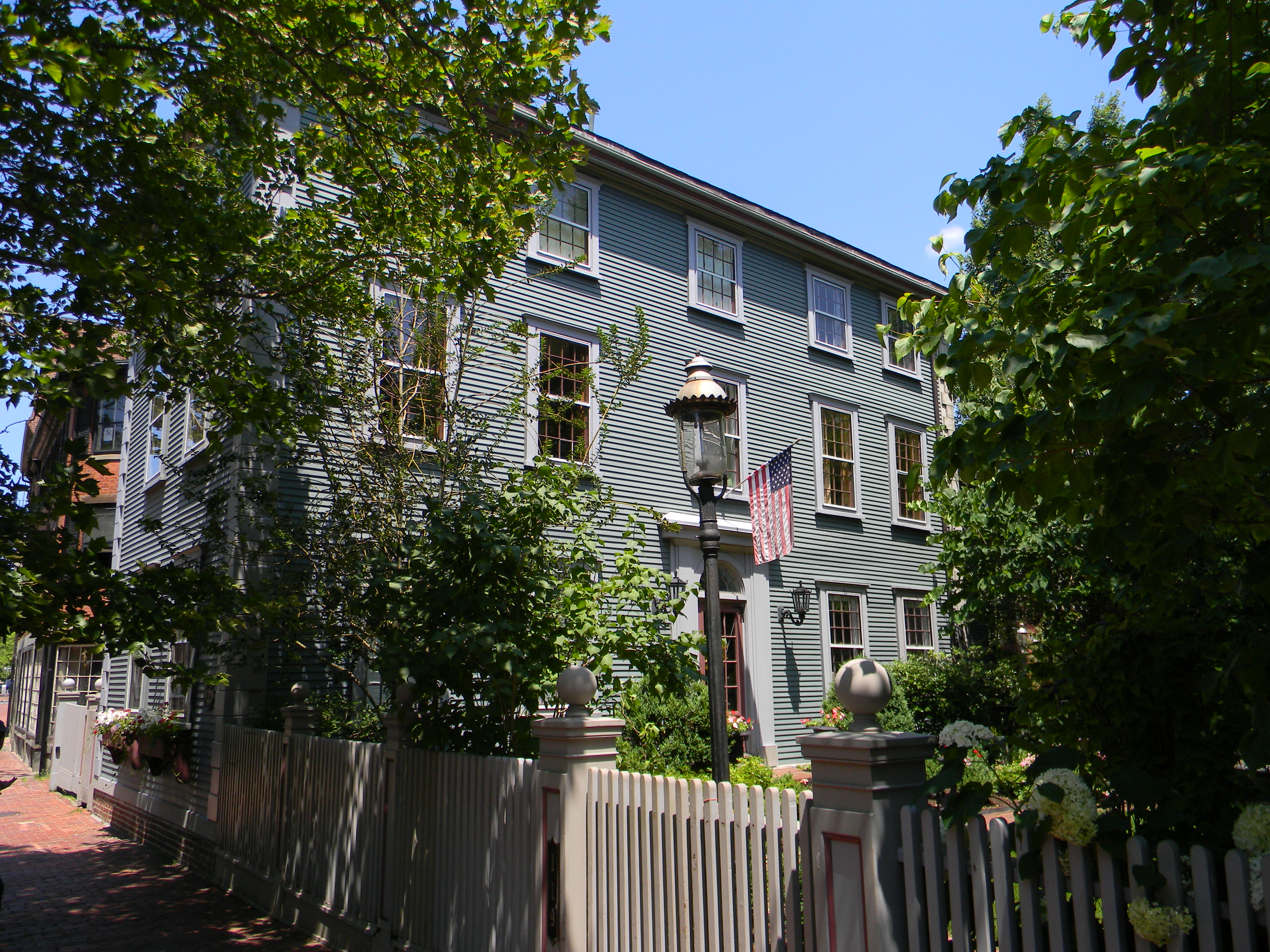
Benjamin Thompson House, 2015

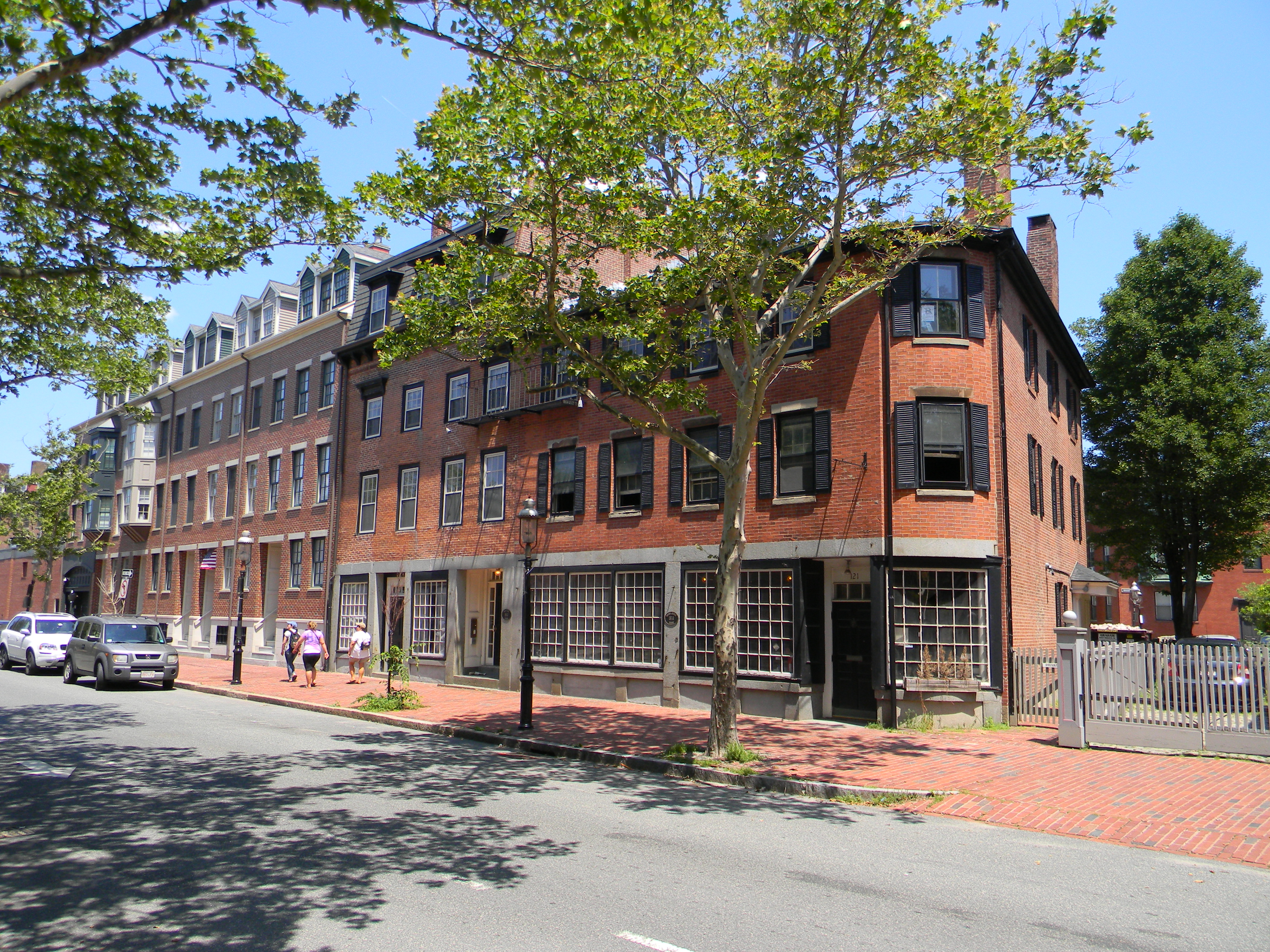
Armstrong House & Round Corner House, 2015

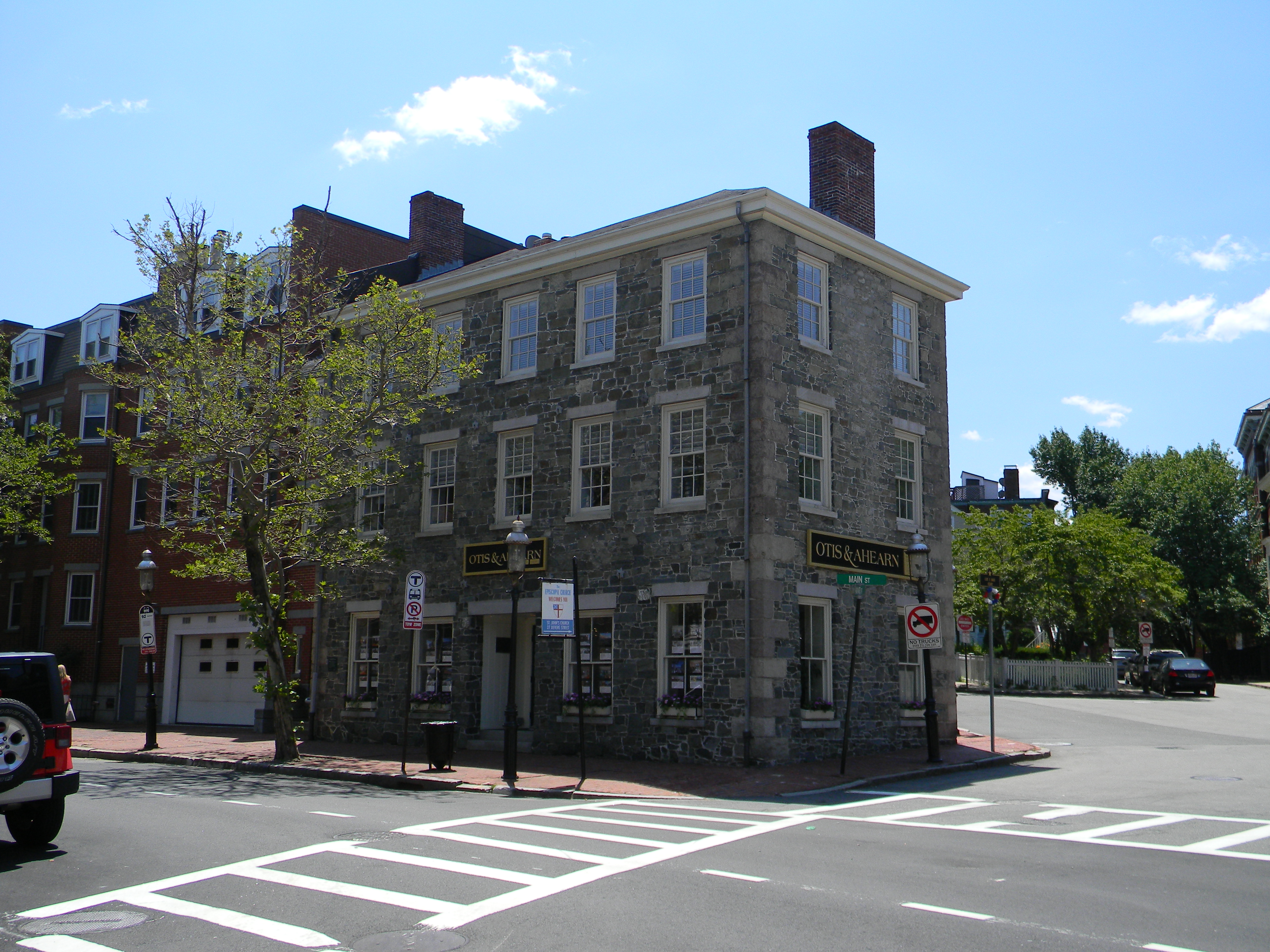
92 Main Street, 2015

== See also ==
- National Register of Historic Places listings in northern Boston, Massachusetts
