= Charlestown Heights =

Urban park in Boston, Massachusetts, US

- U.S. National Register of Historic Places
- U.S. Historic district
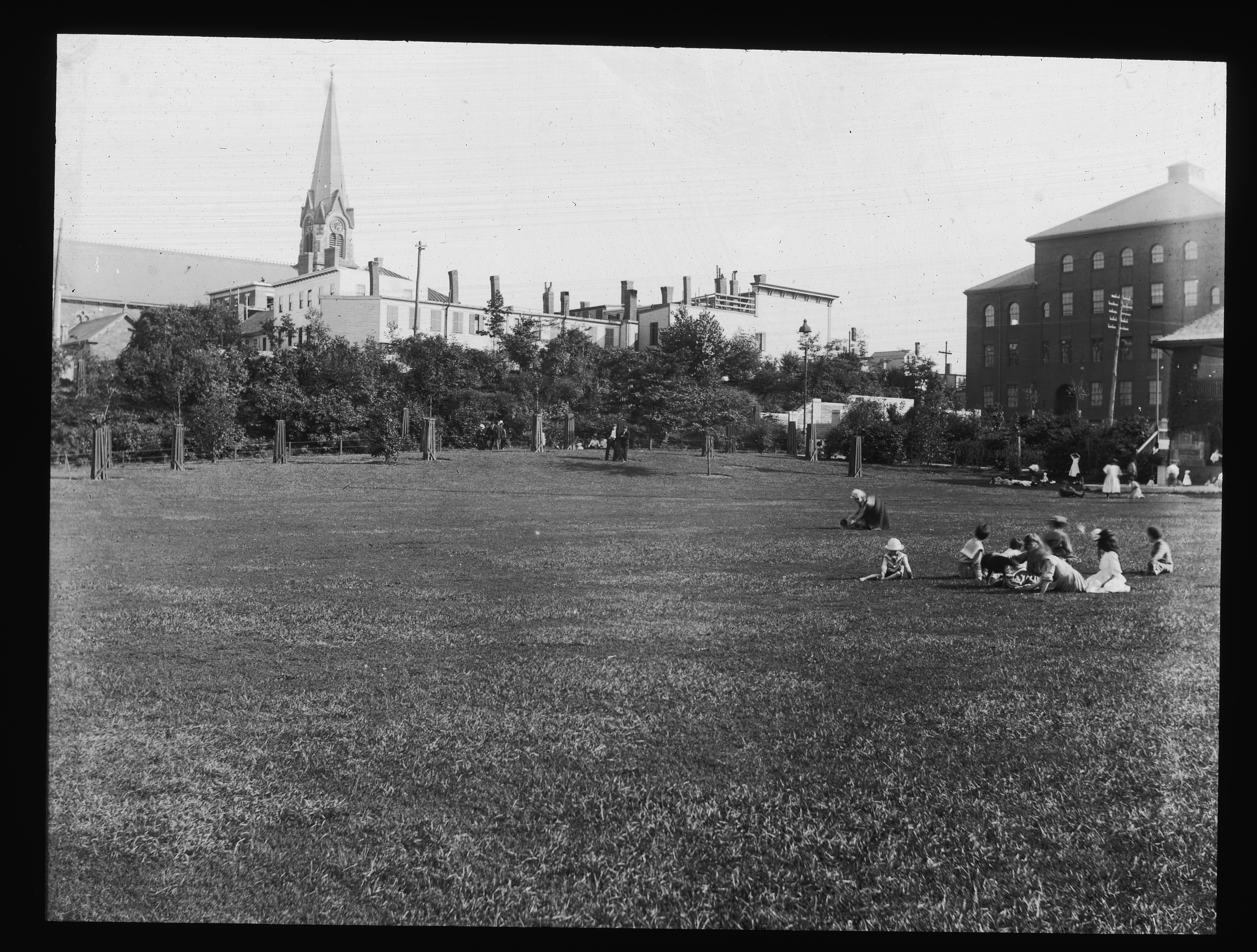
- South side park prior to 20th century modifications

- Location within Boston Location within Massachusetts Location within the United States
- Location: Boston, Massachusetts
- Coordinates: 42°22′54.7″N 71°3′58.6″W
- Area: 3.8 acres (1.5 ha)
- Built: 1891
- Architect: F.L. Olmsted & Co.
- Architectural style: Moderne, urban designed landscape
- NRHP reference No.: 97000969
- Added to NRHP: January 8, 1998

Charlestown Heights, later known as Ensign John J. Doherty Park, is an urban park in Charlestown, a neighborhood of Boston, Massachusetts. It is one of five small urban parks designed by Frederick Law Olmsted for the city. These parks were designed to provide greenspaces in densely populated neighborhoods. Charlestown Heights was laid out on the North side of Bunker Hill, sloping down the hill from Bunker Hill Street to Medford Street, between St. Martin Street and North Mead Street.

The land on which the park would be built was once part of the vast estate of the Harris family. This parcel, which originally extended across Medford Street into unfilled Mystic River flats, was sold and mortgaged to William Dehon of Boston by Harris heirs in 1849 and remained in Dehon's estate until purchased by the City.

The park was purchased by the City of Boston in July 1891, laid out shortly thereafter, and opened in 1895. It is divided into three sections. The uppermost section abutting Bunker Hill Street is a flat promenade with a central grassy area and lined with trees, paths, and benches. A monument commemorating the 1775 Battle of Bunker Hill terminates the East end of the promenade.

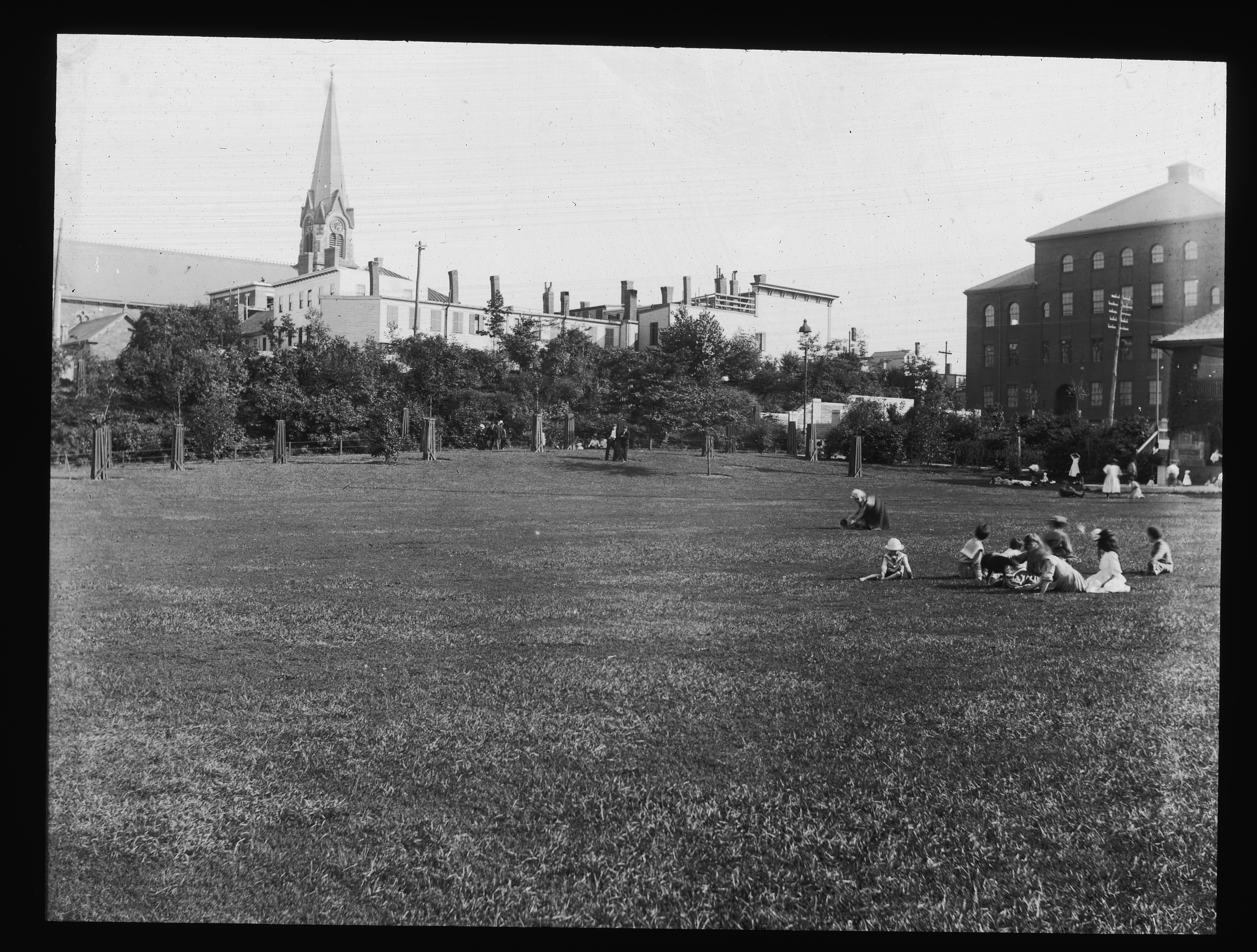
South side park prior to 20th century modifications

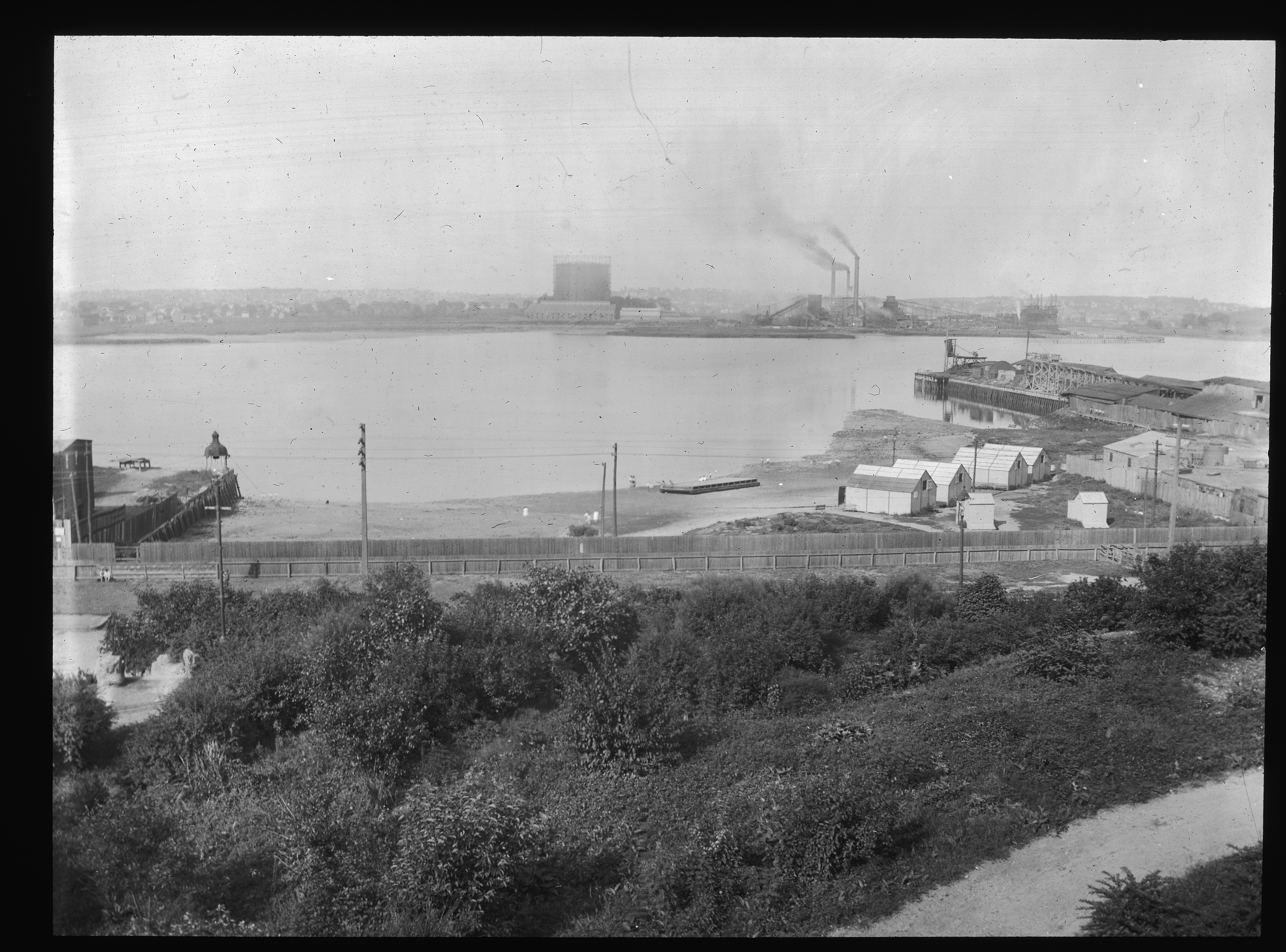
North slope looking North toward Mystic River

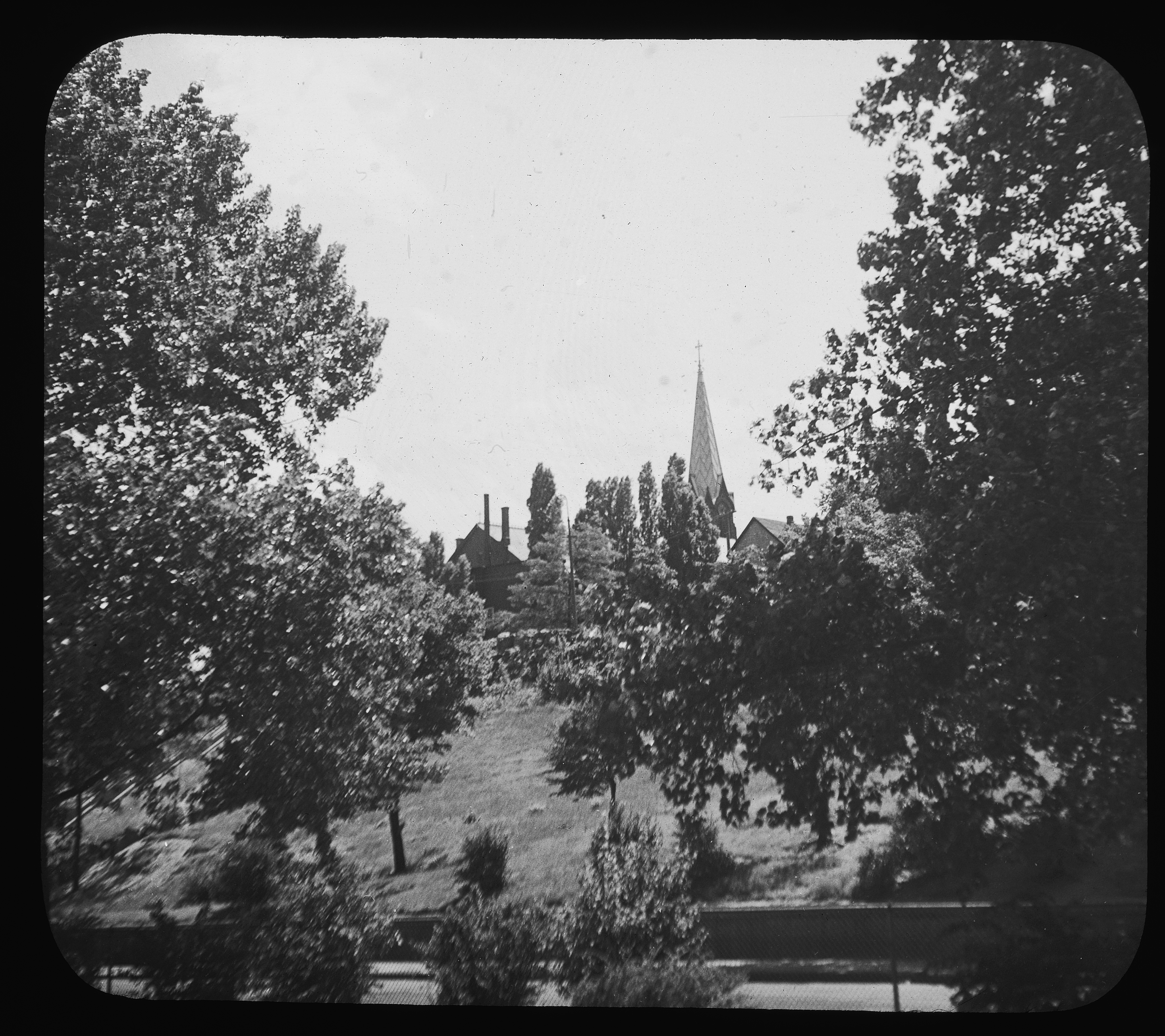
Looking South toward North side of park, Medford Street in foreground

A large central area of the park contains active recreation facilities, and is the portion of the park which has been most altered from the original 19th-century Olmsted design. The Clougherty Pool complex includes a swimming pool and Moderne-style bathhouse designed by John M. Gray. The central portion of the park also includes basketball courts, a playground, and a wading pool.

The lowest level of the park, abutting Medford Street, is a sloping meadow with naturalistic pathways meandering through it. Stairs in this section have granite risers, with cheeks of native Roxbury Puddingstone. The sinuous path has flares of granite pavers toward the top for drainage.

The park was listed on the National Register of Historic Places in 1998.

== See also ==
- National Register of Historic Places listings in northern Boston, Massachusetts
