= Temple Place Historic District =

Historic district in Massachusetts, United States

- U.S. National Register of Historic Places
- U.S. Historic district
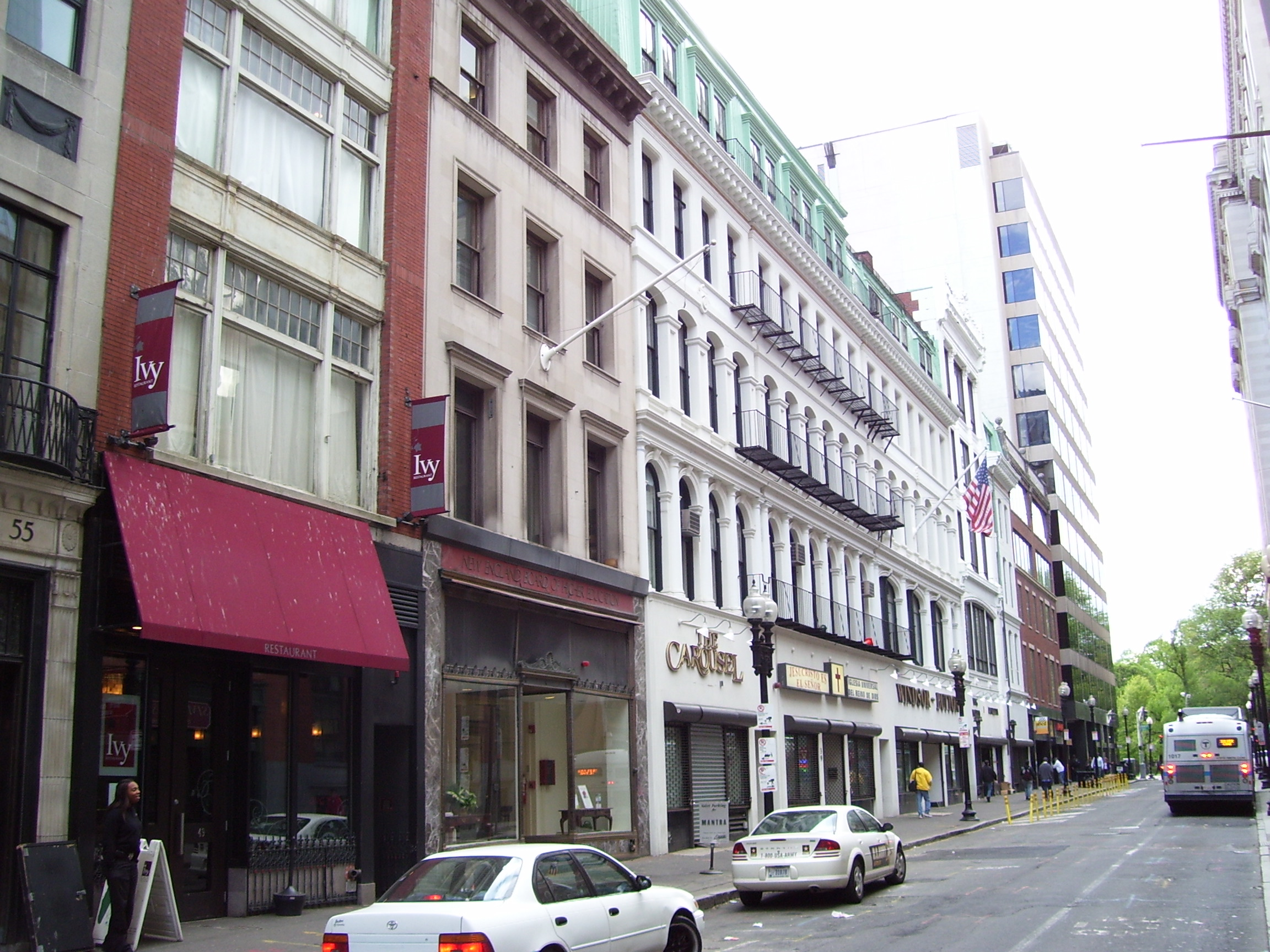

- Location within Boston Location within Massachusetts Location within the United States
- Location: Boston, Massachusetts
- Coordinates: 42°21′18.7″N 71°3′43.27″W
- Architect: Bradlee, Nathaniel J.; et al.
- Architectural style: Late 19th And Early 20th Century American Movements, Greek Revival, Late Victorian
- NRHP reference No.: 88000427
- Added to NRHP: July 26, 1988

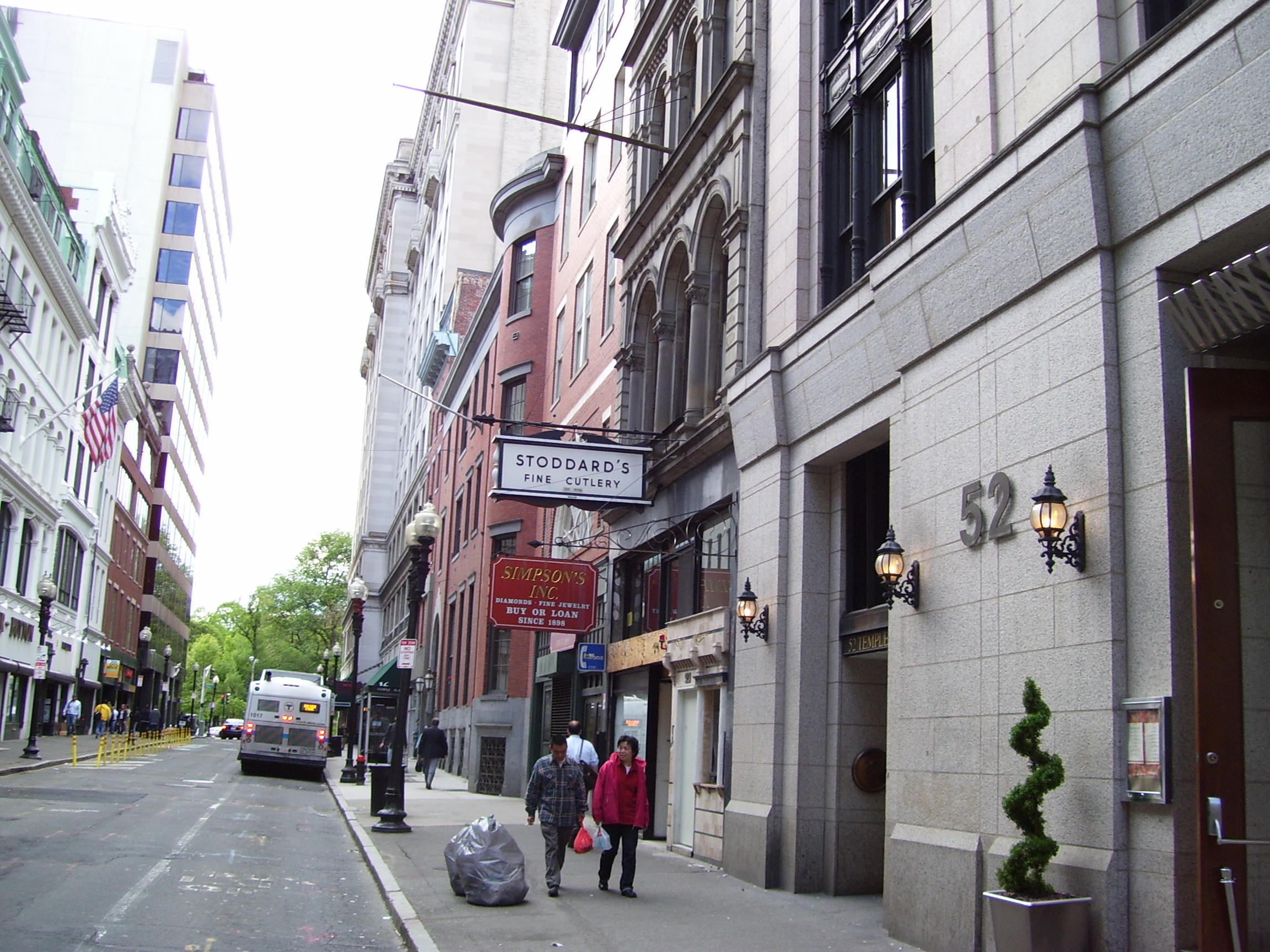
Temple Place Street

Temple Place Historic District is a national historic district at 11-55, and 26-58 Temple Place in Boston, Massachusetts. The district encompasses a set of fifteen well-preserved 19th and early-20th century buildings representing the increasing commercialization of the area, which was a fashionable upper-class address in the late 18th century. The earliest buildings date from the 1830s and are Greek Revival in style. Three buildings (29-43 Temple Place) were designed by noted Boston architect Nathaniel J. Bradlee, and are rare surviving examples of his work which predate the Great Boston Fire of 1872; one building (25-27 Temple) was designed by Peabody and Stearns.

The district was added to the National Register of Historic Places in 1988. Among the former tenants: Ritz & Hastings, photographers (1860s-1880s).

== See also ==
- National Register of Historic Places listings in northern Boston, Massachusetts
