= Francis B. Austin House =

Historic house in Massachusetts, United States

- U.S. National Register of Historic Places
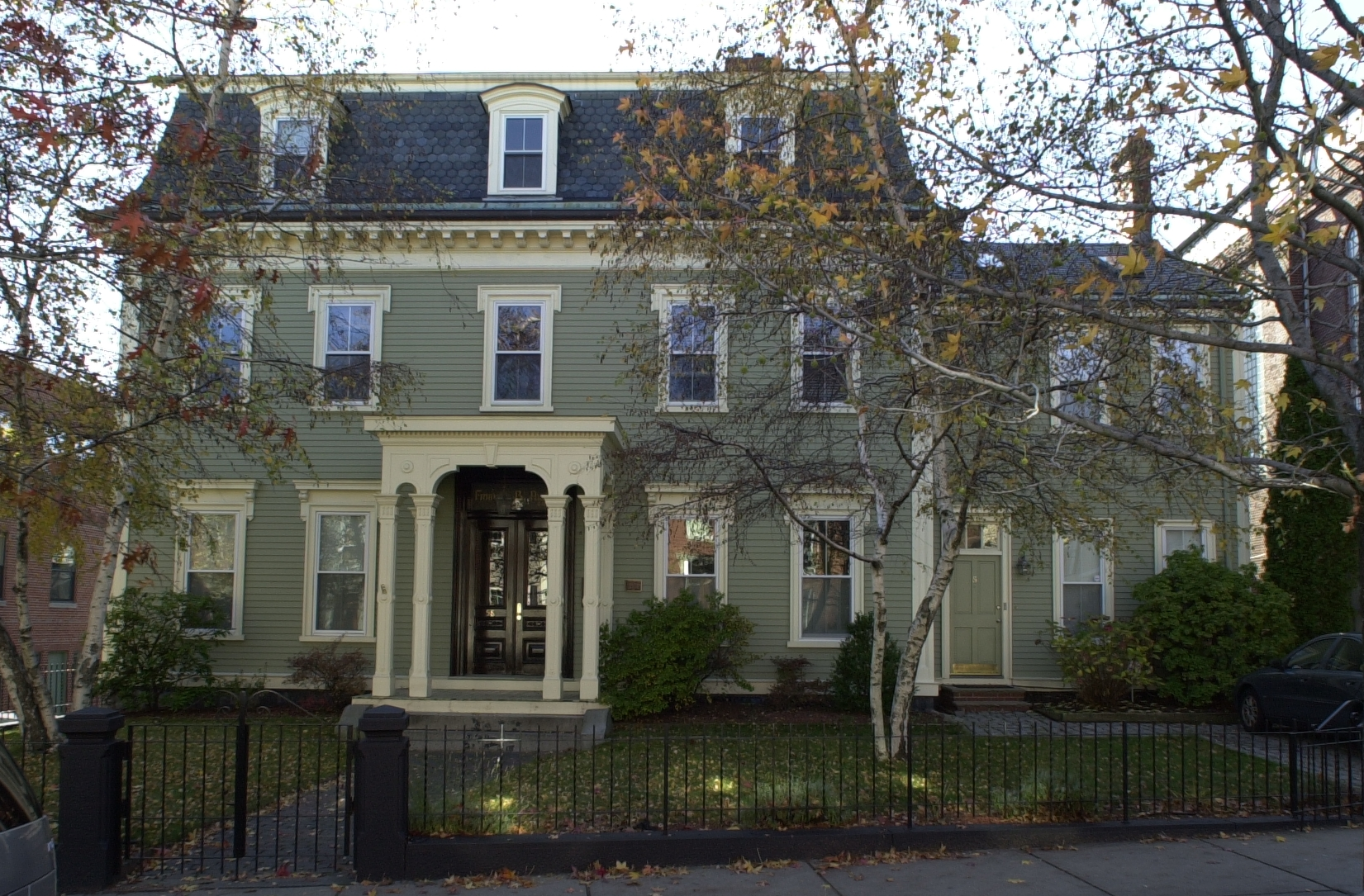

- Location within Boston Location within Massachusetts Location within the United States
- Location: 58 High St., Boston, Massachusetts 02129
- Coordinates: 42°22′35.5″N 71°3′50.5″W
- Area: less than one acre
- Built: 1832
- Architectural style: Second Empire
- NRHP reference No.: 87001478
- Added to NRHP: October 21, 1988

The Francis B. Austin House is a historic house at 58 High Street in the Charlestown neighborhood of Boston, Massachusetts. Built about 1832 and restyled in the 1860s, it is a good local example of Second Empire architecture. The Austins, for whom it was built, were prominent local landowners and businessmen. The house, converted into multiunit housing in the 20th century, was listed on the National Register of Historic Places in 1988.

== Description and history ==
The Francis B. Austin House stands in a densely built residential area of Charlestown, at the southwest corner of High and Wood Streets, west of Monument Square. It is a 2 1/2-story wood-frame structure, with a clapboarded exterior and a mansard roof providing space for a full attic level. A rear ell is two stories in height, with a gabled roof. The house stands on a stone foundation. Its front facade is five bays wide, with windows framed by shouldered moulding. The mansard roof is pierced by three dormers with rounded tops. The main entrance is at the center, sheltered by a projecting with paired square columns that have chamfered corners and paneled bases. The interior of the building has been extensively altered over the years.

The house was built about 1832 by William Austin, a prominent local landowner, as a duplex he shared with a ship's captain until his death in 1841. Originally covered by a gable roof, it was extensively altered about 1865 by Austin's son Francis, creating the mansard roof and giving it its Second Empire exterior. William Austin served Charlestown in the state legislature, and Francis was a local merchant, dealing in wholesale dry goods and also in iron and steel. For much of the 20th century the house was used as a rooming house, prior to its conversion into apartments.

== Gallery ==
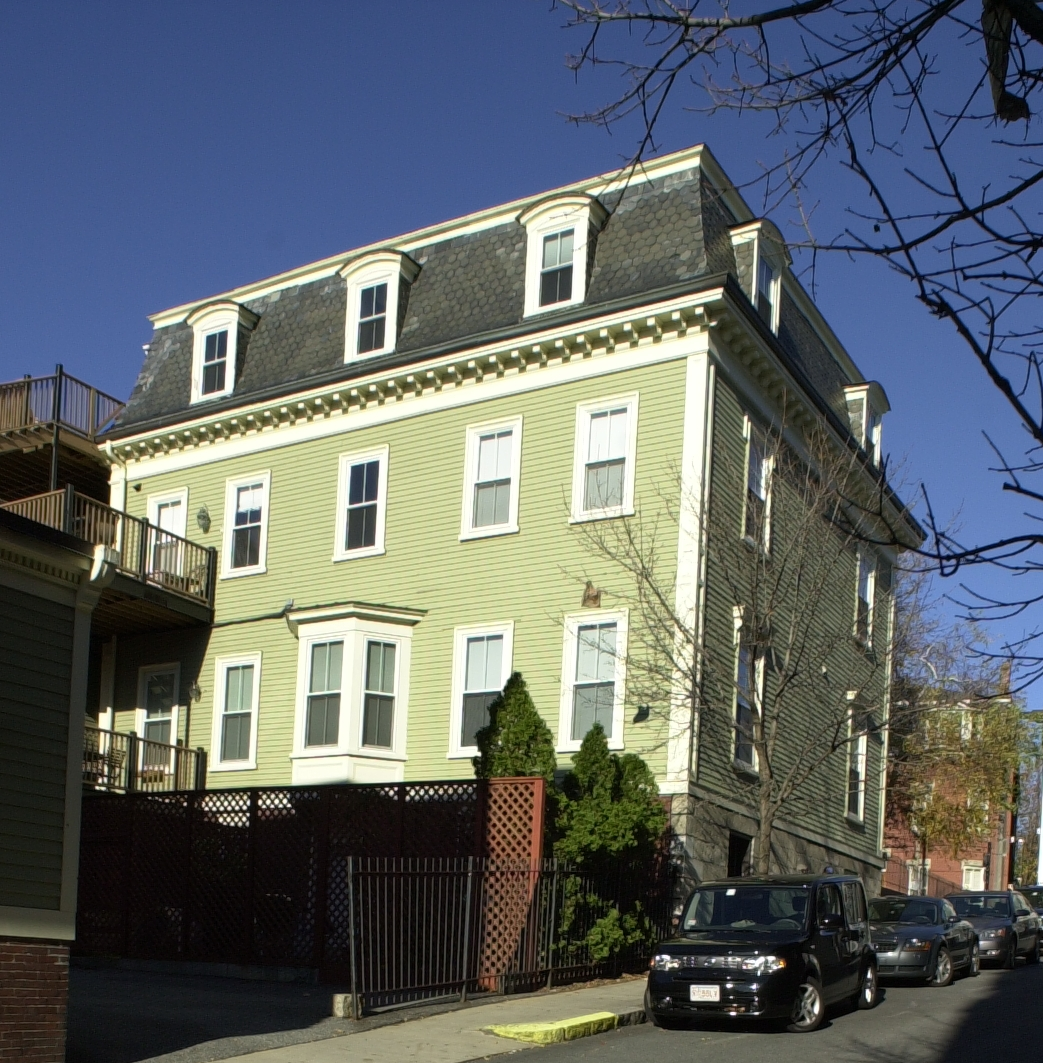

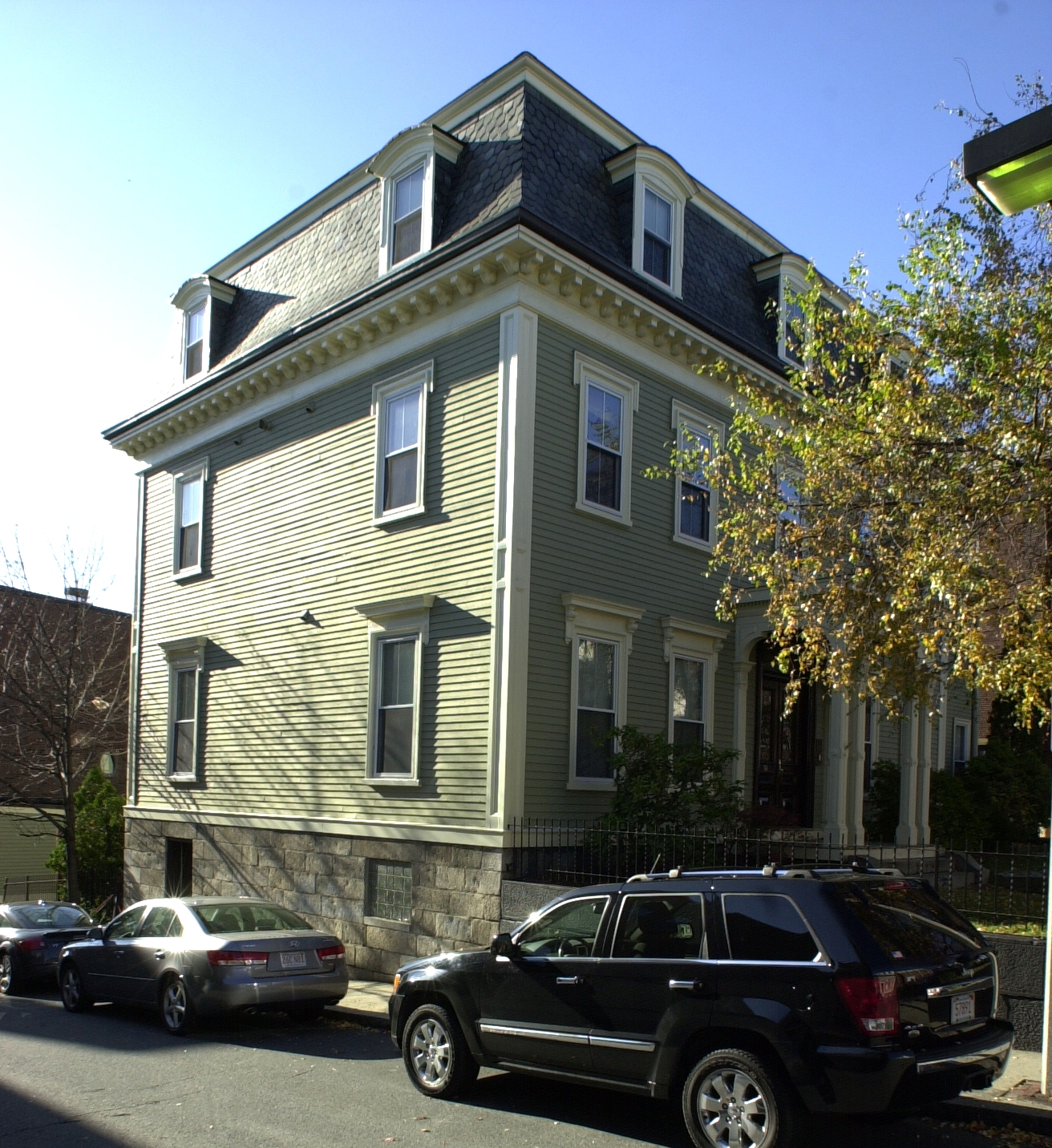

== See also ==
- National Register of Historic Places listings in northern Boston, Massachusetts
