= Hoosac Stores =

- Hoosac Stores 1 & 2; Hoosac Stores 3
- U.S. National Register of Historic Places
- U.S. Historic district
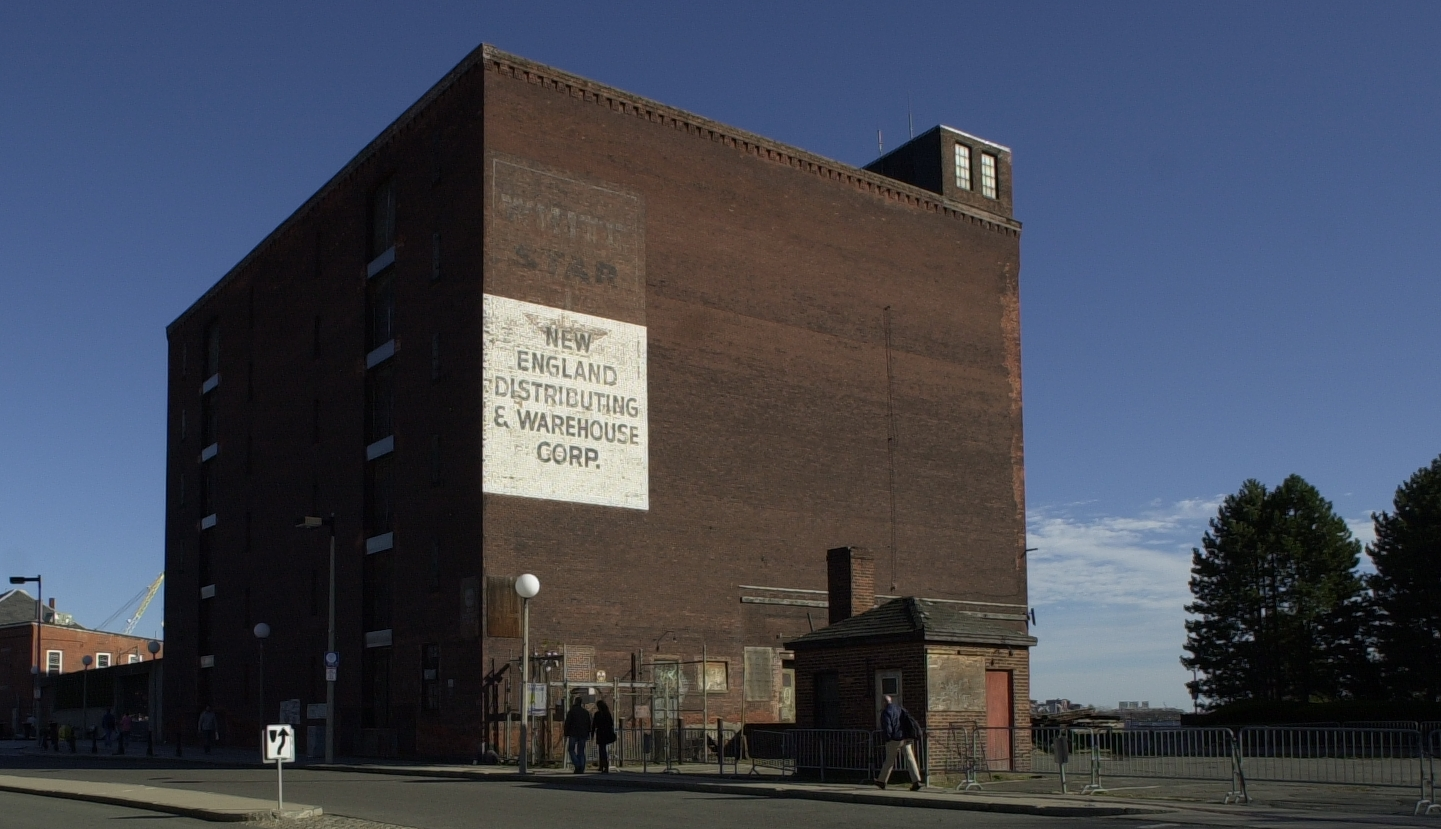
- Hoosac Stores 1 & 2

- Location within Boston Location within Massachusetts Location within the United States
- Location: 25 and 115 Water St., Charlestown, Massachusetts
- Coordinates: 42°22′21.1″N 71°3′28.3″W
- Area: 2 acres (0.81 ha)
- Built: 1875
- Architect: Fitchburg Railroad
- NRHP reference No.: 85002339
- Added to NRHP: August 14, 1985

The Hoosac Stores was a historic warehouse at 115 Constitution Road (formerly Water Street) in Charlestown, Massachusetts and was demolished in 2025. Originally designated Hoosac Stores 1 & 2, it is a six-story load-bearing brick warehouse, set just outside the gate of the Boston Navy Yard. A second, adjacent warehouse, identified as Hoosac Stores 3, was demolished in 2000 because it was structurally unsound.

The Hoosac Stores 1 & 2 warehouse was built in 1895 as part of wide-ranging state effort to draw trade activity by the Fitchburg Railroad, which operated rail service to Albany, New York. The railroad notoriously included the Hoosac Tunnel, an expensive and politically controversial project in western Massachusetts that was eventually taken over by the state. The Charlestown terminal was known as the "Hoosac Dock". Hoosac Stores 3 was built in 1875 for the Cunningham Iron Works, and was leased by the railroad in 1919, which used it into the 1960s. The surviving building is now owned by the National Park Service and is managed as part of the Boston National Historical Park's Navy Yard facilities.

The warehouses were listed on the National Register of Historic Places in 1985.

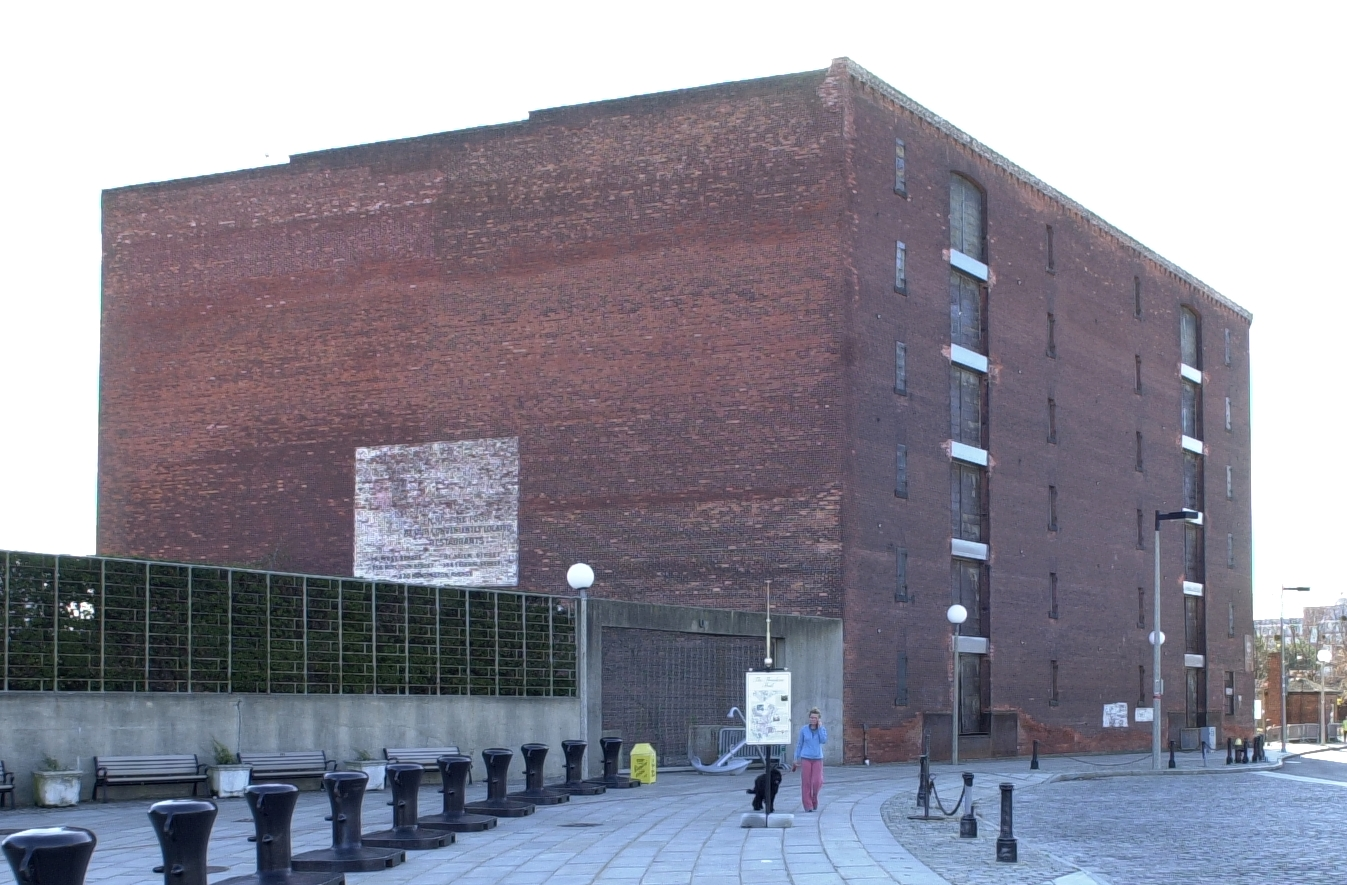
Hoosac Stores 1 & 2

== See also ==
- National Register of Historic Places listings in northern Boston, Massachusetts
