= Trinity Rectory =

Historic house in Massachusetts, United States

- U.S. National Register of Historic Places
- U.S. Historic district – Contributing property
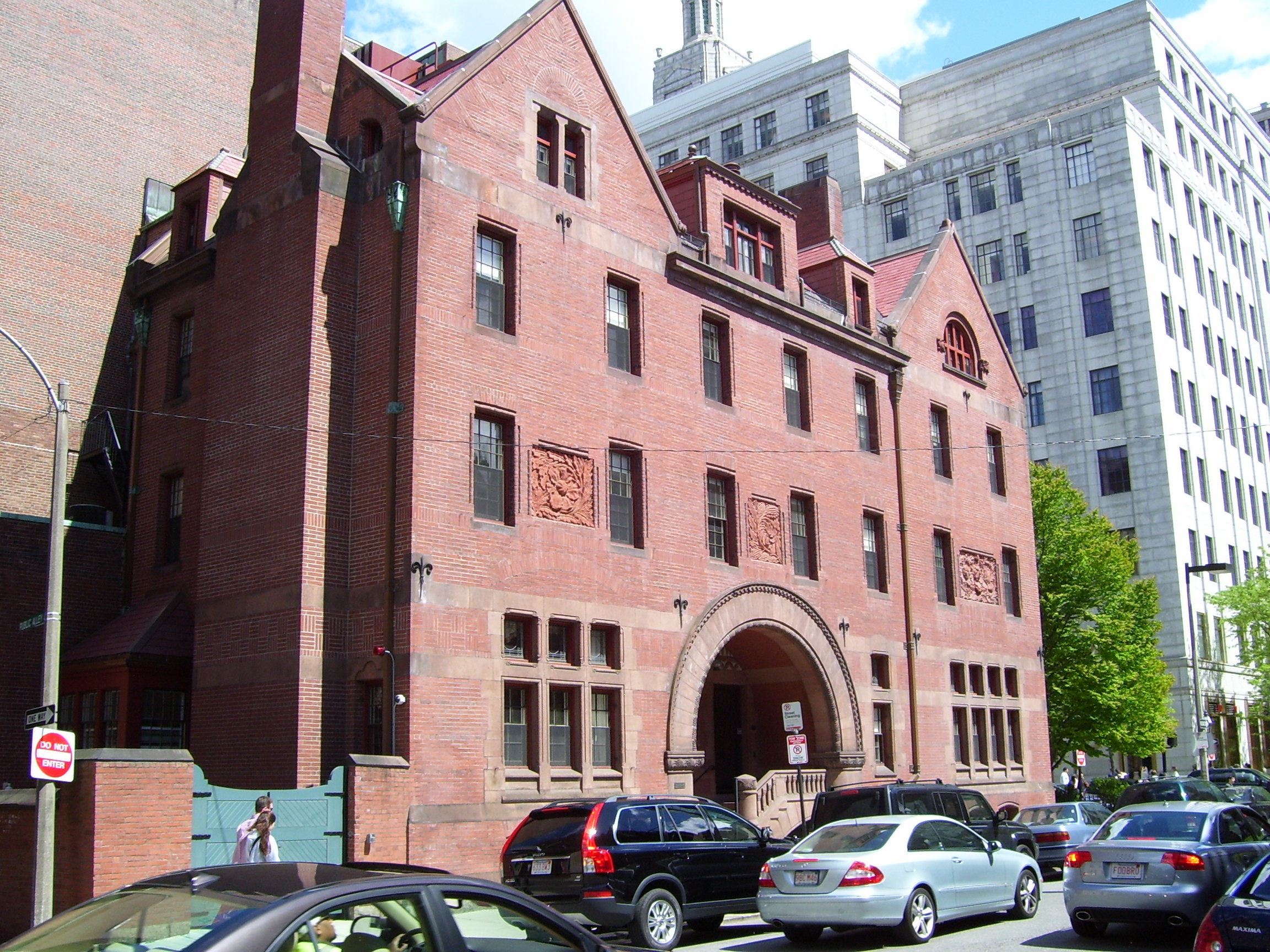

- Location within Boston Location within Massachusetts Location within the United States
- Location: Boston, Massachusetts
- Coordinates: 42°21′6.2″N 71°4′32.0″W
- Built: 1880
- Architect: Henry Hobson Richardson
- Architectural style: Romanesque
- Part of: Back Bay Historic District (ID73001948)
- NRHP reference No.: 72000150

Significant dates
- Added to NRHP: February 23, 1972
- Designated CP: August 14, 1973

Trinity Rectory is an historic building at the corner of Clarendon Street and Newbury Street in Boston, Massachusetts. It is a brick building built in 1880 by Henry Hobson Richardson and features flower-shaped reliefs carved directly into the brick exterior. The building was added to the National Historic Register in 1972.

Traditionally the residence of the rector of the Trinity Church, Boston, it has now been renovated to church office space when the current rector decided to live in a private residence.

== See also ==
- National Register of Historic Places listings in northern Boston, Massachusetts
