= National Register of Historic Places listings in northern Boston =

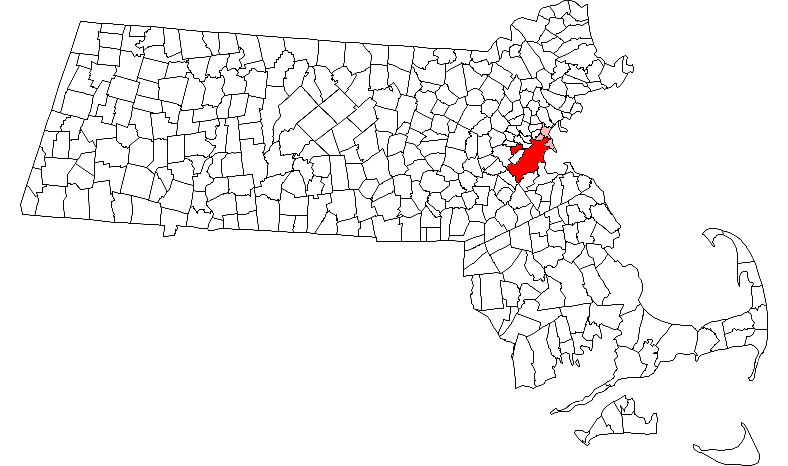
Location of Boston in Massachusetts

Boston, Massachusetts, is home to many listings on the National Register of Historic Places. This list encompasses those locations that are located north of the Massachusetts Turnpike. See National Register of Historic Places listings in southern Boston for listings south of the Turnpike. Properties and districts located elsewhere in Suffolk County's other three municipalities are also listed separately.

There are 351 properties and districts listed on the National Register in Suffolk County, including 58 National Historic Landmarks. The northern part of the city of Boston is the location of 149 of these properties and districts, including 44 National Historic Landmarks.

Contents: Counties in Massachusetts

Barnstable | Berkshire | Bristol | Dukes | Essex | Franklin | Hampden | Hampshire | Middlesex | Nantucket | Norfolk | Plymouth | Suffolk | Worcester

This National Park Service list is complete through NPS recent listings posted August 28, 2026.

== Key ==
National Register of Historic Places
National Register of Historic Places Historic district
National Historic Landmark
National Historic Landmark District
National Historic Site, National Historical Park, National Memorial, or National Monument
Delisted Landmark

== Current listings ==
	Name on the Register	Image	Date listed	Location	City or town	Description	
1	1767 Milestones	1767 Milestones	April 7, 1971 (#71000084)	Between Boston and Springfield along Old Post Rd. 42°21′42″N 71°07′48″W	Allston	Includes markers in Roxbury and Mission Hill, and markers in Hampden, Middlesex, and Worcester counties	
2	John Adams Courthouse	John Adams Courthouse	May 8, 1974 (#74000391)	Pemberton Sq. 42°21′33″N 71°03′42″W	Downtown	Contains the nation's oldest law library, the Social Law Library	
3	African Meetinghouse	African Meetinghouse	October 7, 1971 (#71000087)	8 Smith Ct. 42°21′35″N 71°03′57″W	Beacon Hill	This is the nation's longest standing black church edifice; it also hosts the Museum of African American History, open to the public.	
4	Ames Building	Ames Building	April 26, 1974 (#74000382)	1 Court St. 42°21′32″N 71°03′31″W	Downtown	Considered Boston's first skyscraper.	
5	Nathan Appleton Residence	Nathan Appleton Residence	December 22, 1977 (#77001541)	39–40 Beacon St. 42°21′25″N 71°04′01″W	Beacon Hill		
6	Arlington Street Church	Arlington Street Church	May 4, 1973 (#73000313)	Arlington and Boylston Sts. 42°21′07″N 71°04′16″W	Back Bay		
7	Armory of the First Corps of Cadets	Armory of the First Corps of Cadets	May 22, 1973 (#73000314)	97–105 Arlington St. and 130 Columbus Ave. 42°20′59″N 71°04′14″W	Bay Village		
8	Francis B. Austin House	Francis B. Austin House	October 21, 1988 (#87001478)	58 High St. 42°22′34″N 71°04′37″W	Charlestown		
9	Frederick Ayer Mansion	Frederick Ayer Mansion	April 5, 2005 (#05000459)	395 Commonwealth Ave. 42°20′57″N 71°05′25″W	Back Bay		
10	Back Bay Historic District	Back Bay Historic District	August 14, 1973 (#73001948)	Roughly bounded by the Charles River, Arlington, Providence, Boylston, and Newbury Sts., and Charlesgate East; 42°21′04″N 71°04′50″W	Back Bay		
11	Baker Congregational Church	Baker Congregational Church	November 19, 1998 (#98001381)	760 Saratoga St. 42°23′02″N 71°01′04″W	East Boston		
12	Beach-Knapp District	Beach-Knapp District	December 9, 1980 (#80000462)	Roughly bounded by Harrison Ave., Washington, Kneeland, and Beach Sts. 42°21′04″N 71°03′44″W	Chinatown		
13	Beacon Hill Historic District	Beacon Hill Historic District	October 15, 1966 (#66000130)	Bounded by Beacon St., the Charles River Embankment, and Pinckney, Revere, and Hancock Sts. 42°21′33″N 71°04′05″W	Beacon Hill		
14	Bedford Building	Bedford Building	August 21, 1979 (#79000368)	89–103 Bedford St. 42°21′10″N 71°03′32″W	Downtown		
15	Bennington Street Burying Ground	Bennington Street Burying Ground	May 22, 2002 (#02000548)	Bennington St., between Swift and Harmony Sts. 42°22′50″N 71°01′19″W	East Boston		
16	Blackstone Block Historic District	Blackstone Block Historic District	May 26, 1973 (#73000315)	Area bound by Union, Hanover, Blackstone, and North Sts. 42°21′40″N 71°03′25″W	Downtown		
17	Blake and Amory Building	Blake and Amory Building	June 2, 2014 (#14000272)	59 Temple Pl. 42°21′17″N 71°03′41″W	Downtown		
18	Boston African American National Historic Site	Boston African American National Historic Site	October 10, 1980 (#80004396)	Joy St. 42°21′36″N 71°03′55″W	Beacon Hill		
19	Boston Athenæum	Boston Athenæum	October 15, 1966 (#66000132)	10½ Beacon St. 42°21′28″N 71°03′45″W	Beacon Hill		
20	Boston Common	Boston Common	February 27, 1987 (#87000760)	Beacon, Park, Tremont, Boylston, and Charles Sts. 42°21′16″N 71°03′54″W	multiple		
21	Boston Common and Public Garden	Boston Common and Public Garden	July 12, 1972 (#72000144)	Beacon, Park, Tremont, Boylston, and Arlington Sts. 42°21′15″N 71°04′12″W	multiple		
22	Boston Edison Electric Illuminating Company	Boston Edison Electric Illuminating Company	December 9, 1980 (#80000453)	25–39 Boylston St. 42°21′08″N 71°03′51″W	Chinatown		
23	Boston Fish Pier Historic District	Boston Fish Pier Historic District	July 13, 2017 (#100001314)	212–234 Northern Ave. 42°21′06″N 71°02′15″W	South Boston		
24	Boston National Historical Park	Boston National Historical Park	October 26, 1974 (#74002222)	Inner harbor at the mouth of the Charles River; 42°22′12″N 71°03′20″W	Boston Harbor		
25	Boston Naval Shipyard	Boston Naval Shipyard	November 15, 1966 (#66000134)	East of Chelsea St., Charlestown; 42°22′30″N 71°03′09″W	Charlestown	Updated listing May 5, 2015 as "Boston National Historical Park/Charlestown Navy Yard".	
26	Boston Police Station Number One-Traffic Tunnel Administration Building	Boston Police Station Number One-Traffic Tunnel Administration Building	March 3, 2015 (#15000048)	128, 150 North & 130–140 Richmond St. 42°21′45″N 71°03′17″W	North End		
27	Boston Public Garden	Boston Public Garden	February 27, 1987 (#87000761)	Beacon, Charles, Boylston, and Arlington Sts. 42°21′15″N 71°04′12″W	Back Bay		
28	Boston Public Library	Boston Public Library	May 6, 1973 (#73000317)	Copley Sq. 42°20′57″N 71°04′43″W	Back Bay		
29	Boston Transit Commission Building	Boston Transit Commission Building	August 31, 2007 (#07000861)	15 Beacon St. 42°21′30″N 71°03′46″W	Beacon Hill		
30	Boston Young Men's Christian Union	Boston Young Men's Christian Union	December 9, 1980 (#80000451)	48 Boylston St. 42°21′07″N 71°03′53″W	Chinatown		
31	Boylston Building	Boylston Building	December 9, 1980 (#80000450)	2–22 Boylston St. 42°21′07″N 71°03′49″W	Chinatown		
32	Building at 138–142 Portland Street	Building at 138–142 Portland Street	September 5, 1985 (#85002015)	138–142 Portland St. 42°21′51″N 71°03′43″W	Downtown		
33	Bulfinch Triangle Historic District	Bulfinch Triangle Historic District	February 27, 1986 (#86000274)	Roughly bounded by Canal, Market, Merrimac, and Causeway Sts. 42°21′50″N 71°03′41″W	Downtown		
34	Bunker Hill Monument	Bunker Hill Monument	October 15, 1966 (#66000138)	Breed's Hill; 42°22′35″N 71°03′41″W	Charlestown		
35	Bunker Hill School	Bunker Hill School	October 15, 1987 (#87001771)	68 Baldwin St. 42°22′56″N 71°04′15″W	Charlestown		
36	Central Congregational Church	Central Congregational Church	October 16, 2012 (#12001012)	67 Newbury St. 42°21′08″N 71°04′27″W	Back Bay	This church has the largest intact Tiffany-designed ecclesiastical interior in its original location in America. The congregation is now known as the Church of the Covenant.	
37	Charles Playhouse	Charles Playhouse	June 16, 1980 (#80000676)	74–78 Warenton St. 42°20′58″N 71°03′59″W	Theatre District		
38	Charles River Basin Historic District	Charles River Basin Historic District	December 22, 1978 (#78000436)	Both banks of the Charles River from Eliot Bridge to Charles River Dam; 42°21′46″N 71°06′28″W	Back Bay		
39	Charles River Reservation Parkways	Charles River Reservation Parkways	January 18, 2006 (#05001530)	Soldiers Field, Nonantum, Leo Birmingham, Arsenal, Greenough, N. Beacon, Charles River, Norumbega, Recreation; 42°21′42″N 71°09′31″W	Allston/Brighton	Extends into Cambridge, Newton, Waltham, and Watertown and Weston in Middlesex County	
40	Charles River Reservation (Speedway)-Upper Basin Headquarters	Charles River Reservation (Speedway)-Upper Basin Headquarters	July 19, 2010 (#10000506)	1420–1440 Soldiers Field Rd. 42°21′41″N 71°08′47″W	Brighton		
41	Charlestown Heights	Charlestown Heights	January 8, 1998 (#97000969)	Roughly bounded by St. Martin, Bunker Hill, Medford, and Sackville Sts. 42°22′56″N 71°04′05″W	Charlestown		
42	Church Green Buildings Historic District	Church Green Buildings Historic District	December 30, 1999 (#99001614)	101–113 Summer St. 42°21′12″N 71°03′30″W	Downtown		
43	Codman Building	Codman Building	October 19, 1983 (#83004097)	55 Kilby St. 42°21′28″N 71°03′23″W	Downtown		
44	Compton Building	Compton Building	December 31, 2008 (#08001284)	159, 161–175 Devonshire Street, 18–20 Arch Street; 42°21′21″N 71°03′27″W	Downtown		
45	Congress Street Fire Station	Congress Street Fire Station	September 3, 1987 (#87001396)	344 Congress St. 42°20′58″N 71°02′56″W	South Boston		
46	Copp's Hill Burying Ground	Copp's Hill Burying Ground	April 18, 1974 (#74000385)	Charter, Snowhill, and Hull Sts. 42°22′02″N 71°03′23″W	North End		
47	Copp's Hill Terrace	Copp's Hill Terrace	April 19, 1990 (#90000631)	Between Commercial and Charter Sts. west of Jackson Place; 42°22′04″N 71°03′22″W	North End		
48	Crowninshield House	Crowninshield House	February 23, 1972 (#72000145)	164 Marlborough St. 42°21′09″N 71°04′45″W	Back Bay		
49	Custom House District	Custom House District	May 11, 1973 (#73000321)	Between the J.F.K. Expressway and Kirby St. and S. Market and High and Batterymarch Sts. 42°21′28″N 71°03′12″W	Downtown		
50	Dill Building	Dill Building	December 9, 1980 (#80000448)	11–25 Stuart St. 42°21′04″N 71°03′50″W	Theatre District		
51	Eagle Hill Historic District	Eagle Hill Historic District	February 26, 1998 (#98000149)	Roughly bounded by Border, Lexington, Trenton, and Falcon Sts. 42°22′51″N 71°02′05″W	East Boston		
52	Old East Boston High School	Old East Boston High School	March 15, 2006 (#06000127)	127 Marion St. 42°22′41″N 71°02′16″W	East Boston		
53	Engine House No. 34	Engine House No. 34	October 24, 1985 (#85003375)	444 Western Ave. 42°21′43″N 71°08′30″W	Brighton		
54	Ether Dome	Ether Dome	October 15, 1966 (#66000366)	Fruit St. 42°21′48″N 71°04′07″W	West End	Part of Massachusetts General Hospital, Bulfinch Building	
55	Faneuil Hall	Faneuil Hall	October 15, 1966 (#66000368)	Dock Sq. 42°21′36″N 71°03′24″W	Downtown		
56	Peter Faneuil School	Peter Faneuil School	December 16, 1994 (#94001492)	60 Joy St. 42°21′37″N 71°03′58″W	Beacon Hill		
57	Filene's Department Store	Filene's Department Store	July 24, 1986 (#86001909)	426 Washington St. 42°21′18″N 71°03′39″W	Downtown	Partially demolished by investors in 2008, irrespective of its historical significance. Historic Burnham Building (Beaux-Arts) remains, now part of Millennium Tower development.	
58	First Baptist Church	First Baptist Church	February 23, 1972 (#72000146)	Commonwealth Ave. and Clarendon St. 42°21′06″N 71°04′36″W	Back Bay		
59	Fort Point Channel Historic District	Fort Point Channel Historic District	September 10, 2004 (#04000959)	Necco Court, Thomson Place, and A, Binford, Congress, Farnsworth, Melcher, Midway, Sleeper, Stillings, and Summer Sts. 42°20′59″N 71°03′05″W	South Boston		
60	I.J. Fox Building	I.J. Fox Building	December 29, 2015 (#15000942)	407 Washington St. 42°21′21″N 71°03′36″W	Downtown Crossing		
61	Fulton-Commercial Streets District	Fulton-Commercial Streets District	March 21, 1973 (#73000319)	Fulton, Commercial, Mercantile, Lewis, and Richmond Sts.; also 81–95 Richmond St. 42°21′43″N 71°03′12″W	North End	81-95 Richmond St. represent a boundary increase	
62	Gibson House	Gibson House	August 7, 2001 (#01001048)	137 Beacon St. 42°21′17″N 71°04′27″W	Back Bay		
63	Ozias Goodwin House	Ozias Goodwin House	June 23, 1988 (#88000908)	7 Jackson Ave. 42°22′03″N 71°03′19″W	North End		
64	Gridley Street Historic District	Gridley Street Historic District	December 3, 2014 (#14000974)	Bounded by Congress, High, Pearl & Purchase Sts. 42°21′17″N 71°03′15″W	Financial District		
65	Chester Harding House	Chester Harding House	October 15, 1966 (#66000764)	16 Beacon St. 42°21′28″N 71°03′47″W	Beacon Hill		
66	Harvard Stadium	Harvard Stadium	February 27, 1987 (#87000757)	60 N. Harvard St. 42°22′01″N 71°07′36″W	Allston		
67	Hayden Building	Hayden Building	December 9, 1980 (#80000446)	681–683 Washington St. 42°21′05″N 71°03′50″W	Downtown		
68	Headquarters House	Headquarters House	October 15, 1966 (#66000765)	55 Beacon St. 42°21′23″N 71°04′08″W	Beacon Hill		
69	Hoosac Stores 1 & 2-Hoosac Stores 3	Hoosac Stores 1 & 2-Hoosac Stores 3	August 14, 1985 (#85002339)	115 Constitution St. 42°22′16″N 71°03′40″W	Charlestown	Hoosac Stores 3 was demolished in 2000.	
70	House at 1 Bay Street	House at 1 Bay Street	February 9, 1994 (#93001573)	1 Bay St. 42°20′53″N 71°04′07″W	Bay Village		
71	Samuel Gridley and Julia Ward Howe House	Samuel Gridley and Julia Ward Howe House	September 13, 1974 (#74002044)	13 Chestnut St. 42°21′27″N 71°04′03″W	Beacon Hill		
72	International Trust Company Building	International Trust Company Building	September 10, 1979 (#79000369)	39–47 Milk St. 42°21′23″N 71°03′29″W	Downtown		
73	John F. Kennedy Federal Building	John F. Kennedy Federal Building	November 15, 2021 (#100007130)	15 New Sudbury St. 42°21′41″N 71°03′34″W	Government Center		
74	King's Chapel	King's Chapel	May 2, 1974 (#74002045)	Tremont and School Sts. 42°21′28″N 71°03′38″W	Downtown		
75	Leather District	Leather District	December 21, 1983 (#83004098)	Roughly bounded by Atlantic Ave., Kneeland, Lincoln, and Essex Sts. 42°21′03″N 71°03′30″W	Leather District		
76	Liberty Tree District	Liberty Tree District	December 9, 1980 (#80000460)	Roughly bounded by Harrison Ave., Washington, Essex and Beach Sts. 42°21′07″N 71°03′47″W	Downtown		
77	Locke-Ober Restaurant	Locke-Ober Restaurant	July 24, 1986 (#86001911)	3–4 Winter Pl. 42°21′20″N 71°03′46″W	Downtown		
78	Long Wharf and Customhouse Block	Long Wharf and Customhouse Block	November 13, 1966 (#66000768)	Foot of State St. 42°21′37″N 71°02′59″W	Downtown		
79	Theodore Lyman School	Theodore Lyman School	December 2, 2014 (#14000975)	30 Gove St. 42°22′19″N 71°02′16″W	East Boston		
80	Mariner's House	Mariner's House	November 12, 1999 (#99001302)	11 North Square; 42°21′50″N 71°03′13″W	North End		
81	Massachusetts General Hospital	Massachusetts General Hospital	December 30, 1970 (#70000682)	Fruit Street; 42°21′48″N 71°04′08″W	West End	1820s hospital building by Charles Bulfinch	
82	Massachusetts Statehouse	Massachusetts Statehouse	October 15, 1966 (#66000771)	Beacon Hill; 42°21′31″N 71°03′52″W	Beacon Hill		
83	Donald McKay House	Donald McKay House	June 2, 1982 (#82004450)	78–80 White St. 42°22′49″N 71°02′14″W	East Boston		
84	Metropolitan Theatre	Metropolitan Theatre	December 9, 1980 (#80000445)	252–272 Tremont St. 42°21′01″N 71°03′56″W	Theatre District		
85	Monument Square Historic District	Monument Square Historic District	June 2, 1987 (#87001128)	Monument Square; 42°22′35″N 71°03′38″W	Charlestown	Not to be confused with the Monument Square Historic District (Jamaica Plain, Boston, Massachusetts).	
86	Middlesex Canal Historic and Archaeological District	Middlesex Canal Historic and Archaeological District	November 19, 2009 (#09000936)	Numerous locations along the historic route of the Middlesex Canal	Charlestown	Extends into Middlesex County.	
87	Lightship No. 112, Nantucket	Lightship No. 112, Nantucket	December 20, 1989 (#89002464)	Boston Harbor Shipyard and Marina end of Marginal Street; 42°21′40″N 71°02′07″W	East Boston	Largest lightship ever built. Listed in Portland, Maine. Arrived in Boston May 11, 2010	
88	William C. Nell House	William C. Nell House	May 11, 1976 (#76001979)	3 Smith Ct. 42°21′28″N 71°03′53″W	Beacon Hill		
89	Newspaper Row	Newspaper Row	July 7, 1983 (#83000607)	322–328 Washington St., 5–23 Milk St., and 11 Hawley St. 42°21′24″N 71°03′33″W	Downtown		
90	North Terminal Garage	North Terminal Garage	September 11, 1997 (#97000971)	600 Commercial St. 42°22′01″N 71°03′28″W	North End		
91	Ohabei Shalom Cemetery	Ohabei Shalom Cemetery	August 19, 2008 (#08000795)	147 Wordsworth St. 42°22′59″N 71°00′52″W	East Boston		
92	Old City Hall	Old City Hall	December 30, 1970 (#70000687)	School and Providence Sts. 42°21′29″N 71°03′35″W	Downtown		
93	Old Corner Bookstore	Old Corner Bookstore	April 11, 1973 (#73000322)	Northwestern corner of Washington and School Sts. 42°21′27″N 71°03′32″W	Downtown		
94	Old North Church	Old North Church	October 15, 1966 (#66000776)	193 Salem St. 42°21′58″N 71°03′18″W	North End		
95	Old South Church in Boston	Old South Church in Boston	December 30, 1970 (#70000690)	645 Boylston St. 42°21′01″N 71°04′43″W	Back Bay		
96	Old South Meetinghouse	Old South Meetinghouse	October 15, 1966 (#66000778)	Milk and Washington Sts. 42°21′25″N 71°03′31″W	Downtown		
97	Old State House	Old State House	October 15, 1966 (#66000779)	Washington and State Sts. 42°21′32″N 71°03′28″W	Downtown		
98	Old West Church	Old West Church	December 30, 1970 (#70000691)	131 Cambridge St. 42°21′41″N 71°03′55″W	West End		
99	Olmsted Park System	Olmsted Park System	December 8, 1971 (#71000086)	Encompassing the Back Bay Fens, Muddy River, Olmsted (Leverett Park), Jamaica Park, Arborway, and Franklin Park; 42°20′43″N 71°05′45″W	Jamaica Plain and Fenway-Kenmore		
100	(First) Harrison Gray Otis House	(First) Harrison Gray Otis House	December 30, 1970 (#70000539)	141 Cambridge St. 42°21′41″N 71°03′57″W	West End		
101	(Second) Harrison Gray Otis House	(Second) Harrison Gray Otis House	July 27, 1973 (#73001955)	85 Mt. Vernon St. 42°21′29″N 71°04′05″W	Beacon Hill		
102	Paine Furniture Building	Paine Furniture Building	September 12, 2002 (#02001039)	75–81 Arlington St. 42°21′04″N 71°04′17″W	Back Bay		
103	Park Street District	Park Street District	May 1, 1974 (#74000390)	Tremont, Park, and Beacon Sts. 42°21′26″N 71°03′44″W	Beacon Hill		
104	Parker House	Parker House	December 26, 2023 (#86003804)	56-62 School St. and 60-68 Tremont St. 42°21′25″N 71°04′09″W	Financial District	The Omni Parker House Hotel.	
104	Francis Parkman House	Francis Parkman House	October 15, 1966 (#66000782)	50 Chestnut St. 42°21′25″N 71°04′09″W	Beacon Hill		
105	Phipps Street Burying Ground	Phipps Street Burying Ground	May 14, 1974 (#74000907)	Phipps St. 42°22′34″N 71°04′13″W	Charlestown		
106	Piano Row District	Piano Row District	December 9, 1980 (#80000458)	Boston Common, Park Sq., Boylston Pl. and Tremont St. 42°21′08″N 71°03′55″W	Downtown		
107	Pierce–Hichborn House	Pierce–Hichborn House	November 24, 1968 (#68000042)	29 North Sq. 42°21′48″N 71°03′16″W	North End		
108	Publicity Building	Publicity Building	August 20, 2003 (#03000781)	40–44 Bromfield St. 42°21′23″N 71°03′41″W	Downtown		
109	Quincy Grammar School	Quincy Grammar School	August 1, 2017 (#100001458)	88-90 Tyler St. 42°20′56″N 71°03′41″W	Chinatown		
110	Quincy Market	Quincy Market	November 13, 1966 (#66000784)	S. Market St. 42°21′36″N 71°03′18″W	Downtown		
111	Paul Revere House	Paul Revere House	October 15, 1966 (#66000785)	19 North Sq. 42°21′49″N 71°03′16″W	North End		
112	Richardson Block	Richardson Block	August 9, 1986 (#86001504)	113–151 Pearl and 109–119 High Sts. 42°21′18″N 71°03′17″W	Downtown		
113	ROSEWAY (schooner)	ROSEWAY (schooner)	September 25, 1997 (#97001278)	Boston Harbor; 44°12′38″N 69°03′46″W	Boston Harbor	National Historic Landmark	
114	Roughan Hall	Roughan Hall	April 15, 1982 (#82004448)	15–18 City Sq. 42°22′20″N 71°03′44″W	Charlestown		
115	Russia Wharf Buildings	Russia Wharf Buildings	December 2, 1980 (#80000463)	518–540 Atlantic Ave., 270 Congress St. and 276–290 Congress St. 42°21′12″N 71°03′11″W	Downtown		
116	St. Paul's Church	St. Paul's Church	December 30, 1970 (#70000730)	136 Tremont St. 42°21′21″N 71°03′46″W	Downtown		
117	St. Stephen's Church	St. Stephen's Church	April 14, 1975 (#75000300)	Hanover St. between Clark and Harris Sts. 42°21′56″N 71°03′10″W	North End		
118	Sears' Crescent and Sears' Block	Sears' Crescent and Sears' Block	August 9, 1986 (#86001486)	38–68 and 70–72 Cornhill; 42°21′34″N 71°03′34″W	Downtown		
119	David Sears House	David Sears House	December 30, 1970 (#70000731)	42 Beacon St. 42°21′25″N 71°04′03″W	Beacon Hill		
120	Second Brazer Building	Second Brazer Building	July 24, 1986 (#86001913)	25–29 State St. 42°21′30″N 71°03′28″W	Downtown		
121	Sam S. Shubert Theatre	Sam S. Shubert Theatre	December 9, 1980 (#80000444)	263–265 Tremont St. 42°21′00″N 71°03′58″W	Theatre District		
122	South Station Headhouse	South Station Headhouse	February 13, 1975 (#75000299)	Atlantic Ave. and Summer St. 42°21′07″N 71°03′21″W	Downtown		
123	R.H. Stearns House	R.H. Stearns House	June 16, 1980 (#80000671)	140 Tremont St. 42°21′20″N 71°03′47″W	Downtown	Although the site is named the "R.H. Stearns House", it is the former main building of the R.H. Stearns Department Store company.	
124	Suffolk County Jail	Suffolk County Jail	April 23, 1980 (#80000670)	215 Charles St. 42°21′43″N 71°04′13″W	West End		
125	Charles Sumner House	Charles Sumner House	November 7, 1973 (#73001953)	20 Hancock St. 42°21′36″N 71°03′56″W	Beacon Hill		
126	Temple Place Historic District	Temple Place Historic District	July 26, 1988 (#88000427)	11–55, 26–58 Temple Pl. 42°21′18″N 71°03′40″W	Downtown		
127	Terminal Storage Warehouse District	Terminal Storage Warehouse District	March 12, 2012 (#12000099)	267–281 Medford St., 40 & 50 Terminal St. 42°22′51″N 71°03′42″W	Charlestown		
128	Textile District	Textile District	November 29, 1990 (#90001757)	Roughly Essex St. from Phillips Sq. to Columbia St. and Chauncy St. from Phillips Sq. to Rowe Pl. 42°20′52″N 71°03′17″W	Downtown		
129	Town Hill District	Town Hill District	May 11, 1973 (#73000850)	Bounded roughly by Rutherford Ave. and Main and Warren Sts. 42°22′21″N 71°03′44″W	Charlestown		
130	Tremont Street Subway	Tremont Street Subway	October 15, 1966 (#66000788)	Beneath Tremont, Boylston, and Washington Sts. 42°21′23″N 71°03′47″W	Downtown	First subway in the Western Hemisphere; still operating (as part of the MBTA's Green Line)	
131	Trinity Church	Trinity Church	July 1, 1970 (#70000733)	Copley Sq. 42°21′07″N 71°04′28″W	Back Bay		
132	Trinity Neighborhood House	Trinity Neighborhood House	April 14, 1992 (#92000356)	406 Meridian St. 42°22′49″N 71°02′23″W	East Boston		
133	Trinity Rectory	Trinity Rectory	February 23, 1972 (#72000150)	Clarendon and Newbury Sts. 42°21′06″N 71°04′34″W	Back Bay		
134	Union Oyster House	Union Oyster House	May 27, 2003 (#03000645)	41–43 Union Street; 42°21′46″N 71°03′38″W	Downtown		
135	Union Wharf	Union Wharf	June 22, 1980 (#80000669)	295–353 Commercial St. 42°21′56″N 71°03′03″W	North End		
136	United Shoe Machinery Corporation Building	United Shoe Machinery Corporation Building	August 19, 1980 (#80000668)	138–164 Federal St. 42°21′14″N 71°03′23″W	Downtown		
137	United States Post Office, Courthouse, and Federal Building	United States Post Office, Courthouse, and Federal Building	April 8, 2011 (#11000160)	5 Post Office Square; 42°21′26″N 71°03′25″W	Downtown		
138	USS Cassin Young (destroyer)	USS Cassin Young (destroyer)	January 14, 1986 (#86000084)	Charlestown Navy Yard; 42°22′17″N 71°03′18″W	Charlestown		
139	U.S.S. Constitution	U.S.S. Constitution	October 15, 1966 (#66000789)	Boston Naval Shipyard; 42°22′21″N 71°03′25″W	Charlestown		
140	Vermont Building	Vermont Building	November 13, 1984 (#84000421)	6–12 Thacher St. 42°21′56″N 71°03′28″W	North End		
141	Washington Street Theatre District	Washington Street Theatre District	March 19, 1979 (#79000370)	511–559 Washington St. 42°21′14″N 71°03′46″W	Theatre District		
142	West Street District	West Street District	December 9, 1980 (#80000455)	West St. 42°21′18″N 71°03′49″W	Downtown		
143	Wigglesworth Building	Wigglesworth Building	October 21, 1982 (#82000486)	89-83 Franklin St. 42°21′18″N 71°03′29″W	Downtown		
144	Wilbur Theatre	Wilbur Theatre	December 9, 1980 (#80000443)	244–250 Tremont St. 42°21′02″N 71°03′56″W	Theatre District		
145	Winthrop Building	Winthrop Building	April 18, 1974 (#74000392)	7 Water St. 42°21′27″N 71°03′29″W	Downtown		
146	Jacob Wirth Buildings	Jacob Wirth Buildings	December 9, 1980 (#80000442)	June 25, 2024	31–39 Stuart St. 42°21′04″N 71°03′52″W		Destroyed in a fire in 2024.
147	Youth's Companion Building	Youth's Companion Building	May 2, 1974 (#74000393)	209 Columbus Ave. 42°20′54″N 71°04′22″W	Back Bay		
148	YWCA Boston	YWCA Boston	March 3, 2004 (#04000119)	140 Clarendon St. 42°21′01″N 71°04′33″W	Back Bay	Neoclassical building of YWCA Boston.	

== Former listing ==
	Name on the Register	Image	Date listed	Date removed	Location	City or town	Description
1	Alice S. Wentworth (schooner)		May 24, 1973 (#73002284)	September 16, 1974	Pier 4, Northern Ave.		Destroyed in a storm in 1974.

== See also ==
- List of National Historic Landmarks in Massachusetts
- National Register of Historic Places listings in Suffolk County, Massachusetts
