= Quincy Grammar School =

- U.S. National Register of Historic Places
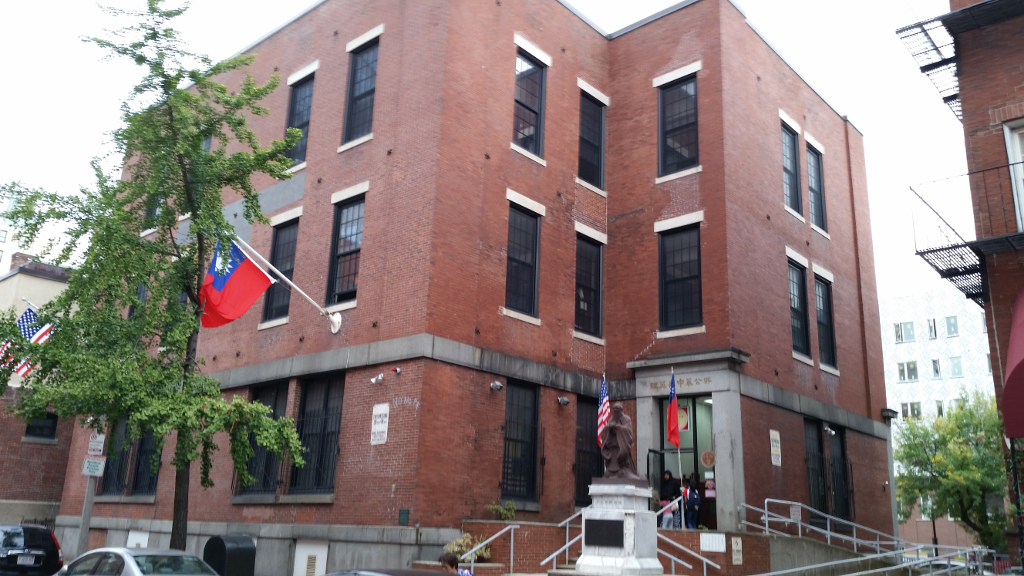

- Location within Boston Location within Massachusetts Location within the United States
- Location: 88-90 Tyler St., Boston, Massachusetts
- Coordinates: 42°20′56″N 71°03′41″W
- Built: 1859
- Architect: Gridley James Fox Bryant
- Architectural style: Italianate
- NRHP reference No.: 100001458
- Added to NRHP: August 1, 2017

The Quincy Grammar School is a historic former school building at 88-90 Tyler Street in the Chinatown neighborhood of Boston, Massachusetts. It is a three-story red brick building, designed by Gridley James Fox Bryant. It was built in 1859, a reconstruction to original plans after fire leveled the first structure, built in 1848. Originally four stories in height, the top floor collapsed during the Great New England Hurricane of 1938. The building is historically significant as a major element in the education of Boston's immigrant Chinese community during the early 20th century. It is now owned by the Chinese Consolidated Benevolent Association of Boston, which operates it as a community center.

The building was listed on the National Register of Historic Places in 2017.

== See also ==
- National Register of Historic Places listings in northern Boston, Massachusetts
