= Textile District =

- U.S. National Register of Historic Places
- U.S. Historic district
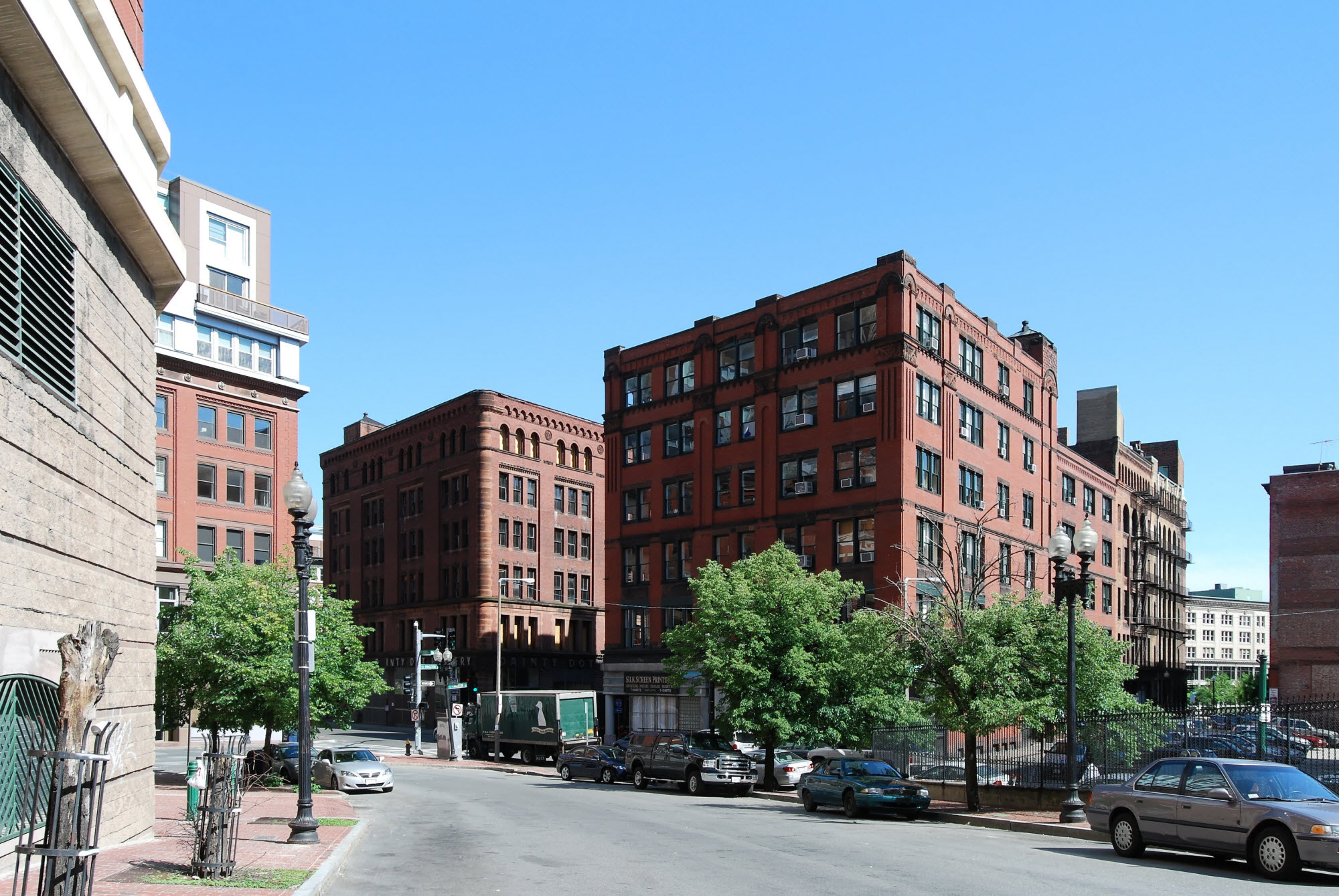
- Essex Street

- Location within Boston Location within Massachusetts Location within the United States
- Location: Boston, Massachusetts
- Coordinates: 42°21′9.18″N 71°3′36.82″W
- Area: 2.77 acres (1.12 ha)
- Architect: Multiple
- Architectural style: Classical Revival, Romanesque, Gothic Revival
- NRHP reference No.: 90001757
- Added to NRHP: November 29, 1990

The Textile District is a historic district encompassing a cluster of commercial buildings in the central business district of Boston, Massachusetts. It consists of properties roughly on Essex Street from Phillips Square to Columbia Street and Chauncy Street from Phillips Square to Rowe Place. This area was the center of Boston's dry goods commercial business, and was developed between 1888 and 1922. Most of the buildings are between five and eight stories, and were architect-designed to serve mercantile interests. The district's oldest building is the 1889 Romanesque Revival Auchmuty Building at 104-122 Kingston Street.

The district was added to the National Register of Historic Places in 1990.

Almost all textile stores and factories have now closed—most were family-run businesses without heirs, and some closed due to competition from large superstores such as JoAnn Fabrics. Winmill Fabrics on Chauncy Street is one of the few stores still remaining.

== See also ==
- National Register of Historic Places listings in northern Boston, Massachusetts
