= Building at 138–142 Portland Street =

- U.S. National Register of Historic Places
- U.S. Historic district – Contributing property
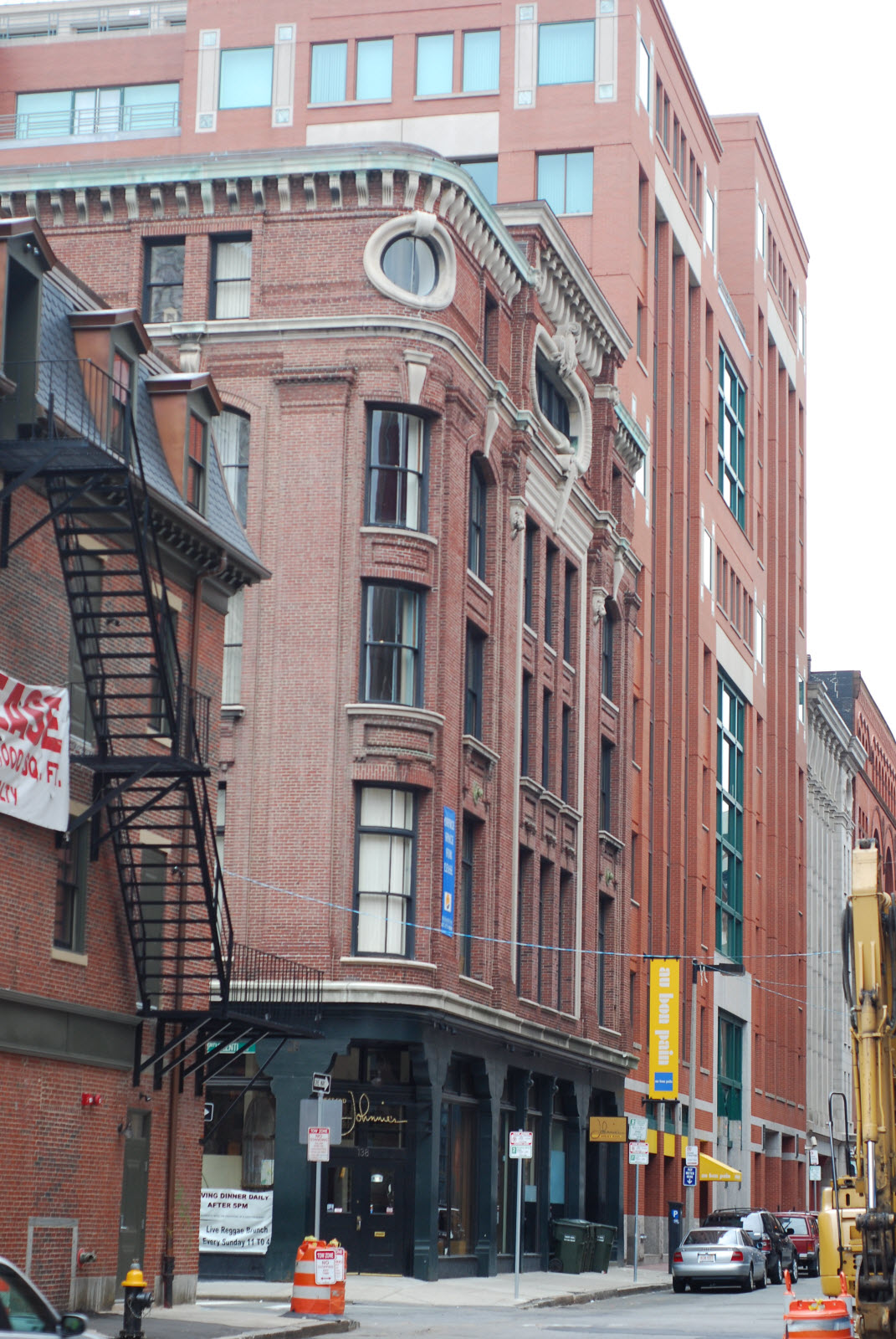

- Location within Boston Location within Massachusetts Location within the United States
- Location: 138–142 Portland Street, Boston, Massachusetts
- Coordinates: 42°21′51″N 71°3′43″W
- Built: 1896
- Architect: Stephen R.H. Codman
- Architectural style: Beaux Arts
- Part of: Bulfinch Triangle Historic District (ID86000274)
- NRHP reference No.: 85002015

Significant dates
- Added to NRHP: September 5, 1985
- Designated CP: February 27, 1986

138–142 Portland Street is a historic commercial building located at the address of the same name in Boston, Massachusetts.

== Description and history ==
The five-story, Beaux Arts style building was designed by Stephen Codman and built in 1896. Codman later collaborated with the French architect and MIT professor Constant-Désiré Despradelle under the firm name Codman & Despradelle, producing several other significant buildings in Boston including the Berkeley Building (1905) on Boylston Street, considered one of the finest examples of Beaux-Arts architecture in the city. The building was constructed for owner Catherine E. Tarbell and the Boston branch of the National Casket Company moved in as a tenant shortly after its completion, eventually becoming the largest manufacturer and supplier of caskets in New England by 1906. The building benefited from rail access for regional shipping in its early years.. The first floor has modern storefronts; the next three levels have brick pilasters separating the window bays with cast stone architraves. A cornice line separates the fifth level from the lower ones, and has oxeye windows at the building's rounded corners, and a dentillated cornice. It has also been classified as a Classical Revival building.

The building was listed on the National Register of Historic Places on September 5, 1985, and included in the Bulfinch Triangle Historic District on February 27, 1986.

== See also ==
- National Register of Historic Places listings in northern Boston, Massachusetts
