= Traffic Tunnel Administration Building =

- Boston Police Station Number One/Traffic Tunnel Administration Building
- U.S. National Register of Historic Places
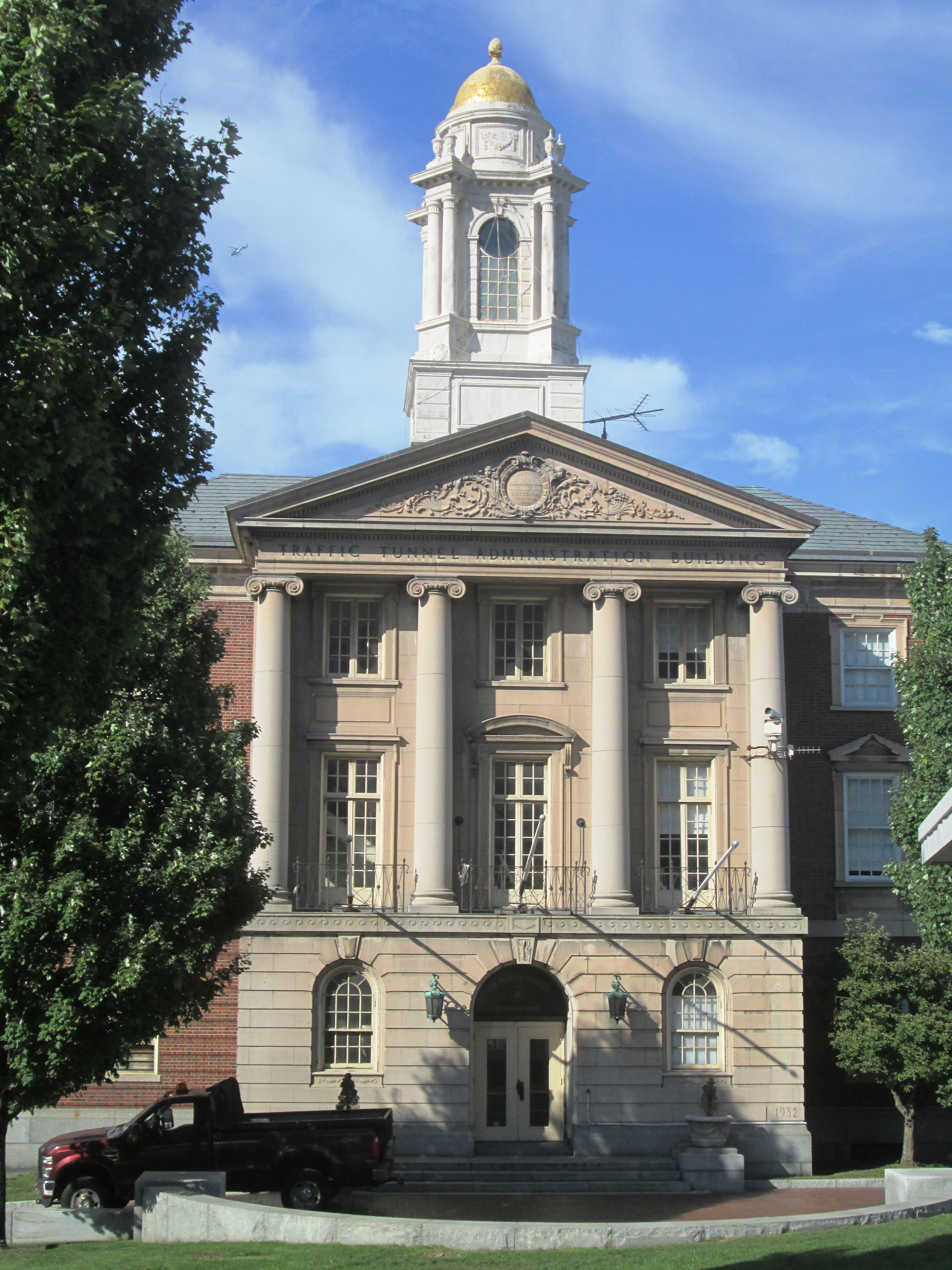
- (2017)

- Location within Boston Location within Massachusetts
- Location: 128, 150 North & 130-140 Richmond St., North End, Boston, Massachusetts
- Coordinates: 42°21′45″N 71°3′17″W
- Architect: John M. Gray
- Architectural style: Georgian Revival
- NRHP reference No.: 15000048
- Added to NRHP: March 3, 2015

The Traffic Tunnel Administration Building, also known as Boston Police Station Number One, is a historic government building in the North End of Boston, Massachusetts. The building occupies a prominent position facing North End Park off the Rose Kennedy Greenway, and is bounded by the park, North Street, and the trench carrying the exit point of the Sumner Tunnel. The Georgian Revival building was designed by Salem architect John M. Gray and built in 1931. The southern facade, facing the park, was originally used as the administrative facilities for Boston's tunnels, and the eastern facade provided access to the police station. The administration facilities are now used by the local police union, and the police station now houses the North Bennet Street School.

The building was listed on the National Register of Historic Places in 2015.

== See also ==
- National Register of Historic Places listings in northern Boston, Massachusetts
