= Terminal Storage Warehouse District =

Historic district in Massachusetts, United States

- U.S. National Register of Historic Places
- U.S. Historic district
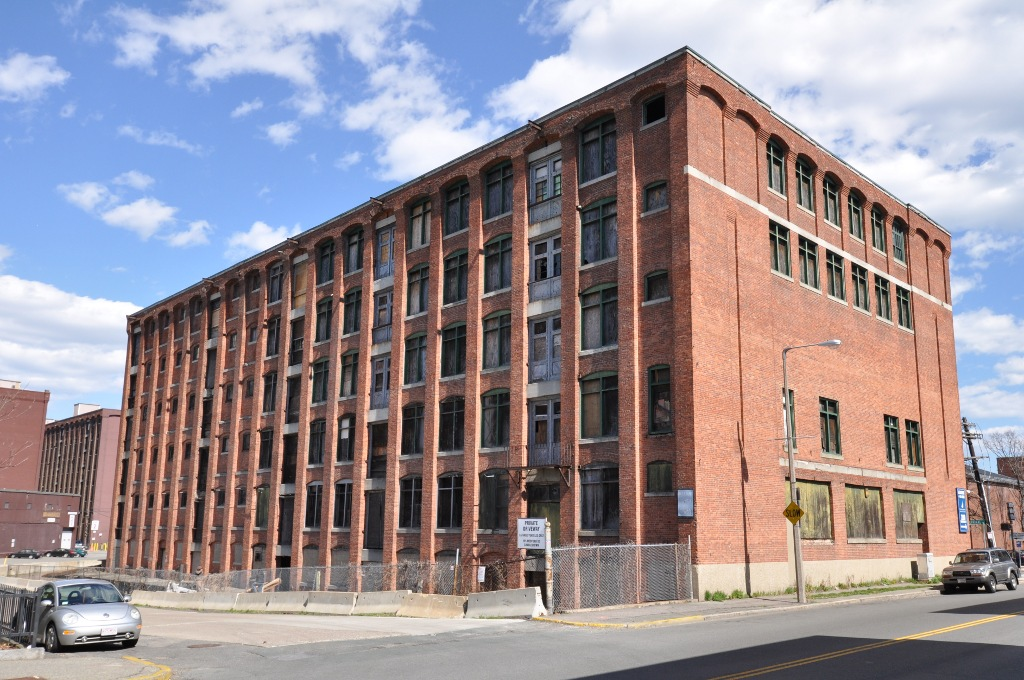

- Location within Massachusetts
- Location: 267–281 Medford Street, 40 & 50 Terminal Street; Charlestown, Massachusetts
- Coordinates: 42°22′51″N 71°03′42″W
- NRHP reference No.: 12000099
- Added to NRHP: March 12, 2012

The Terminal Storage Warehouse District is located at Medford and Terminal Streets in the Charlestown neighborhood of Boston, Massachusetts. It includes three large brick warehouse buildings which were built between 1910 and 1913. They are rare surviving elements of the commercial development of the Charlestown waterfront early in the 20th century. They were built by two separate companies which had common ownership. The buildings at 40 and 50 Terminal Street were built by the Terminal Wharf & Railroad Warehouse Company, and that at 267-281 Medford Street was built by the Terminal Storage Warehouse Company. They were built to serve as storage facilities for the transhipment by rail and ship of goods through the port. The buildings were vacated in 1984, and are being rehabilitated after many years of vacancy.

In 2014, the warehouse at 267-281 Medford Street was renovated into apartments after a 17-year-long legal battle related to the building's location in the Terminal Storage Warehouse District and its proximity to the waterfront. During the renovations, much of the original longleaf pine decking of the building was salvaged and recycled.

The district was listed on the National Register of Historic Places on March 12, 2012.

== See also ==
- National Register of Historic Places listings in northern Boston, Massachusetts
