= Ozias Goodwin House =

Historic house in Massachusetts, United States

- U.S. National Register of Historic Places
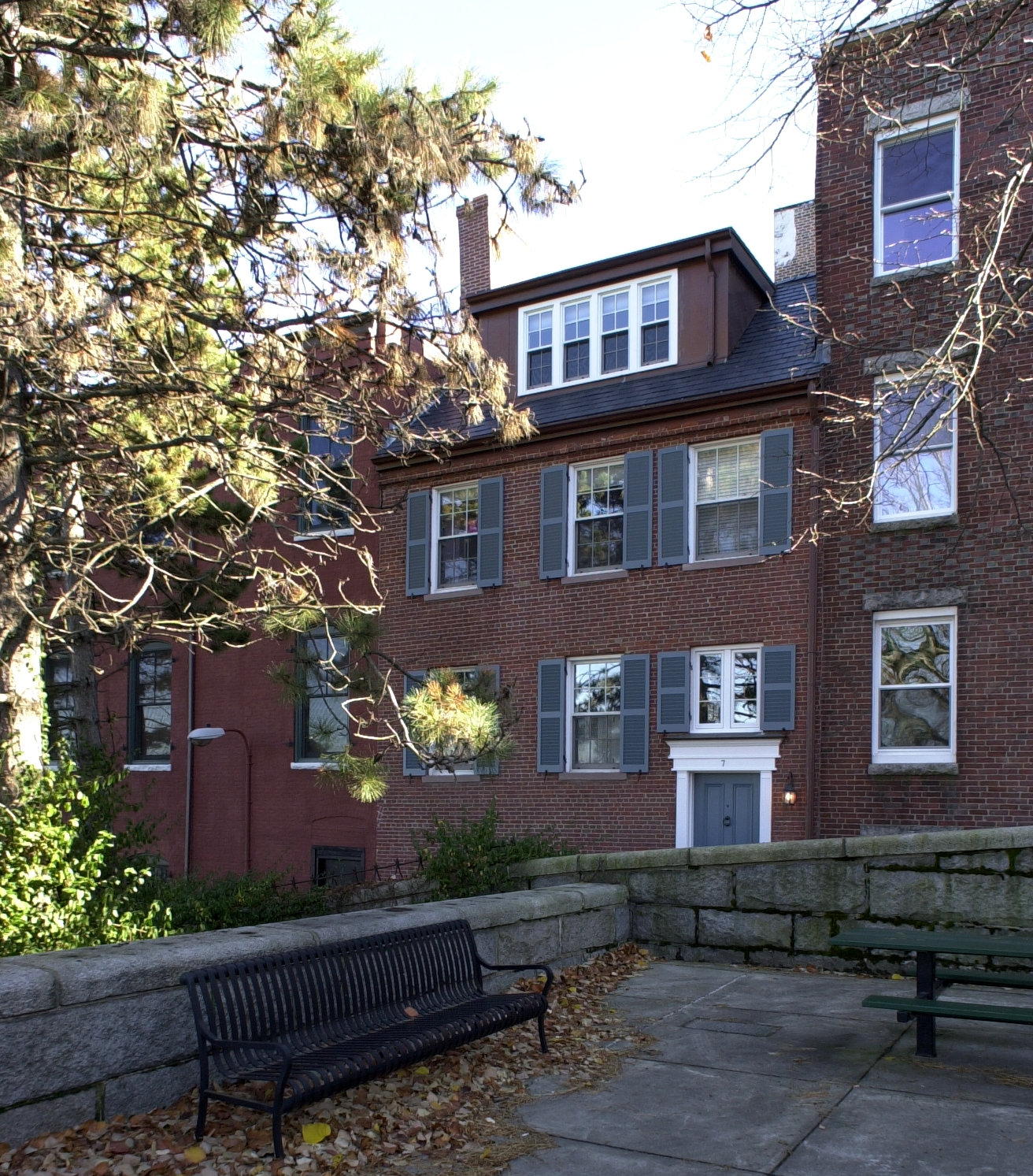

- Location within Boston Location within Massachusetts Location within the United States
- Location: 7 Jackson Ave., Boston, Massachusetts
- Coordinates: 42°22′3.6″N 71°3′18.1″W
- Area: less than one acre
- Built: 1795
- Architectural style: Early Republic, Federal
- NRHP reference No.: 88000908
- Added to NRHP: June 23, 1988

The Ozias Goodwin House is a historic house at 7 Jackson Avenue in the North End of Boston, Massachusetts. It is a two-story brick rowhouse, three bays wide, with brownstone window sills and lintels. The second floor windows are set just below the eave, a typical Federal period detail. The house was built in 1795, and is one of Boston's rare surviving Federal period houses. It was owned by Ozias Goodwin a ship's captain active in the East Indies trade.

The house was listed on the National Register of Historic Places in 1988.

== See also ==
- National Register of Historic Places listings in northern Boston, Massachusetts
