= Beach-Knapp District =

Historic district in Massachusetts, United States

- U.S. National Register of Historic Places
- U.S. Historic district
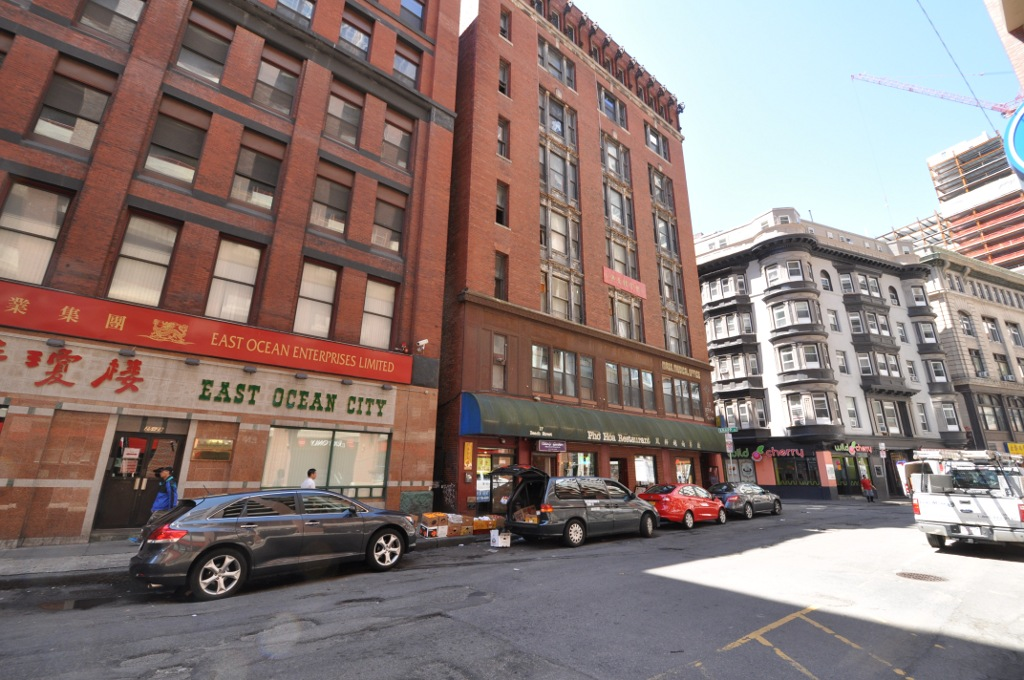
- Beach Street at Knapp; the three left-most buildings are in the district.

- Location within Boston Location within Massachusetts Location within the United States
- Location: Boston, Massachusetts
- Coordinates: 42°21′4″N 71°3′44″W
- Built: 1835
- Architect: Multiple
- Architectural style: Greek Revival, Late Victorian
- MPS: Boston Theatre MRA
- NRHP reference No.: 80000462
- Added to NRHP: December 9, 1980

The Beach-Knapp District encompasses a collection of six 19th-century buildings in the Chinatown neighborhood of Boston, Massachusetts. It is centered at the corner of Beach and Knapp Streets, and includes three buildings on the south side of Beach Street, and three on the east side of Knapp. The buildings encapsulate the transition of the area from a predominantly residential area to a mixed residential-light industrial area in the 19th century. At 5 and 7 Knapp Street stand two Greek Revival residential structures, both built in the 1830s. The four story Renaissaince Revival building at 7-15 Beach Street was built c. 1885, and was historically used as a hotel. The other three buildings, 17-23 Beach, 25-29 Beach, and 9-23 Knapp, are all commercial buildings dating between 1885 and 1906; two of them were designed by Shepley, Rutan and Coolidge.

The district was listed on the National Register of Historic Places in 1980.

== See also ==
- National Register of Historic Places listings in northern Boston, Massachusetts
