= Theodore Lyman School =

Historic place in Massachusetts, United States

- U.S. National Register of Historic Places
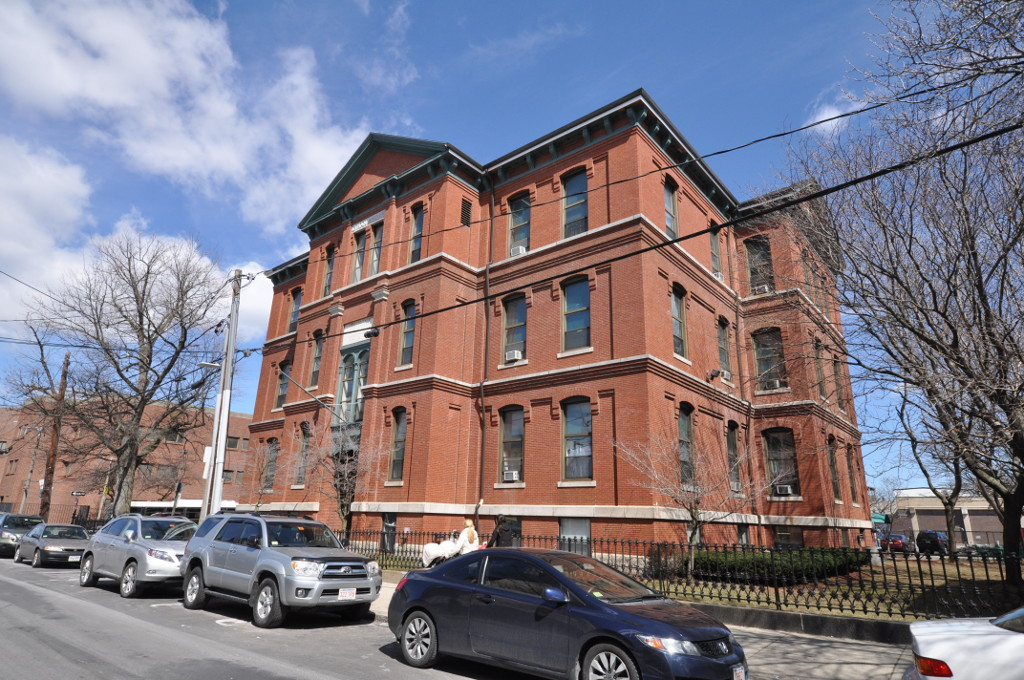

- Location within Boston Location within Massachusetts Location within the United States
- Location: Boston, Massachusetts
- Coordinates: 42°22′19″N 71°02′16″W
- Built: 1869
- Architect: Gridley James Fox Bryant
- Architectural style: Italianate
- NRHP reference No.: 14000975
- Added to NRHP: December 2, 2014

The Theodore Lyman School is a historic former school building at 30 Gove Street in the East Boston neighborhood of Boston, Massachusetts. It is a three-story red brick building, designed by Gridley James Fox Bryant. It was built in 1869, and rebuilt after a fire severely damaged it just two years later. The school was named for Boston's fifth mayor, Theodore Lyman (1792-1849), and was a major element of East Boston's development in the mid-19th century. The school served as a public elementary school in the 1970s until damaged by fire and close in 1980. The building was converted into elderly housing in 1984.

The building was listed on the National Register of Historic Places in 2014.

== See also ==
- National Register of Historic Places listings in northern Boston, Massachusetts
