= George A. Scigliano =

American lawyer

Member of the Massachusetts House of Representatives from the 6th Suffolk district
- In office November 1903 – June 1906

Member of the Boston Common Council
- In office 1901–1903

Personal details
- Born: August 26, 1874 Boston, Massachusetts, U.S.
- Died: June 17, 1906 (aged 31) Millbury, Massachusetts, U.S.
- Resting place: St. John's Cemetery, Worcester, Massachusetts
- Party: Democratic
- Spouse: Florence
- Children: Florence, Jessica, George Jr.
- Education: Boston University School of Law
- Known for: Activism, politics

George A. Scigliano (/ˌʃiːliˈɑːnoʊ/ SHEE-lee-AH-noh; August 26, 1874 – June 17, 1906) was an influential leader in the Italian-American community of Boston, Massachusetts. As a member of the Boston Common Council and Massachusetts legislature, he worked to improve the lives of Italian immigrants.

== Biography ==
Scigliano was born on August 26, 1874, in Boston's North End. His parents were immigrants from the town of Scigliano in the Cosenza province of Calabria, southern Italy. After attending the Eliot School and the Boston University School of Law, he was admitted to the bar in 1899.

In 1900, Scigliano was elected to the Boston Common Council, where he served three one-year terms. In 1903, he was elected to the Massachusetts House of Representatives, where he served until his death in 1906. While in office, he introduced legislation to regulate the loosely run "immigrant banks" which were notorious for cheating poorly educated Italian immigrants out of their savings. He also filed a bill to abolish the exploitative padrone system of employment, in which unsuspecting immigrants were charged exorbitant fees for jobs and housing and bilked out of most of their earnings.

Scigliano founded the Italian Protective League of Boston, a benevolent society for new immigrants; helped form the first Italian labor union in the North End; worked to defeat a bill that would have required workers to be naturalized; helped establish a cemetery for Italians in Forest Hills; and established October 12 as Columbus Day in Massachusetts. He also wrote and spoke eloquently in defense of Italians at a time when they were often characterized as an undesirable or criminal class. For example, in 1901, when Senator George Frisbie Hoar stated publicly that Italian and Portuguese immigrants were "absolutely unfit" for U.S. citizenship, Scigliano's rebuttal was published in several Boston newspapers.

The Italian, a people descended from the ancient Roman dynasty which conquered all of the then known world and educated it; which entered and conquered England at a time when the ancestors of our able senator were roaming savages, opened up their country and taught them the meaning of citizenship as comprehended by a civilized people, has been violently attacked by him...

In recognition of his service to Italian-Americans, Scigliano was made a cavalier of the crown by King Victor Emmanuel III of Italy in 1905.

Scigliano died of a kidney ailment in Millbury, Massachusetts, on June 17, 1906, at the age of 31. He was survived by his wife and three children. His funeral procession was one of the largest in the history of the North End.

After his death, North End residents lobbied to build a monument to him in the historic North Square and rename it Scigliano Square. Instead, the North End Park near Copp's Hill was renamed Scigliano Park in his honor.
