= La Famiglia Giorgio's =

Italian restaurant in Boston, MA, USA

- Location within Boston

Restaurant information
- Food type: Italian
- Location: 112 Salem St, Boston, Massachusetts
- Coordinates: 42.3645331°N 71.0555904°W
- Website: www.lafamigliagiorgios.com

La Famiglia Giorgio’s is an Italian restaurant in the North End neighborhood of Boston.

They were on Money Inc’s list of 20 Best Italian Restaurants in Boston.

== Arson ==
Albert L. Giorgio of Revere, Massachusetts, was charged by federal prosecutors for helping his brother Steven set fire to the restaurant for the insurance money and Steven ultimately died. Albert was charged with arson resulting in death, arson conspiracy, mail fraud and use of fire to commit mail fraud for the March 2002 two-alarm fire.

Stephen owed gambling debts to an alleged mob captain Carmen “Big Cheese’ DiNunzio and he would get the deed to Stephen’s nearby deli to repay the debts.

== Lasagne Challenge ==
For more than 23 years, more than 500,000 people took up a challenge to eat a six-pound, 7,000 calorie portion of lasagne. The 15 people who passed it had the meal for free and those who failed had to pay $40.90.
