= Ebenezer Clough =

American stonemason

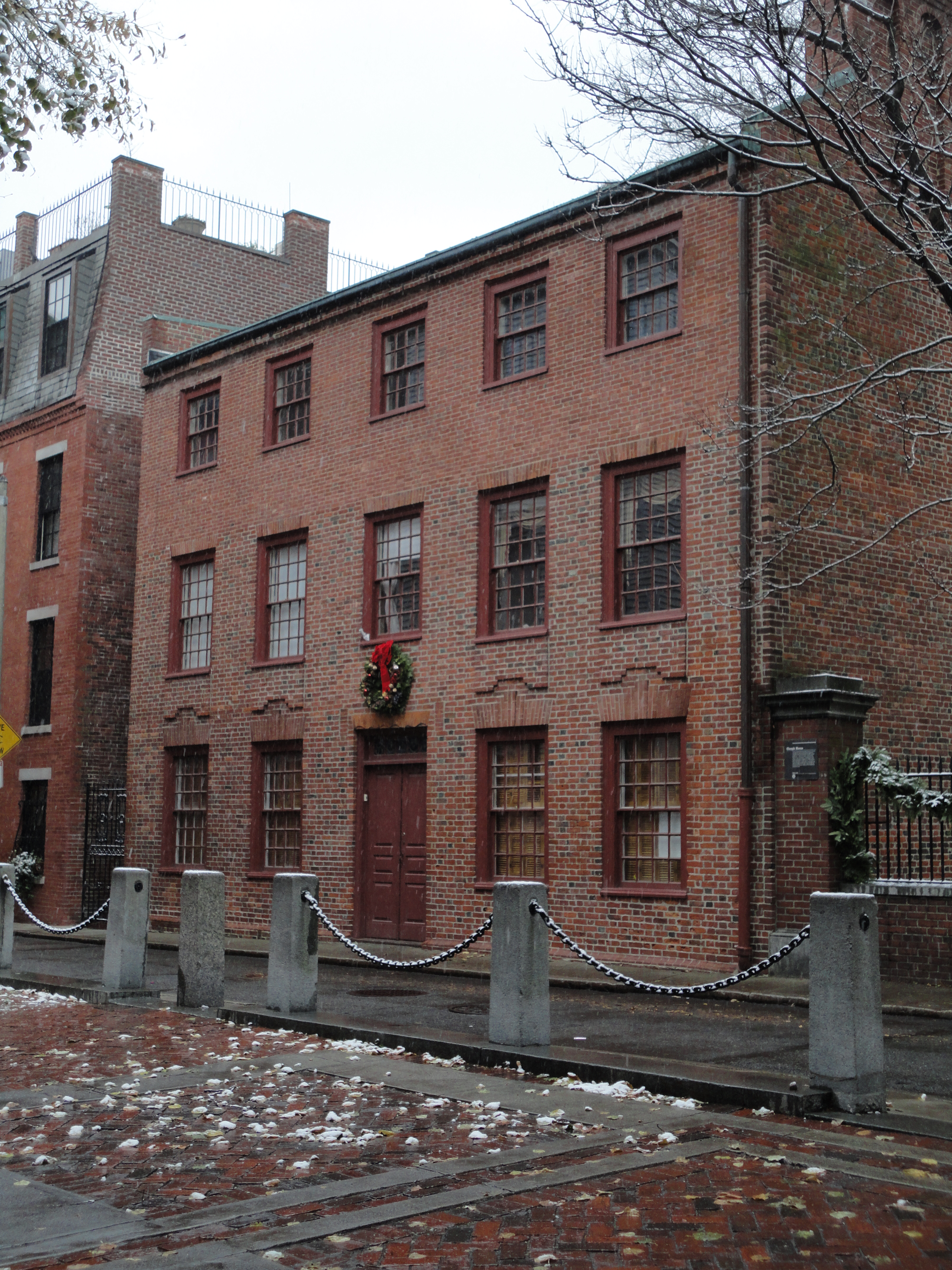
- Clough House, pictured in 2012
- Died: 1724; Boston, Province of Massachusetts Bay

Ebenezer Clough (died 1724) was an American master mason. His most notable work is the Old North Church, in the North End of Boston, Massachusetts, which he helped build in 1723. It is now the oldest extant church in the city and is a National Historic Landmark. It is believed he was also involved in the construction of other brick buildings in the city, including Union Oyster House and the Pierce-Hitchborn House.

== Career ==
Before he began work on the Old North Church, in 1715 Clough built his family home—today known as the Clough House—which stands behind the Old North Church. He also laid out Unity Street, on which the house stands.

== Personal life ==
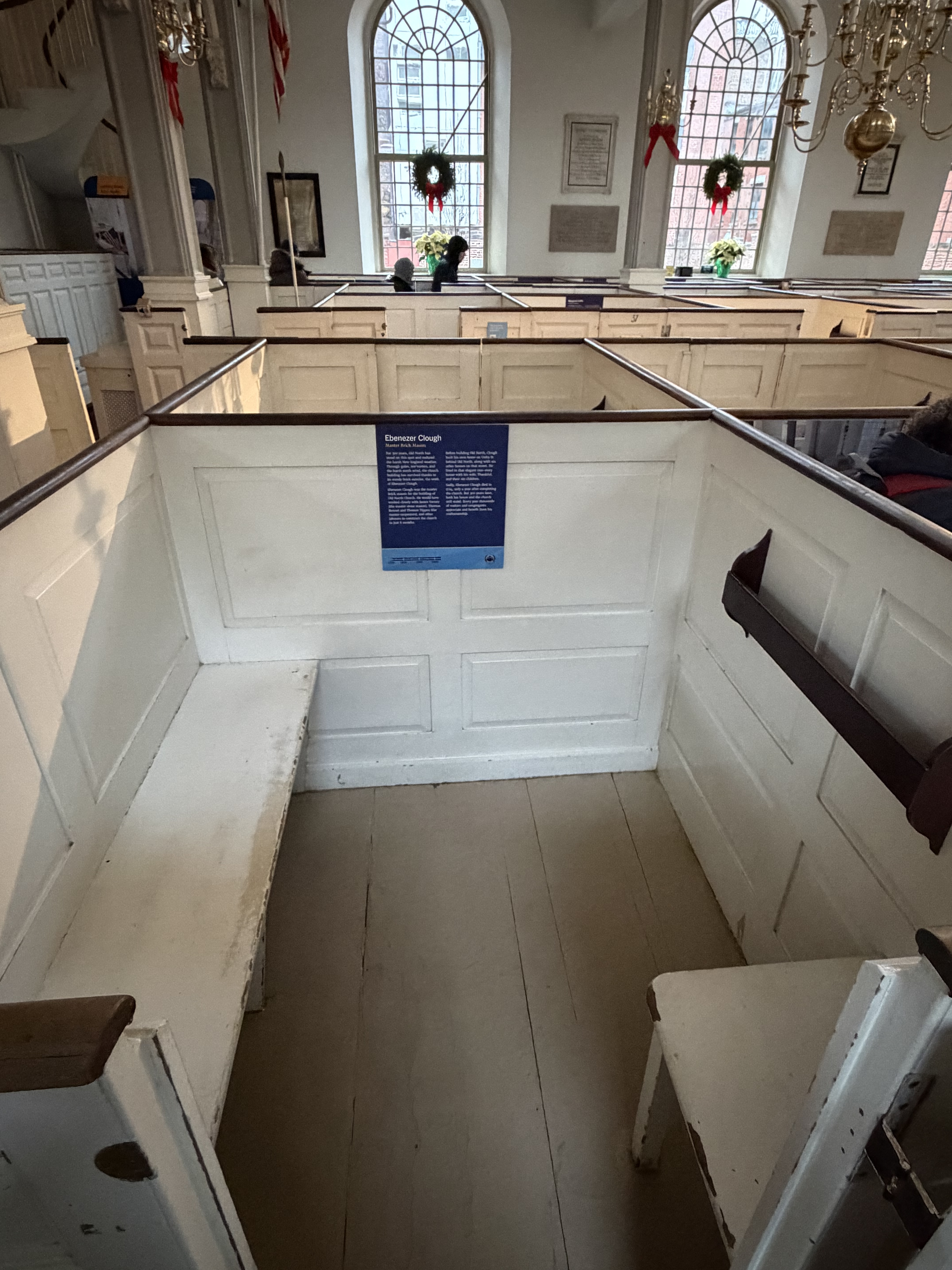
Clough’s pew at Old North Church

Clough married Thankful, with whom he had a family, including John, who was born in 1719 or 1720.

He was a member of the Sons of Liberty and took part in the Boston Tea Party of 1773. He was a city selectman between 1719 and 1723.

== Death ==
Clough died in 1724, a year after the Old North Church was completed. He was survived by his wife.
