= Elliott School =

Elliott School may refer to:

- Elliott School of International Affairs, part of George Washington University, Washington, D.C
- Elliott School, Putney, a school in Putney, England, founded in 1904, which became the Ark Putney Academy in 2012

== See also ==
- Eliot School rebellion, a 19th-century incident involved in debate on what Christian instruction would be available in American public schools
