= Regina Pizzeria =

American pizza chain

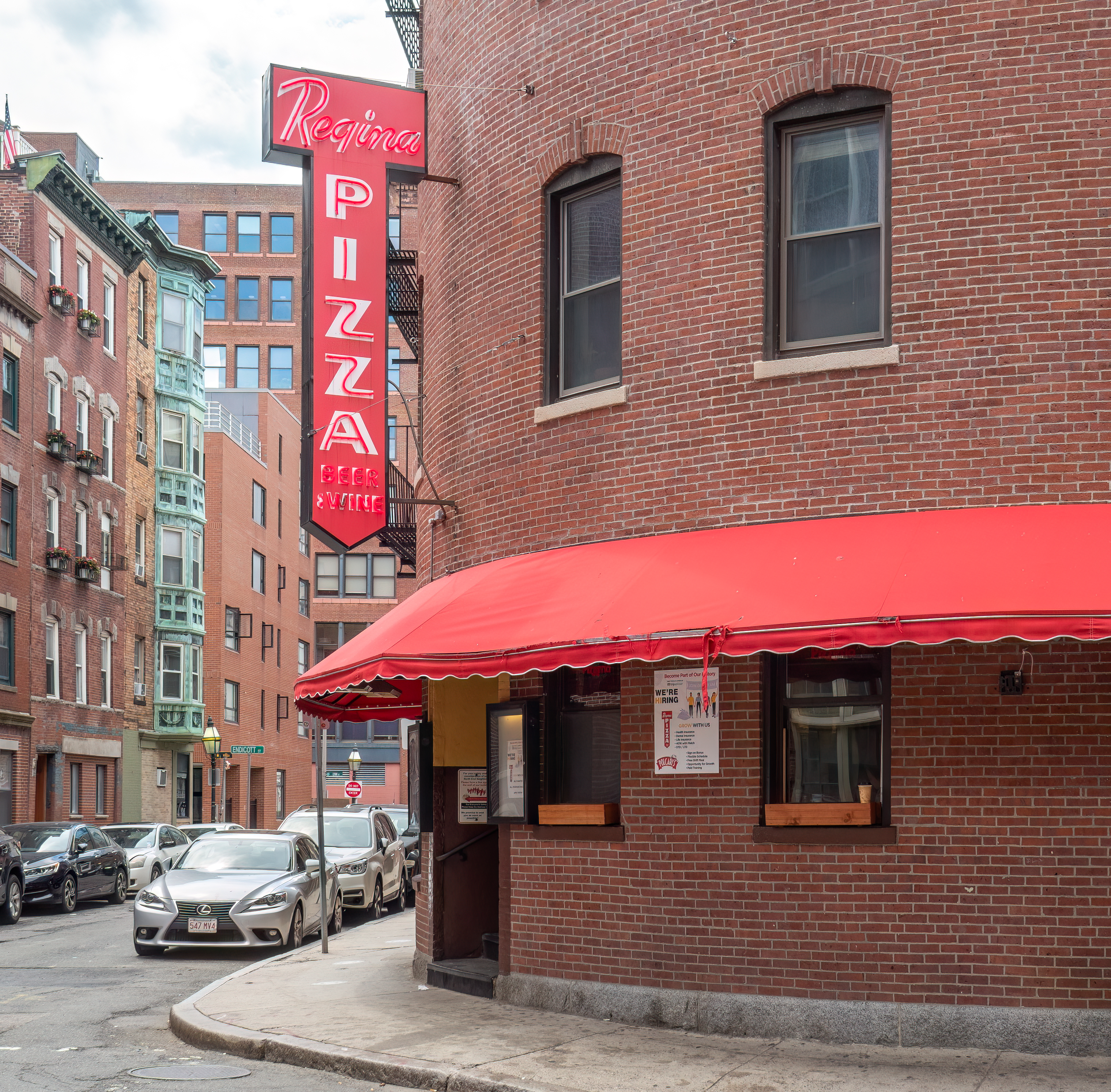
- Original pizzeria in the North End of Boston

Restaurant information
- Established: 1926; 100 years ago
- Food type: Italian, pizzeria
- Dress code: Casual
- Location: United States

Regina Pizzeria, also known as Pizzeria Regina, and originally called Regina Pizza, is a regional pizza chain in New England. The company was founded in 1926 by Luigi D'Auria in Boston's North End neighborhood. It has been run by the Polcari family since 1956. The chain is a part of Boston Restaurant Associates and is headquartered in Woburn, Massachusetts.

The Regina Pizzeria's first location, at 11 1/2 Thacher Street in Boston's North End, is the best known. The company also boasts that it makes its sausage and dough daily from fresh ingredients.

== History ==
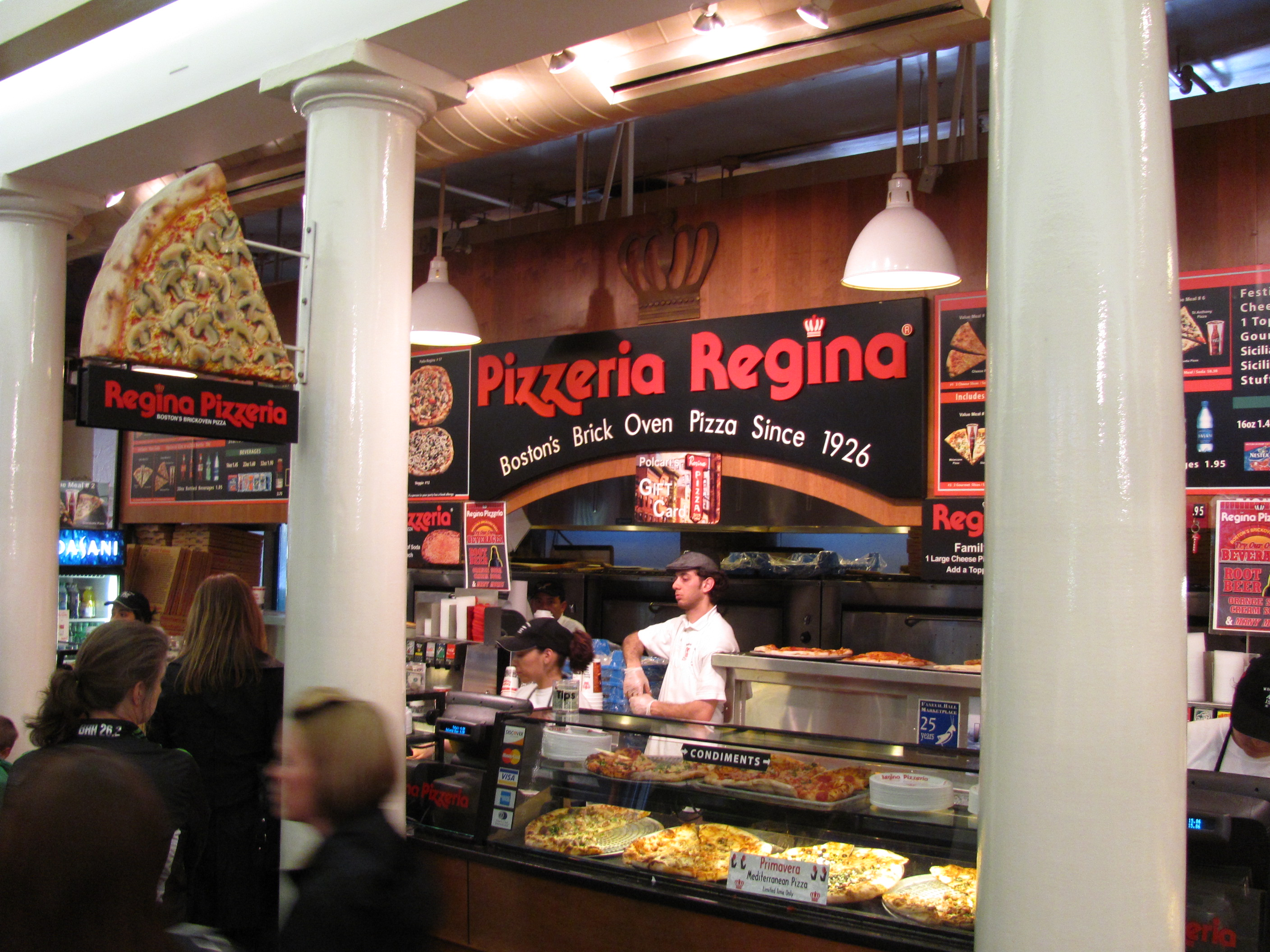
Location in Quincy Market in Boston

Regina Pizzeria was established in 1926 by Luigi D'Auria, originally under the name Regina Pizza ("Queen Pizza" in Italian). It is located at 11 1/2 Thacher Street in Boston's North End, and is Boston's oldest pizzeria. When D'Auria died he left the restaurant to his grandson, Luigi D'Auria. In 1956, the grandson sold Regina Pizza to the Polcari family, who have operated the restaurant since.

In May 2015, the parent company filed for bankruptcy protection, closing four underperforming locations (Emerald Square Mall in North Attleborough; Pheasant Lane Mall in Nashua; Mall of New Hampshire in Manchester; and the Arsenal Project Mall in Watertown) and saving $70,000 a month. They hoped to renegotiate leases at Independence Mall in Kingston, Liberty Tree Mall in Danvers, and Solomon Pond Mall in Marlborough.

In 2018, Regina Pizzeria was declared the best pizza restaurant in the United States by TripAdvisor. However, a Boston Globe critic pointed out that this is partly due to fame rather than quality.
