= Clough House =

Historic house in Boston, Massachusetts

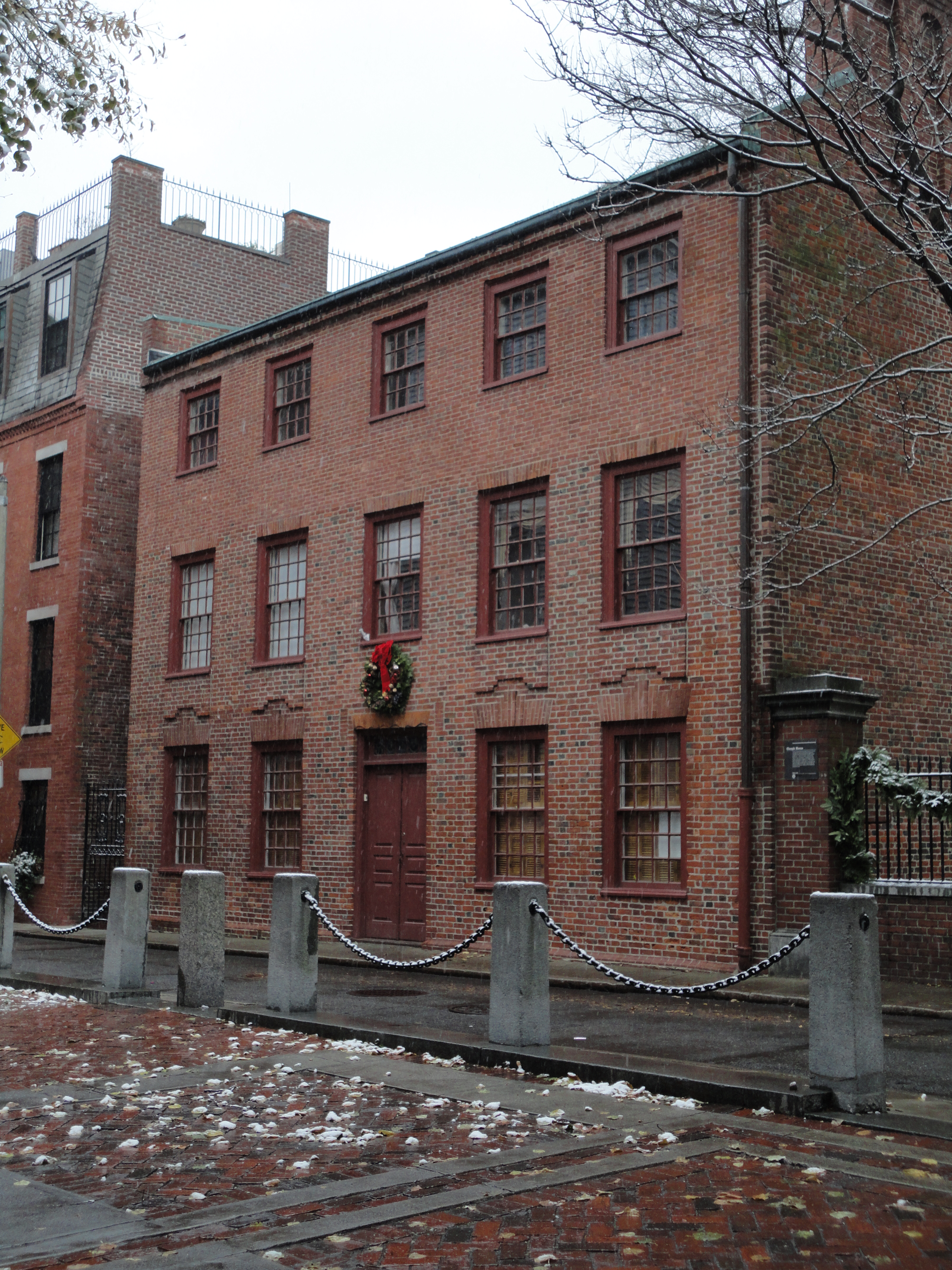
- Pictured in 2012
- Interactive map of the Clough House area

General information
- Location: 21 Unity Street, Boston, Massachusetts, U.S.
- Coordinates: 42.36604°N 71.05426°W
- Construction started: 1711
- Completed: 1715 (311 years ago)
- Renovated: 1959–1972

Technical details
- Floor count: 3 (2.5 originally)

The Clough House (also known as the Clough–Langdon House) is one of the oldest buildings in Boston, Massachusetts, United States. Located in the city's North End, the building was constructed in 1715 by housewright John Barret and brick mason Ebenezer Clough, who was also the first to live there. Clough also laid out Unity Street, which runs behind the Old North Church, on which the building stands. He built five other buildings on the street.

The building is estimated to be the sixth-oldest in Boston. Originally 2.5 stories, and part of a row house, a third level was added in 1806, shortly after which it became a tenement for immigrants settling in the North End.

The Clough House is one of three remaining brick structures that date to the first decades of the 1700s in Boston. The Old North Church purchased the property in 1959 and renovated the building. Work was completed in 1972. Today, the Clough House functions as an exhibit, gallery, and office space; housing the Printing Office of Edes and Gill and the Heritage Goods and Gifts shop.

== Occupants ==
Ebenezer Clough or, more likely, members of his family lived in the home until 1724, at which point they sold it to Ebenezer's son, John, and his wife, Susanna. They owned it for less than a year, selling it to John Brown and his family. Brown owned the property for around thirty years, after which it had a number of different owners in quick succession up until 1761, when Henry Roby (an heir of Joseph Pierce) bought it. The Roby family owned it for almost fifty years. From that point, it was used as a tenement for immigrants. Unusually for tenements in the North End, African Americans, Jews and Portuguese immigrants did not live at the Clough House. From the 1900s, only Italians and Italian Americans occupied the building.
