= Fulton-Commercial Streets District =

Historic district in Massachusetts, United States

- U.S. National Register of Historic Places
- U.S. Historic district
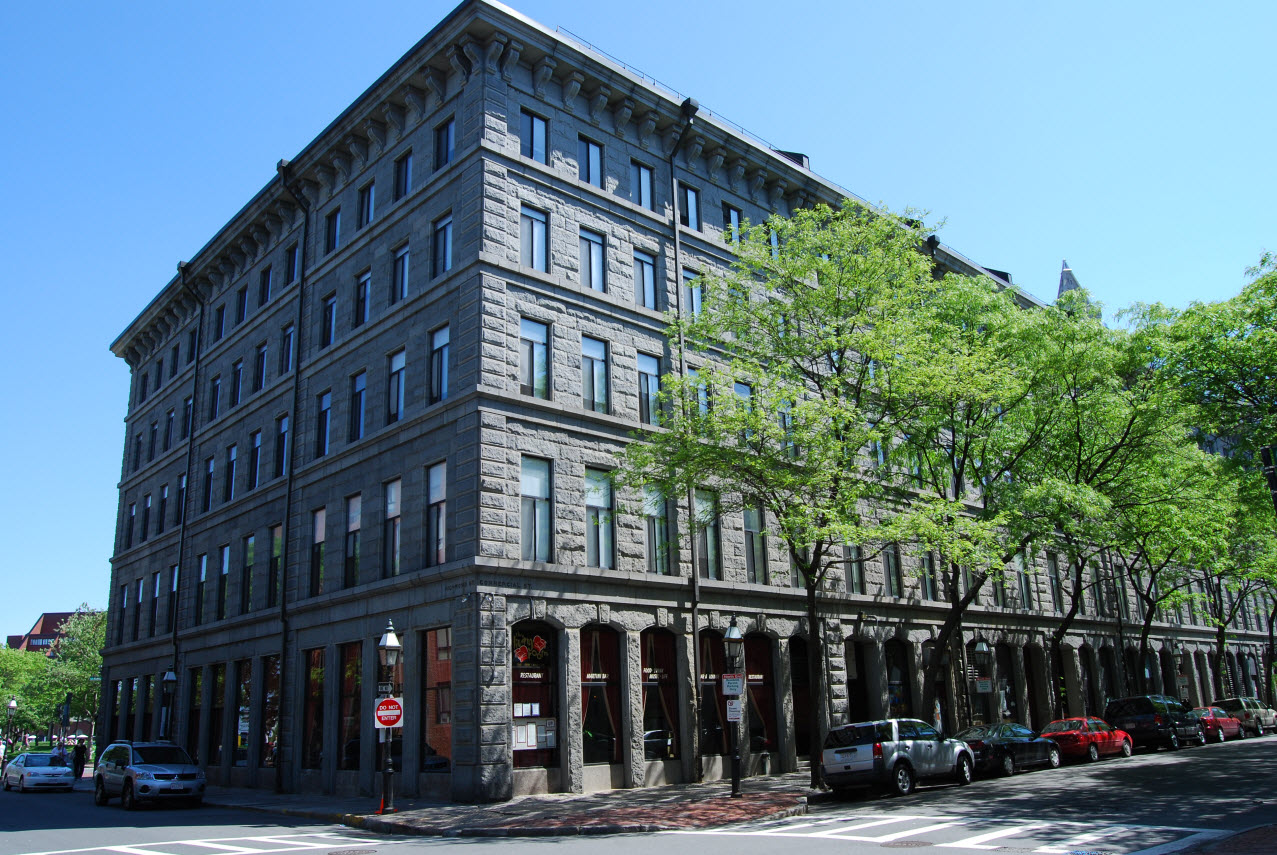
- Commercial Street view

- Location within Boston Location within Massachusetts Location within the United States
- Location: Boston, Massachusetts
- Coordinates: 42°21′43″N 71°3′12″W
- Architect: Multiple
- Architectural style: Renaissance
- NRHP reference No.: 73000319
- Added to NRHP: March 21, 1973

The Fulton-Commercial Streets District is a historic district encompassing a commercial area of the North End of Boston, Massachusetts. It is roughly bounded on the west by Cross Street, on the east by Lewis Street, on the north by Fulton Street, and on the south by Commercial and Mercantile Streets. It was developed during the second half of the 19th century on "made land" created by filling in the area just south of the Shawmut Peninsula as part of the Quincy Market development.

The district was added to the National Register of Historic Places in 1973, and expanded slightly in 2000.

== See also ==
- National Register of Historic Places listings in northern Boston, Massachusetts
