= Union Wharf =

- U.S. National Register of Historic Places
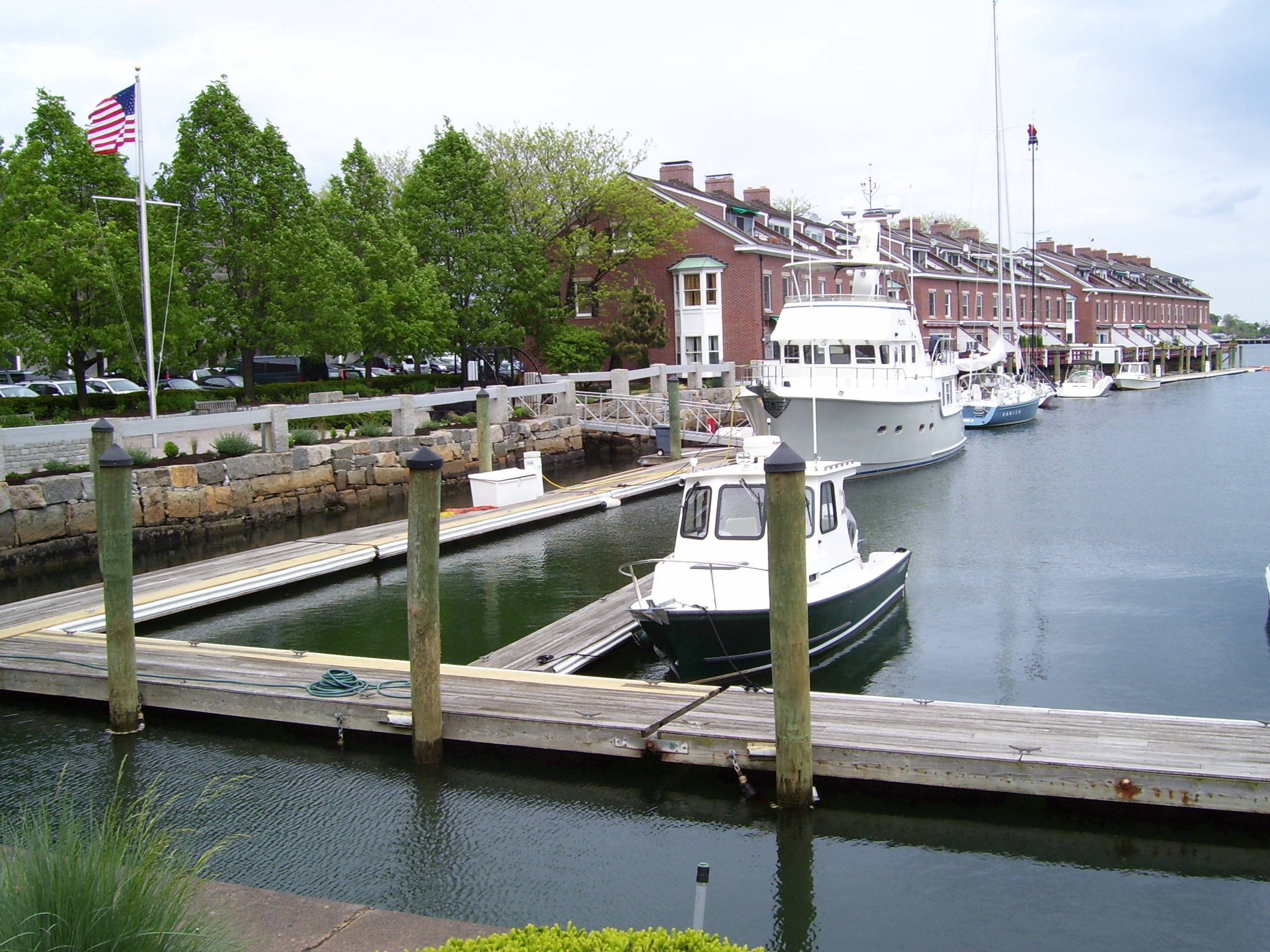

- Location within Boston Location within Massachusetts Location within the United States
- Location: Boston, Massachusetts
- Coordinates: 42°21′56″N 71°3′3″W
- Built: 1795
- NRHP reference No.: 80000669
- Added to NRHP: June 22, 1980

Union Wharf is an historic wharf at 295-353 Commercial Street in the North End of Boston, Massachusetts. The wharf began as a modest wooden structure in the late 18th century, and was developed with a complex of granite buildings roughly between 1830 and 1850. It was one of the major centers of trade on the Port of Boston in the mid-19th century, and served as a passenger terminal later in the 19th century.

The wharf and buildings were listed on the National Register of Historic Places in 1980.

== See also ==
- Port of Boston
- National Register of Historic Places listings in northern Boston, Massachusetts
