= North End, Boston =

Neighborhood in Boston, Massachusetts

North End
- Neighborhood of Boston
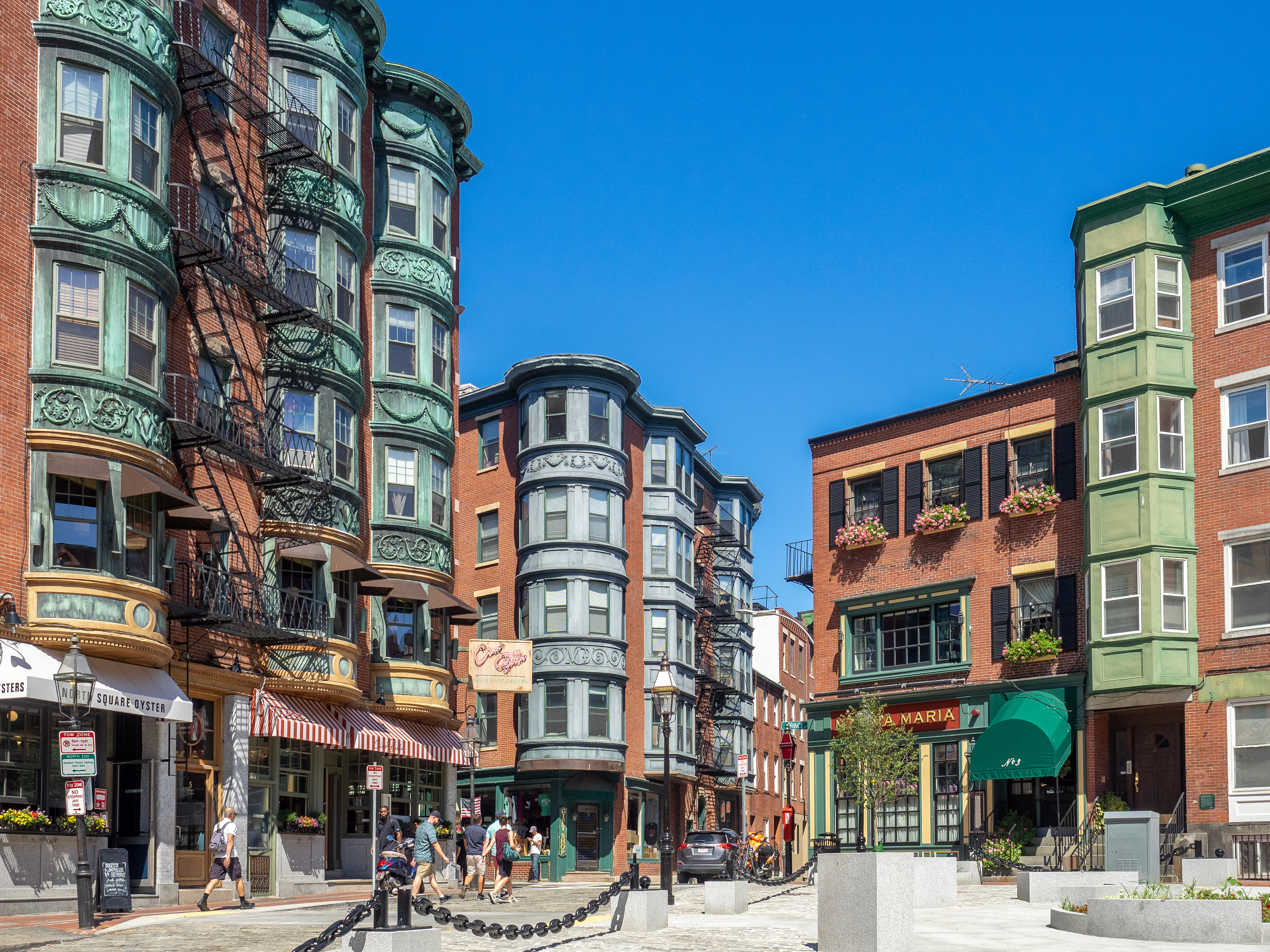
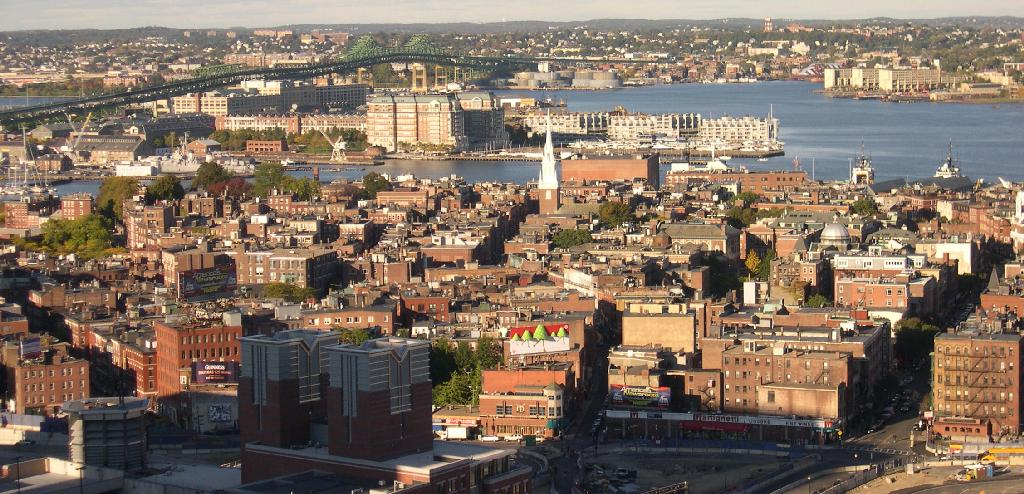
- Top: North Square. Bottom: aerial view of the North End
- Location in Boston, Massachusetts
- Coordinates: 42°21′54″N 71°03′16″W
- Country: United States
- State: Massachusetts
- County: Suffolk
- Neighborhood of: Boston

Area
  - Total: 0.366 sq mi (0.95 km^{2})
- Elevation: 27 ft (8.2 m)

Population (2010)
  - Total: 10,131
  - Density: 27,680.4/sq mi (10,687.5/km^{2})
- Time zone: UTC-5 (Eastern)
- ZIP Code: 02109, 02110, 02113
- Area code: 617 / 857
- GNIS feature ID: 607004
- Website: northendboston.com

The North End is a neighborhood of Boston, Massachusetts, United States. It is the city's oldest residential community, having been inhabited since it was colonized in the 1630s. It covers 0.36 square miles (0.93 km^{2}), but the neighborhood has nearly one hundred establishments and a variety of tourist attractions. It is known for its Italian American population and Italian restaurants.

== History ==
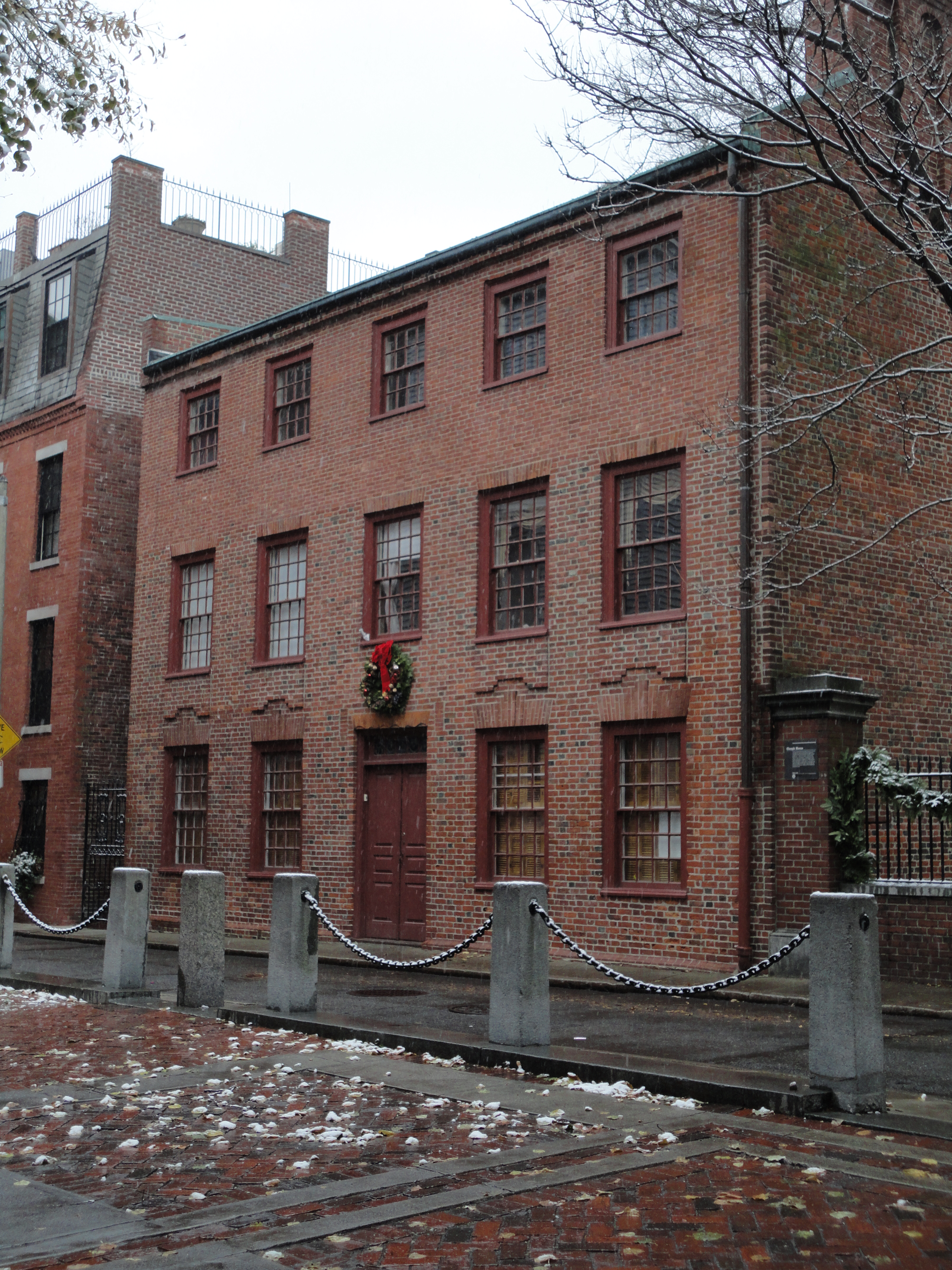
The Clough House, built in 1715

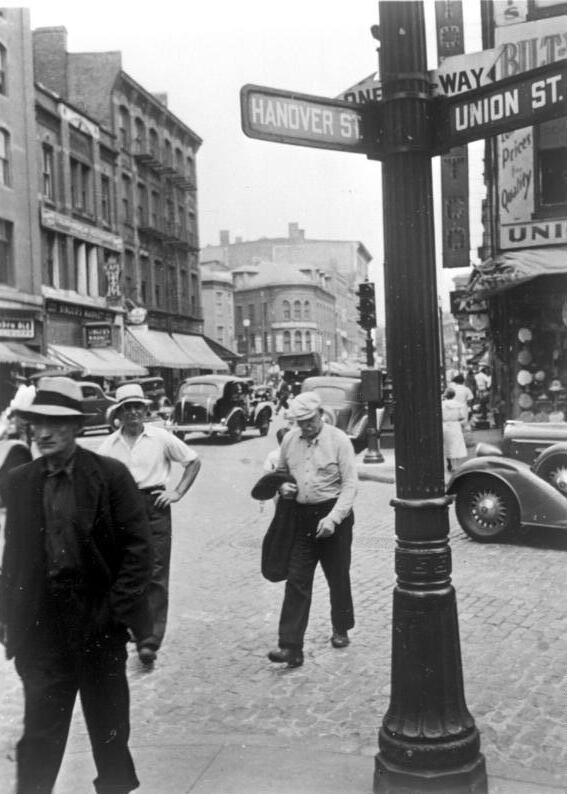
Hanover Street, 1930

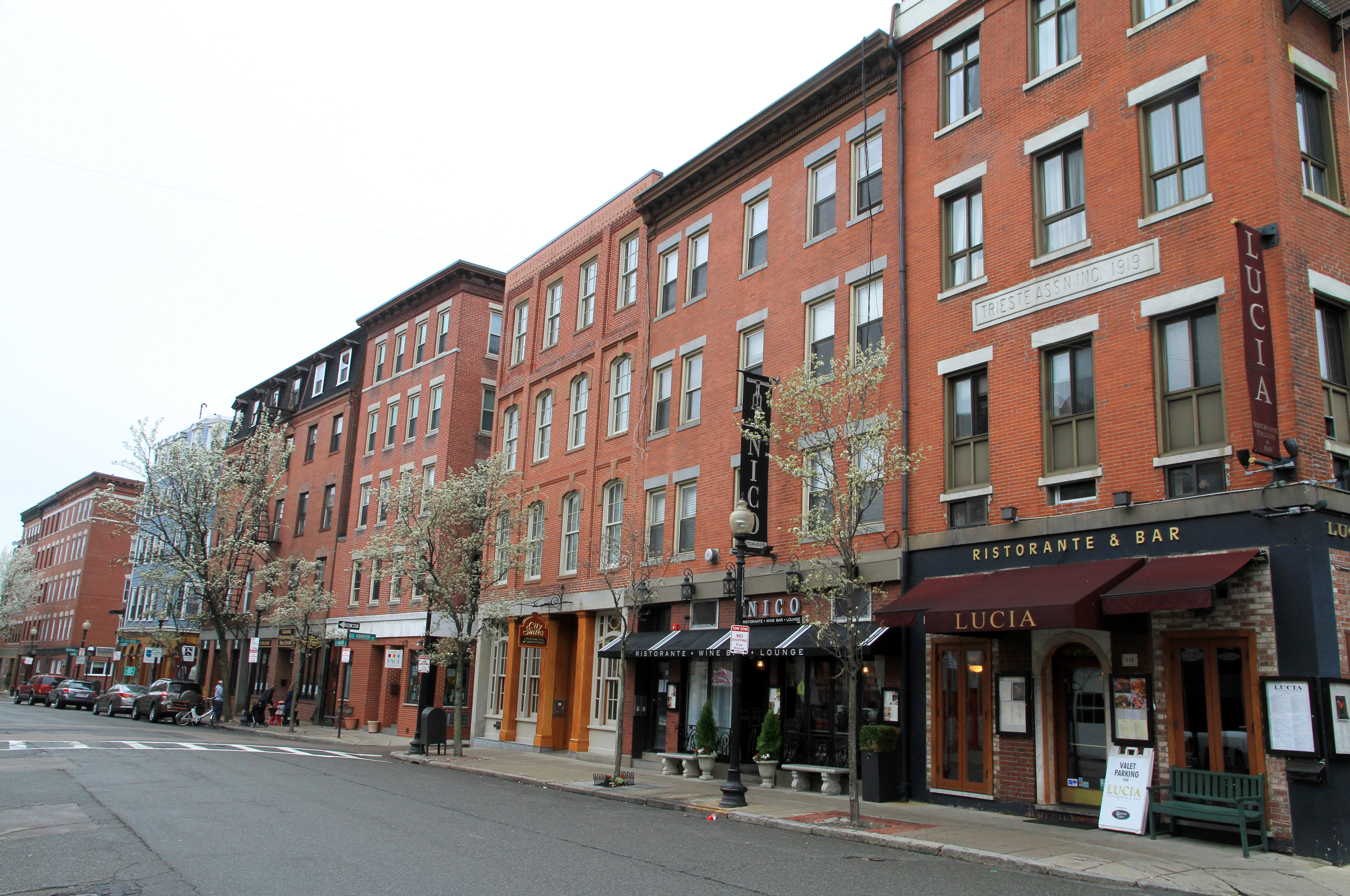
Hanover Street, 2010

=== 17th century ===
The North End as a distinct community of Boston was evident as early as 1646. Three years later, the area had a large enough population to support the North Meeting House. The construction of the building also led to the development of the North Square, which was the center of community life.

Increase Mather was the minister of the North Meeting House, an influential and powerful figure who attracted residents to the North End. On November 27, 1676, Mather's home, the meeting house, and a total of 45 buildings were destroyed by a fire—Boston organized the first paid fire department in America two years later. The meeting house was rebuilt soon afterwards, and the Paul Revere House was later constructed on the site of the Mather House. Part of Copp's Hill was converted to a cemetery, called the North Burying Ground (now known as Copp's Hill Burying Ground); the earliest grave markers in the cemetery date to 1661.

=== 18th century ===
The North End became a fashionable place to live in the 18th century. Wealthy families shared the neighborhood with artisans, journeymen, and laborers. After the Revolutionary War, some of these individuals who were also British loyalists ended up leaving the North End for England or Canada. Two brick townhouses are still standing from this period: the Pierce-Hichborn House and the Clough House on Unity Street. The Old North Church was constructed during this time as well, now known as Christ Church. It is the oldest surviving church building in Boston.

The Hutchinson Mansion in North Square was attacked by anti-Stamp Act rioters on the evening of August 26, 1765, forcing Lieutenant Governor Thomas Hutchinson to flee through his garden. In 1770, 11 year-old Christopher Seider was part of an angry crowd that attacked the home of Ebenezer Richardson which was located on Hanover Street. Richardson fired a gun into the crowd, hitting and fatally wounding the boy.

During the Siege of Boston, the North Meeting House was dismantled by the British for use as firewood.

=== 19th century ===
In the first half of the 19th century, the North End experienced a significant amount of commercial development. This activity was concentrated on Commercial, Fulton, and Lewis Streets. During this time the neighborhood also developed a red-light district, known as the Black Sea. By the late 1840s, living conditions in the crowded North End were among the worst in the city. Successive waves of immigrants came to Boston and settled in the neighborhood, beginning with the Irish and continuing with Eastern European Jews and Italians. Boston as a whole was prosperous, however, and the wealthy residents of the North End moved to newer, more fashionable neighborhoods such as Beacon Hill.

In 1849, a cholera epidemic swept through Boston, hitting the North End most harshly; most of the seven hundred victims were North Enders. In 1859, tensions between the Catholic Irish immigrants and the existing Protestant community led to the Eliot School Rebellion. By 1880, the Protestant churches had left the neighborhood.

The Boston Draft Riot of July 14, 1863, began on Prince Street in the North End.

In the latter half of the 19th century, several charitable groups were formed in the North End to provide aid to its impoverished residents. These groups included The Home for Little Wanderers and the North End Mission. The North Bennet Street Industrial School (now known as North Bennet Street School) was also founded at around this time to provide North End residents with the opportunity to gain skills that would help them find employment. Beginning in the 1880s, North End residents began to replace the dilapidated wooden housing with four- and five-story brick apartment buildings, most of which still stand today. The city contributed to the revitalization of the neighborhood by constructing the North End Park and Beach, Copp's Hill Terrace, and the North End Playground.

=== 20th century ===
In the early 20th century, the North End was dominated by Jewish and Italian immigrants. Three Italian immigrants founded the Prince Macaroni Company, one example of the successful businesses created in this community. Also during this time, the city of Boston upgraded many public facilities in the neighborhood: the Christopher Columbus School (now a condominium building), a public bathhouse, and a branch of the Boston Public Library were built. These investments, as well as the creation of the Paul Revere Mall (also known as the Prado), contributed to the North End's modernization. The Civic Service House's Night School, established in 1901, set out to do specialized settlement work along civic lines, and purposed to reach a constituency approaching or within the privileges of citizenship.

In 1918, the Spanish Influenza Pandemic hit the crowded North End severely; so many children were orphaned as a result of the pandemic that the city created the Home for Italian Children to care for them. The following year, in 1919, the Purity Distilling Company's 2.3 million gallon molasses storage tank explosively burst open, causing the Great Molasses Flood. A 25 ft wave of molasses flowed down Commercial Street towards the waterfront, sweeping away everything in its path. The wave killed 21 people, injured 150, and caused damage worth $100 million in today's money.

In 1927, the Sacco and Vanzetti wake was held in undertaker Joseph A. Langone Jr.'s Hanover Street premises. The funeral procession that conveyed Sacco and Vanzetti's bodies to the Forest Hills Cemetery began in the North End.

In 1934, the Sumner Tunnel was constructed to connect the North End to Italian East Boston, the location of the then-new Boston Airport (now Logan International Airport). In the 1950s the John F. Fitzgerald Expressway (locally known as the Central Artery) was built to relieve Boston's traffic congestion. Hundreds of North End buildings were demolished below Cross Street, and the Artery walled off the North End from downtown, isolating the neighborhood. The increased traffic led to the construction of a second tunnel between the North End and East Boston; this second tunnel (the Callahan Tunnel) opened in 1961. Although the construction of the Central Artery created years' worth of disorder, in the 1950s the North End had low disease rates, low mortality rates, and little street crime. As described by Jane Jacobs in The Death and Life of Great American Cities, in 1959 the North End's "streets were alive with children playing, people shopping, people strolling, people talking. Had it not been a cold January day, there would surely have been people sitting. The general street atmosphere of buoyancy, friendliness, and good health was so infectious that I began asking directions of people just for the fun of getting in on some talk."

Throughout the 1960s and 1970s, the North End experienced population loss. During this time, many shops in the neighborhood closed, the St. Mary's Catholic School and the St. Mary's Catholic Church closed, and the waterfront industries either relocated or went defunct. During the 1970s and 1980s, the Boston Redevelopment Authority approved high-rise, high-density housing projects in the neighborhood while North End residents worked to build affordable housing for the elderly. One of these projects, the Casa Maria Apartments, stands on the site of the St. Mary's Catholic Church.

In 1976, the neighborhood welcomed President Ford and Queen Elizabeth II, who each visited the North End as part of the United States Bicentennial Celebrations.

During the late 20th century through the early 21st century, the Central Artery was dismantled and replaced by the Big Dig project. Throughout the construction process, access to the North End was difficult for both residents and visitors; as a result, many North End businesses closed. The Rose Kennedy Greenway is now located on the former site of the Central Artery.

== Geography ==
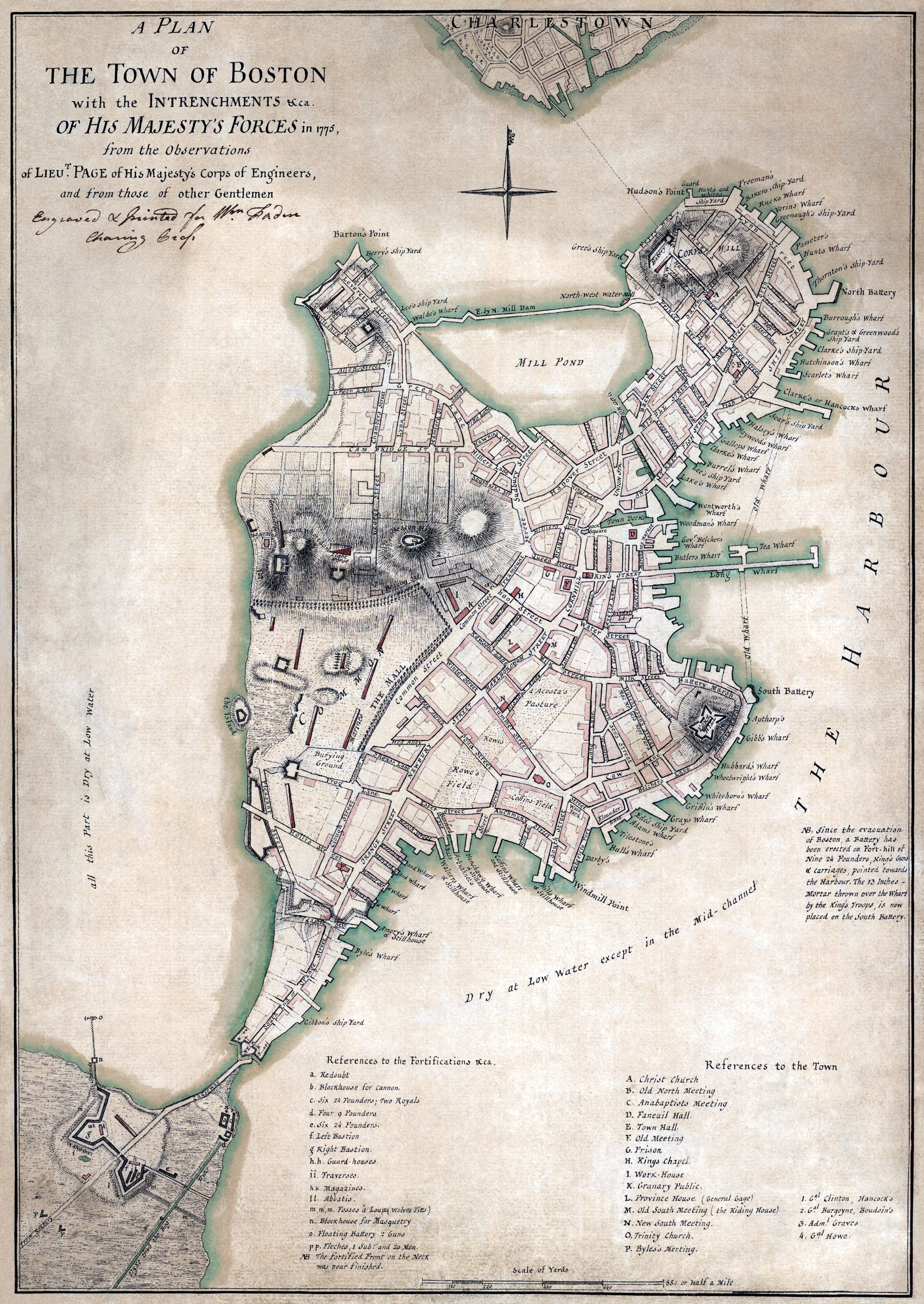
Boston in 1775. The entire city lies on the Shawmut Peninsula. The North End is the smaller promontory at the northeast corner of the peninsula, separated from the rest of the city by a large mill pond. Copp's Hill is called Corps Hill, and Hanover Street, the main thoroughfare of the community, is called Middle Street on this map.

The North End describes its location in the historic Shawmut Peninsula, which centuries of infill have obscured. Copp's Hill is the largest geographic feature and is close to the center of the neighborhood.

The North End's modern boundaries are to the northeast of the Rose Fitzgerald Kennedy Greenway, with the outlet of the Charles and Mystic Rivers to the North, and Boston Harbor to the East. Government Center, Quincy Market, and the Bulfinch Triangle neighborhoods lie across Greenway. The Bill Russell Bridge crosses the mouth of the Charles River to connect the North End to Charlestown, while the Callahan Tunnel, Sumner Tunnel, and MBTA Blue Line tunnel connect it to East Boston.

Commercial Street and Atlantic Avenue border the neighborhood on the harbor side, while Hanover Street bisects the neighborhood and is the main north–south street. Cross Street and North Washington Street runs along the community's western edge. The North End Parks of the Greenway occupy the site of the former elevated Central Artery (demolished in 2003). Other notable green spaces include Cutillo Park, Polcari Park, Langone Park, DeFilippo Playground, the Paul Revere Mall (The Prado), and the Christopher Columbus Waterfront Park.

No MBTA subway station is within the neighborhood, but stations serving the Blue, Orange, and Green Lines are within five- to ten-minute walks, including Aquarium, Haymarket, and North Station.

== Demographics ==
According to the 2010 Census data, the neighborhood's population is 10,131, a 5.13% rise from 2000. The majority of the North End's residents are White (90.88%), followed by Hispanic or Latino (3.69%), Asian (2.83%), Black/African Americans (1.13%), two or more races/ethnicities (1.01%) other race/ethnicity (0.29%), American Indian and Alaska Native (0.15%), and Native Hawaiian and Other Pacific Islander (0.03%).

=== African American community ===
A small community of free African Americans lived at the base of Copp's Hill from the 17th to the 19th century. Members of this community were buried in the Copp's Hill Burying Ground, where a few remaining headstones can still be seen today. The community was served by the First Baptist Church.

By the late 19th century, the African American community of the North End was known as New Guinea. By that time, however, much of the community had actually moved to Beacon Hill.

=== Irish community ===
Between 1845 and 1853, a massive wave of Irish immigrants settled in the North End; the neighborhood became predominantly Irish (the city's overall population was also affected, going from a predominantly Yankee-Protestant city to being one-third Irish in just a few years). Between 1865 and 1880, the North End was almost exclusively Irish (or Irish-American) and Catholic.

=== Jewish community ===
In the late 19th century, a stable Jewish community began to develop in the North End. Much of the community settled along Salem Street. The community founded places of worship, a Hebrew School, and social programs. In 1903, the first and only new synagogue to be built in the North End was constructed. Carroll Place was renamed "Jerusalem Place" in honor of the new building. By 1922, however, the majority of Jewish residents had moved out of the North End, preferring other neighborhoods such as Roxbury.

=== Italian community ===
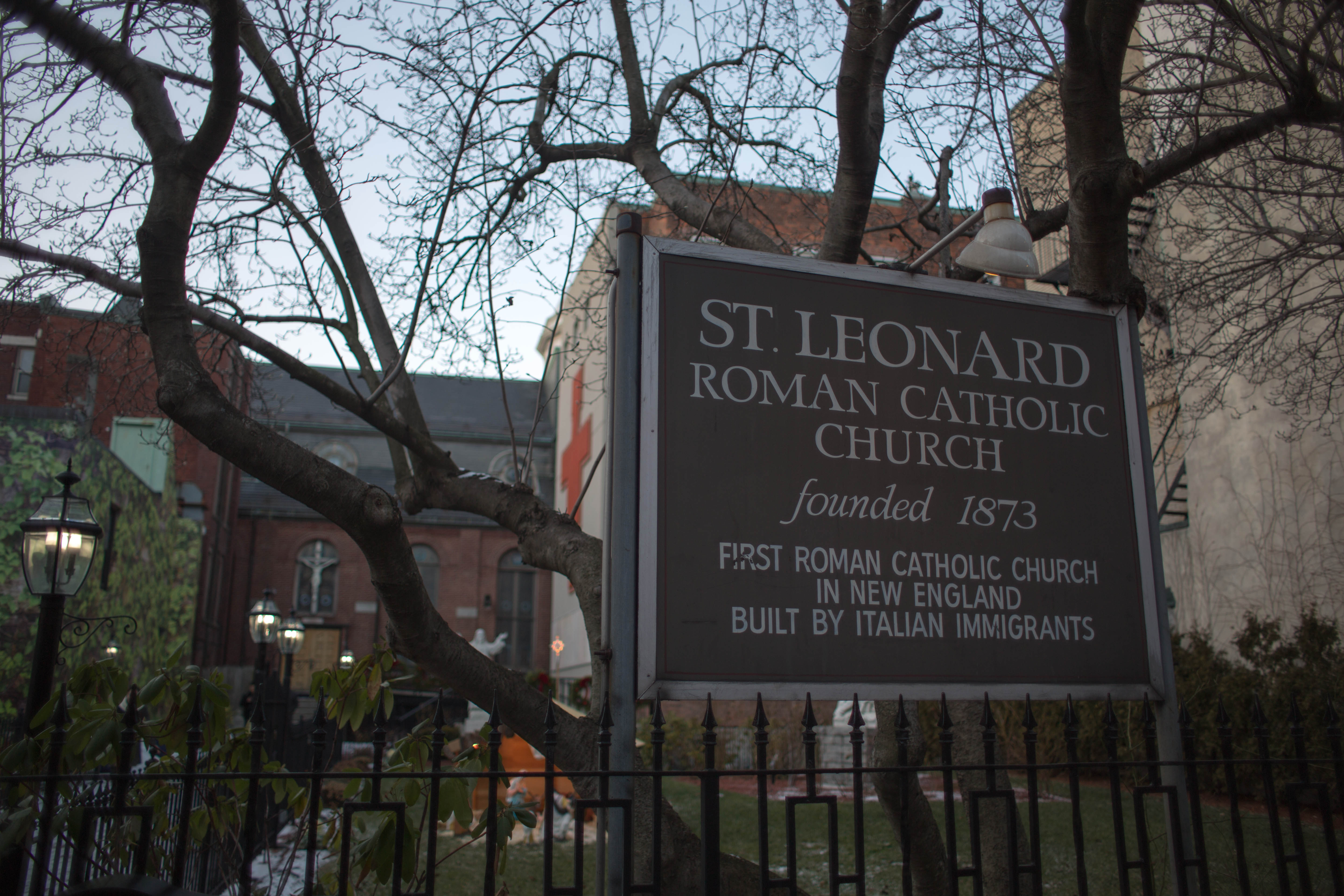
St. Leonard Roman Catholic Church, Boston, Mass

By 1890, the North Square area was known as Little Italy. By 1910, Italian immigrants alone constituted a quarter of all residents in the North End, chiefly in the 6th ward with over 17,000 immigrants. The population of Italians in the North End grew steadily until reaching its peak, in 1930, of 44,000 (99.9% of the neighborhood's total population). Although many businesses, social clubs, and religious institutions celebrate the neighborhood's Italian heritage, the North End is now increasingly diverse. Both the population of the North End and the percent of that population who are Italian have decreased over the years; as of 2014 the population of the North End was 7,360, of whom 824 (11%) had been born in Italy and an additional 2,772 (38%) were of Italian heritage.

In 1923, the Michael Angelo (later renamed "Michelangelo") School was built in the North End and named in honor of the Italian residents. The street on which the building was constructed was renamed Michelangelo Street, and remains the only street in the North End with an Italian name. The Michelangelo School closed in 1989, and the building was converted into housing.

Italian bakeries, restaurants, small shops, and groceries opened in the first half of the 20th century. The first immigrants found work selling fruit, vegetables, wine, cheese and olive oil. Later immigrants found more opportunities in the construction trades, and by 1920 the neighborhood was served by Italian physicians, dentists, funeral homes, and barbers. Residents founded businesses, some of which still exist today, including Prince Pasta, the Pastene Corporation, and Pizzeria Regina.

The Italian American community faced anti-Italian sentiment, prejudice, and neglect. After World War II, however, Italian Americans began to gain political power which then helped the community to address these issues. Today, the "old world" Italian atmosphere of the North End helps to drive tourism, and many of the small neighborhood shops have been replaced by restaurants. Italian feasts, such as the Feast of St. Anthony and the Fisherman's Feast, are still celebrated in the streets of the North End, and draw large crowds.

== Arts and culture ==
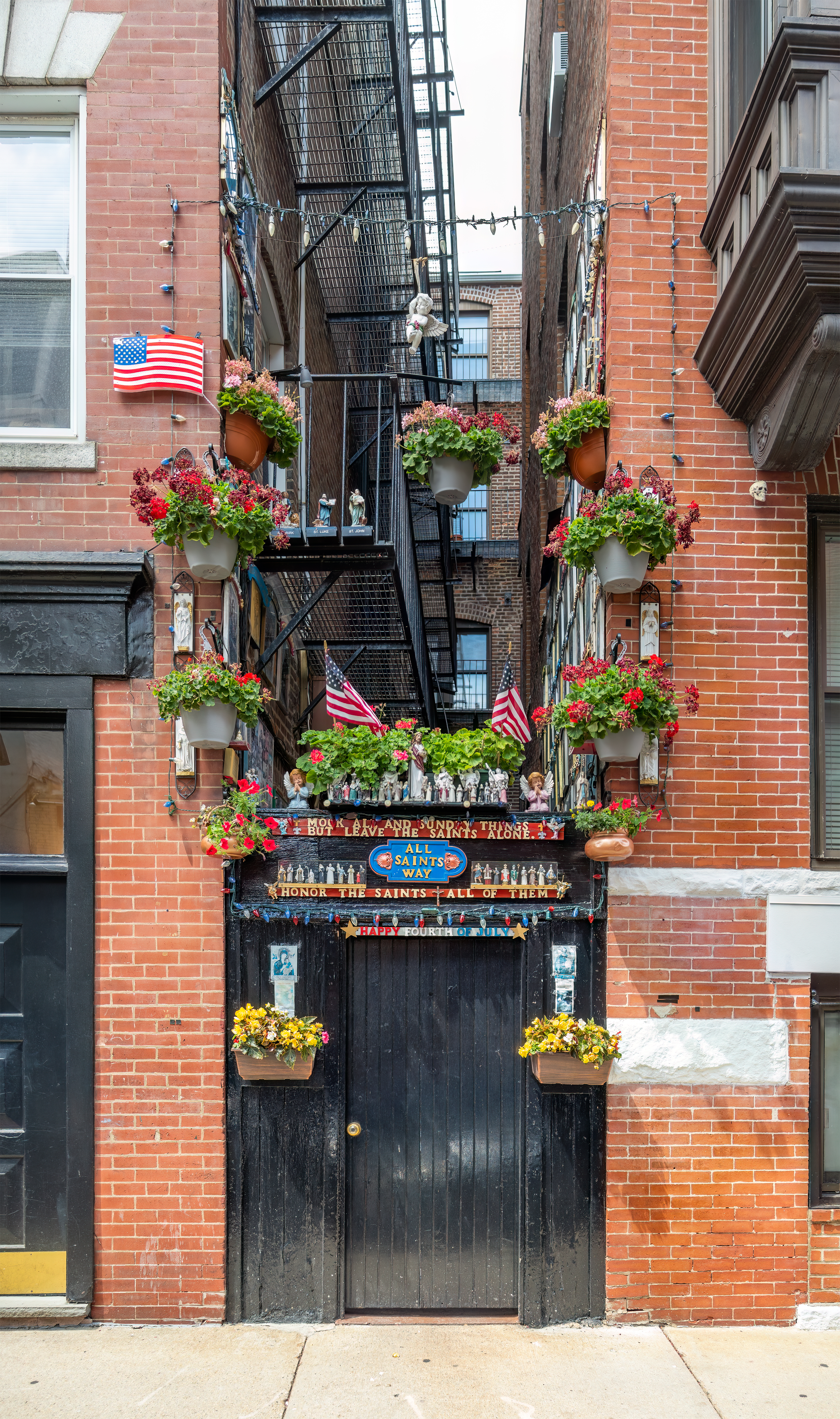
All Saints Way

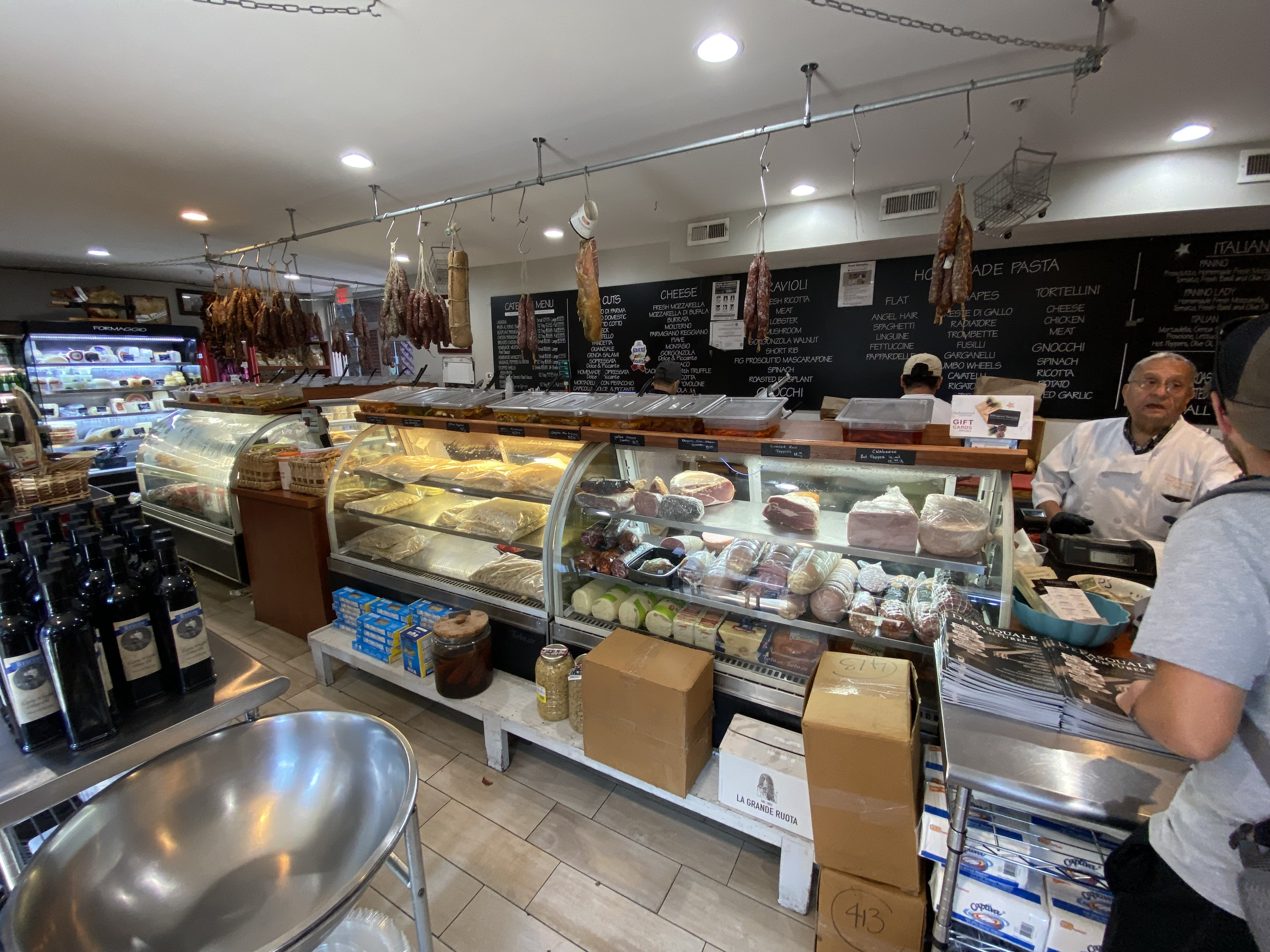
Bricco Salumeria shop in the North End

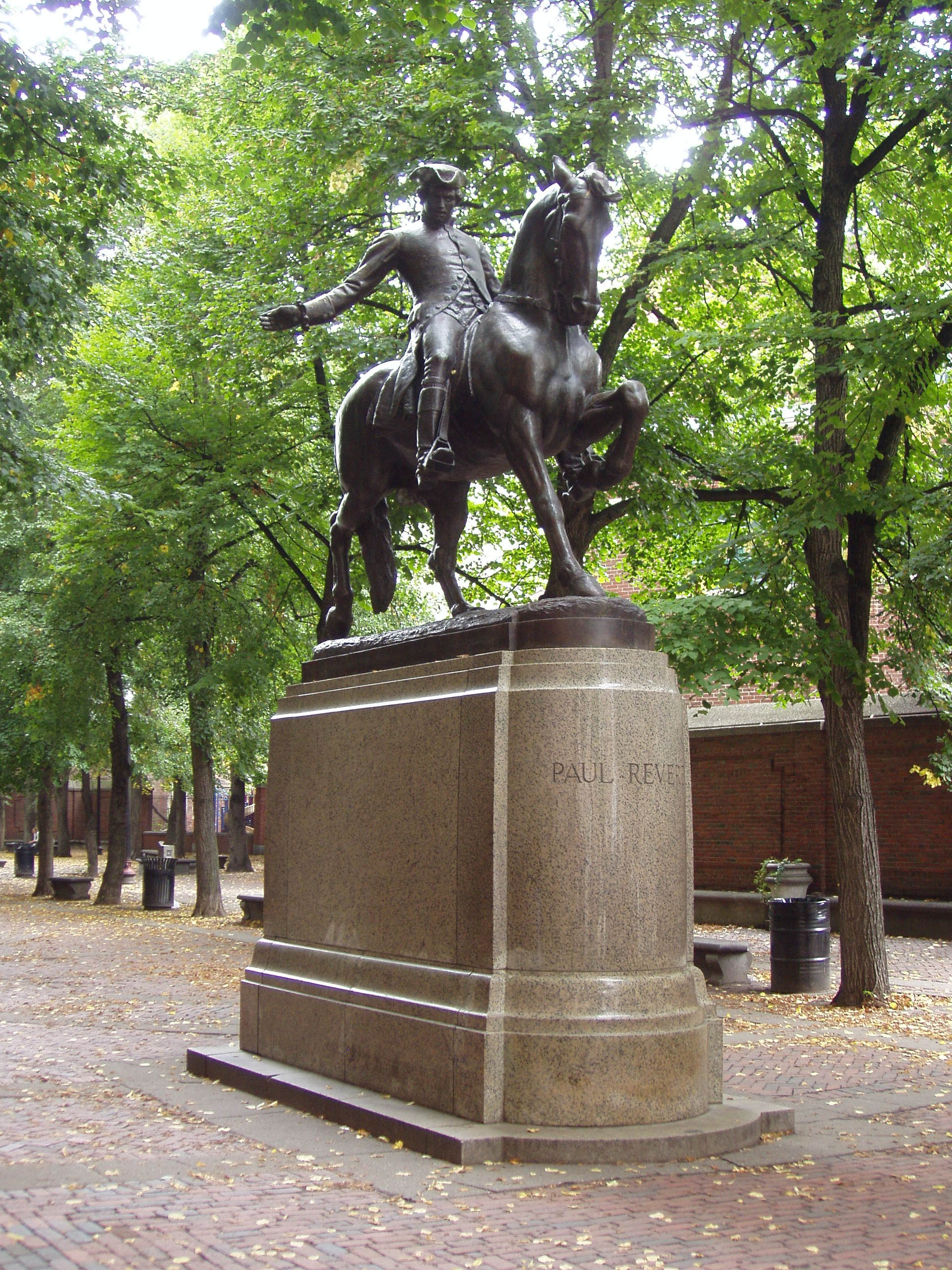
Paul Revere Statue by Cyrus Edwin Dallin

=== Arts ===
The North End Music and Performing Arts Center (NEMPAC) and the Improv Asylum Theater are located on Hanover Street. All Saints Way, a private art project located on Battery Street, is occasionally open to the public. It consists of framed portraits of Roman Catholic saints hung on a brick wall, some of which are visible from the street.

=== Cuisine ===
At the end of the 19th century the North End was filled with small restaurants that served inexpensive meals. In 1909, there were 12 active Italian restaurants, and by the 1930s a few of these restaurants were renowned. Today, the North End's streets are lined with cafes, small grocery stores, and Italian restaurants. These restaurants are a popular destination for both locals and tourists.

Sicilian immigrants also started food companies specializing in their native cuisine, which after successful expansion moved out of the neighborhood. The Pastene company began as a family pushcart in the North End in 1848. Beginning in 1912, Prince pasta was manufactured in the North End and sold at 92 Prince Street. (The brand is now owned by New World Pasta.)

=== Private education ===
St. Johns School is a private Roman Catholic school that is located in North Square. It opened in 1873 and has served the neighborhood continuously since then.

The North End is also home to the North Bennet Street School, a trade and craftmanship school that was founded in 1885.

=== Public art ===
The North End is home to six of Boston's publicly accessible artworks. The Boston Art Commission has care and custody of all public art located on city property.

- North End Library Mosaics (2009) - located at 25 Parmenter Street.
- Paul Revere sculpture (1940) - located at the Paul Revere Mall, between Hanover Street and Salem Street.
- Merchant Marine Memorial - located near the Andrew P. Puopolo Junior Athletic Field, on Commercial Street.
- Benjamin Franklin Tablet (1946) - located on the corner of Union Street and Hanover Street.
- Christopher Columbus sculpture (1979) - located in the Christopher Columbus Waterfront Park, near Atlantic Avenue.
- Massachusetts Beirut Memorial (1992) - located in the Christopher Columbus Waterfront Park.

=== Summer festivals ===
Every summer, the remaining Italian residents of the North End hold festivals (feasts) to honor the patron saints of different regions in Italy from where their families immigrated. Statues of these saints are paraded down the streets of the neighborhood while well-wishers attach dollar bills to the statues as a donation and show of support. The feasts also include marching bands, food and other vendors, and live music.

=== Architecture ===
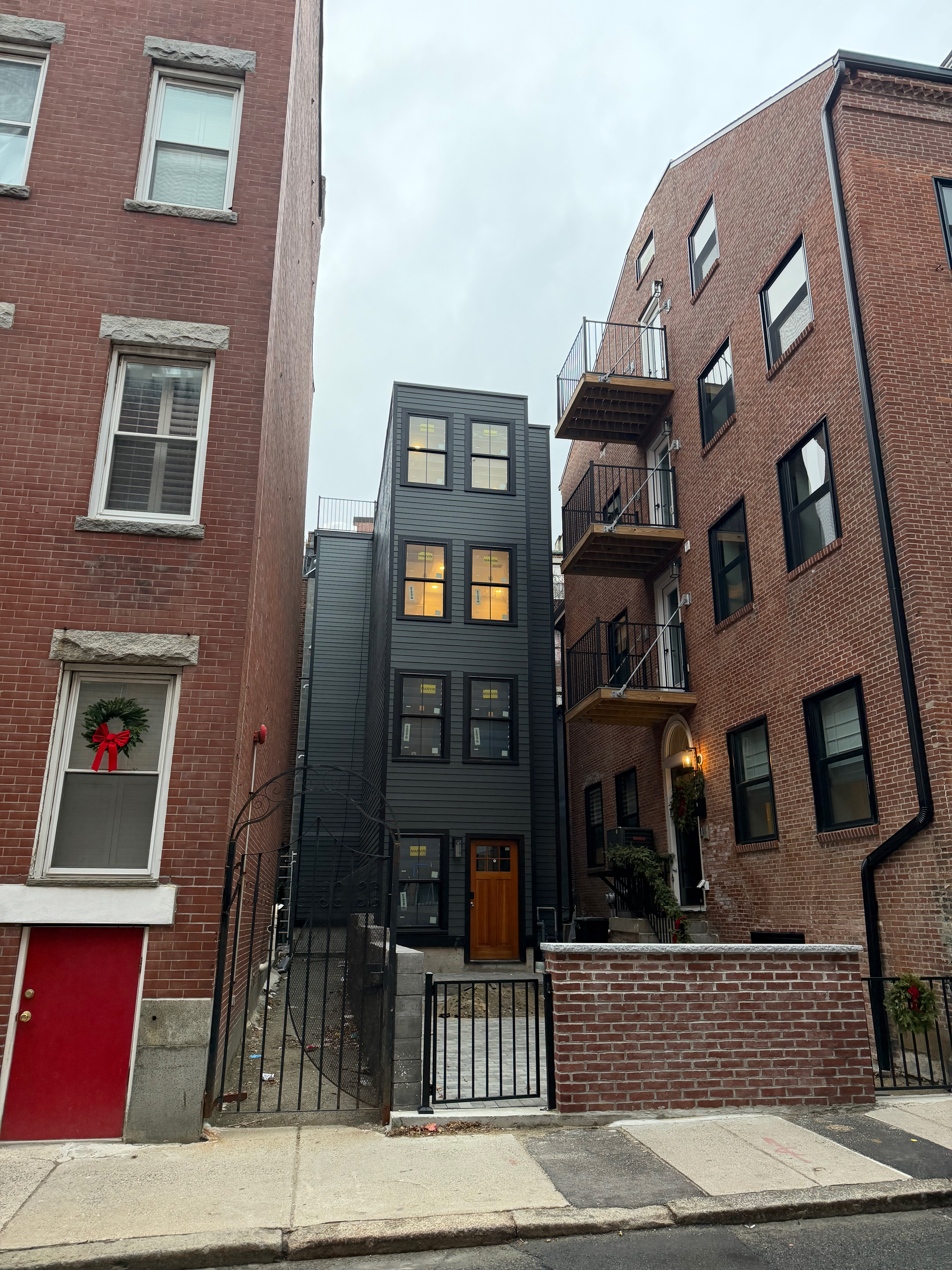
Old vs. new architecture on Salem Street

The North End has a mixture of architecture from all periods of American history, including early structures such as the Old North Church (1723), the Paul Revere House (1680), the Pierce-Hichborn House (1711), and the Clough House (1712). However, the bulk of the architecture seen in the area today dates from the late 19th to early 20th centuries, when tenement architecture replaced mansions and other buildings to accommodate the influx of immigrants. By the time of the Great Depression, the North End's reputation as a city slum resulted in lending discrimination; the area's residents could not obtain mortgages for construction or rehabilitation. Instead, residents, many of whom were carpenters, electricians, plumbers, and masons, lent their labor to each other and succeeded at rehabilitating the North End's buildings at low cost.

Starting in the mid-1970s, the abandoned industrial area along the North End's waterfront was rebuilt and converted into a luxury housing and business district. After the 1970s and continuing to present day, developers converted tenements into larger apartments and condominiums. New development is regulated in this historic district under city zoning regulations.

=== Historic sites ===
North End has twelve sites on the National Register of Historic Places.

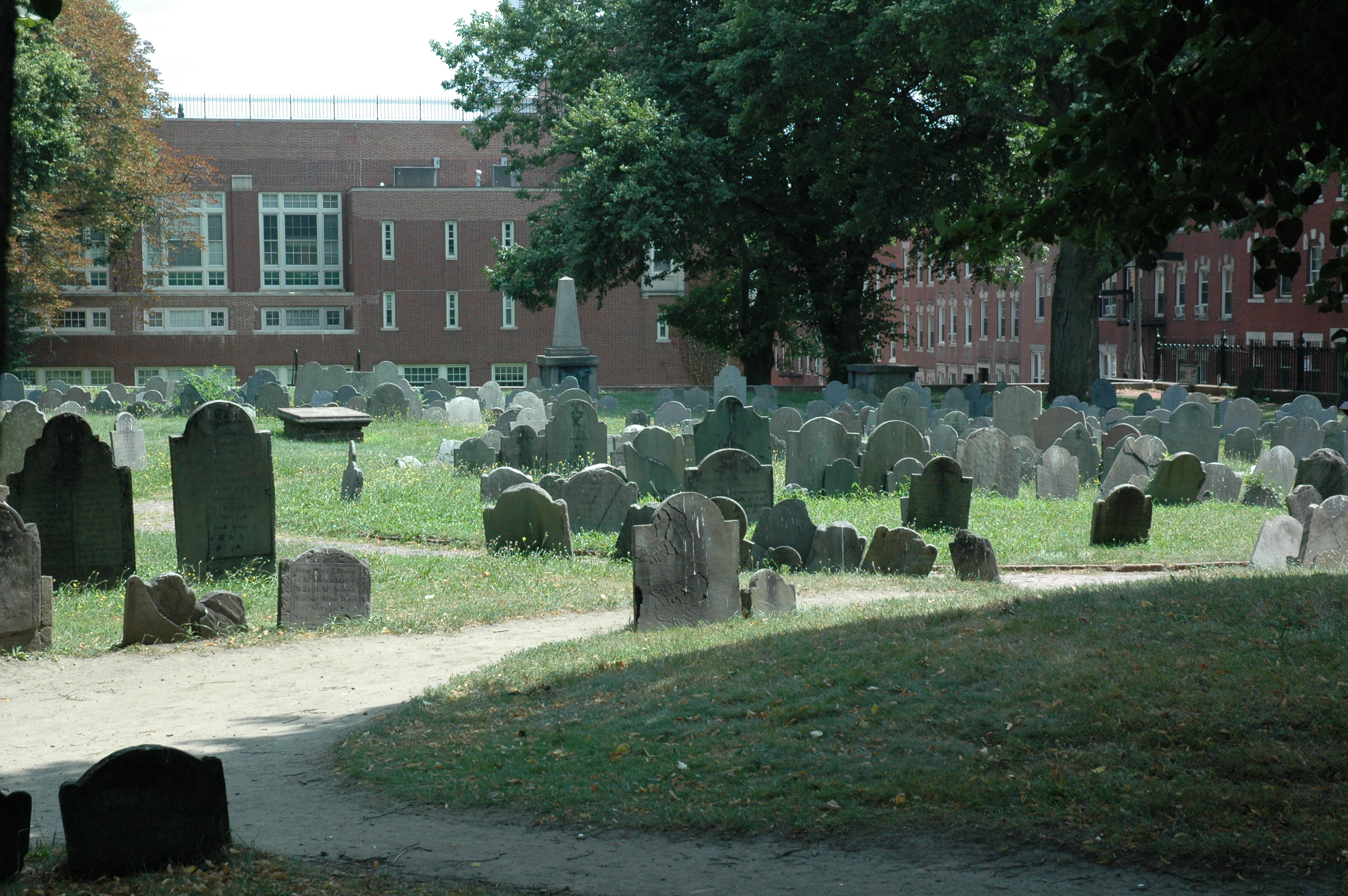
Copp's Hill Burying Ground

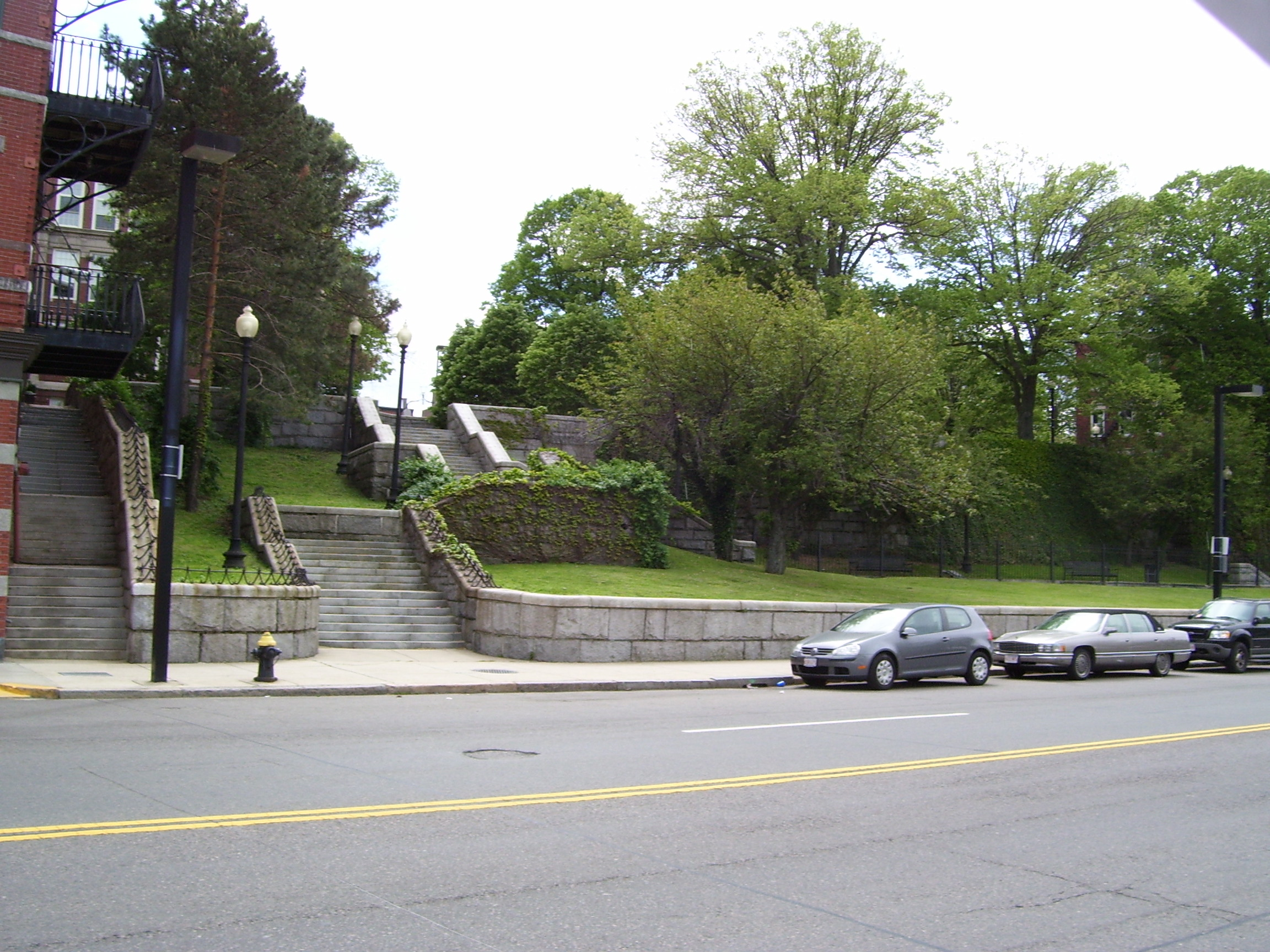
Copp's Hill Terrace

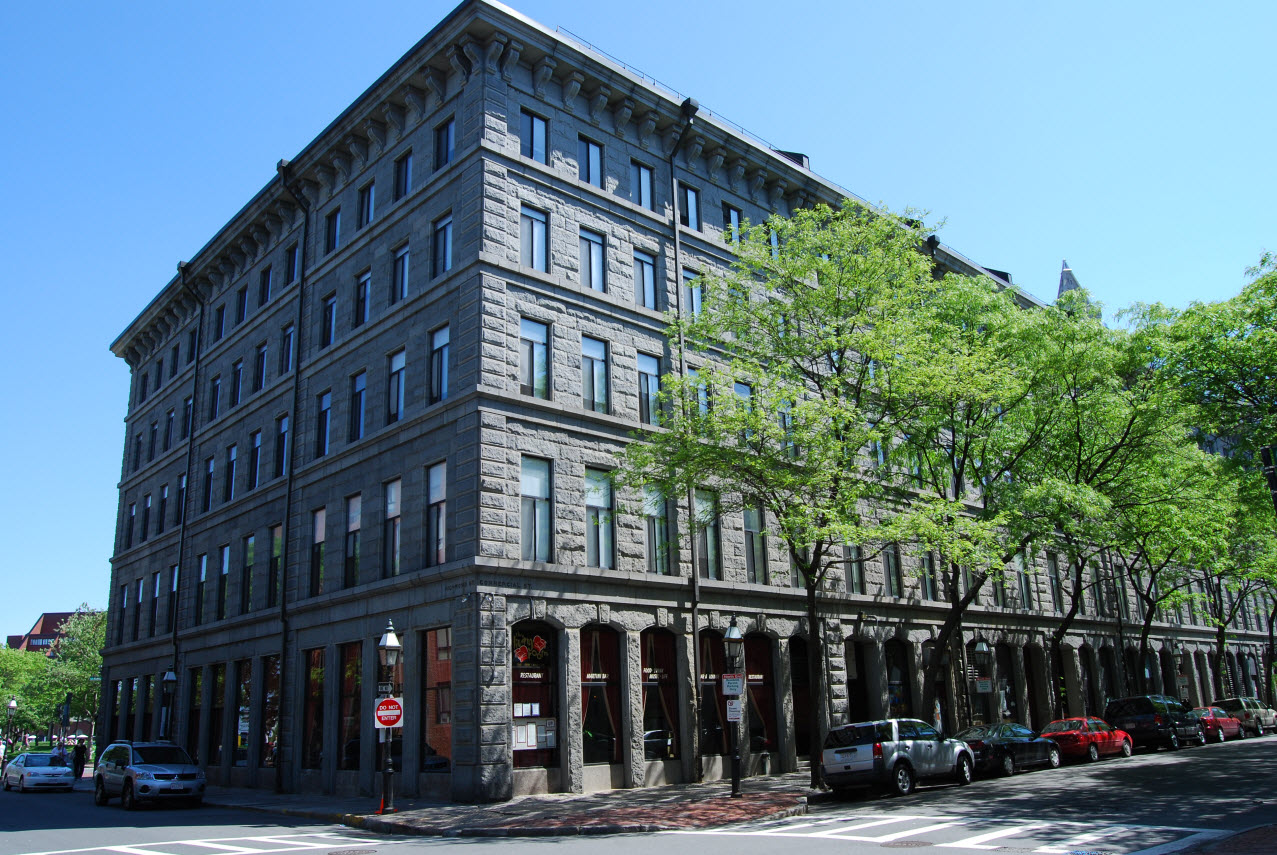
Fulton-Commercial Streets District

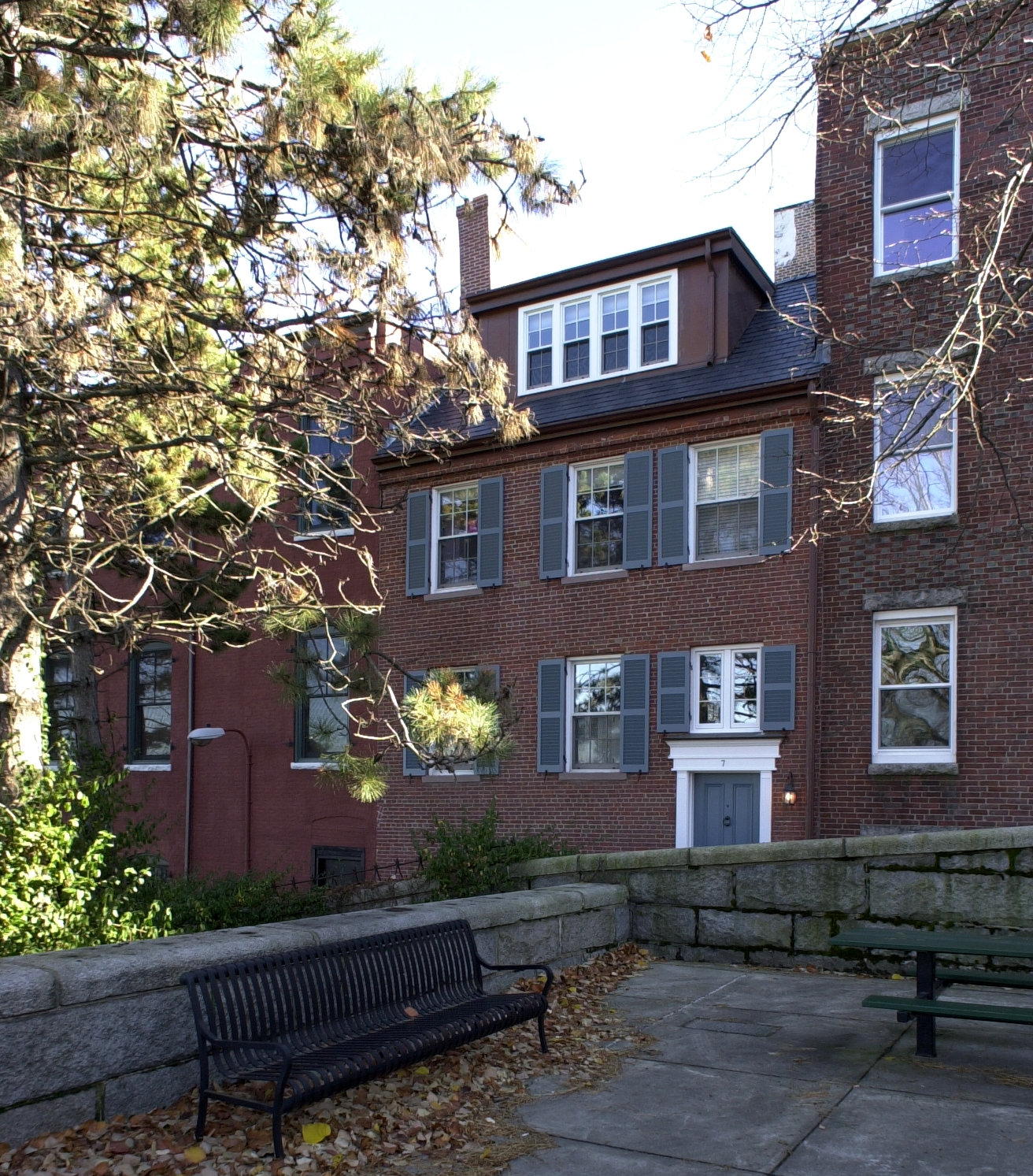
Ozias Goodwin House

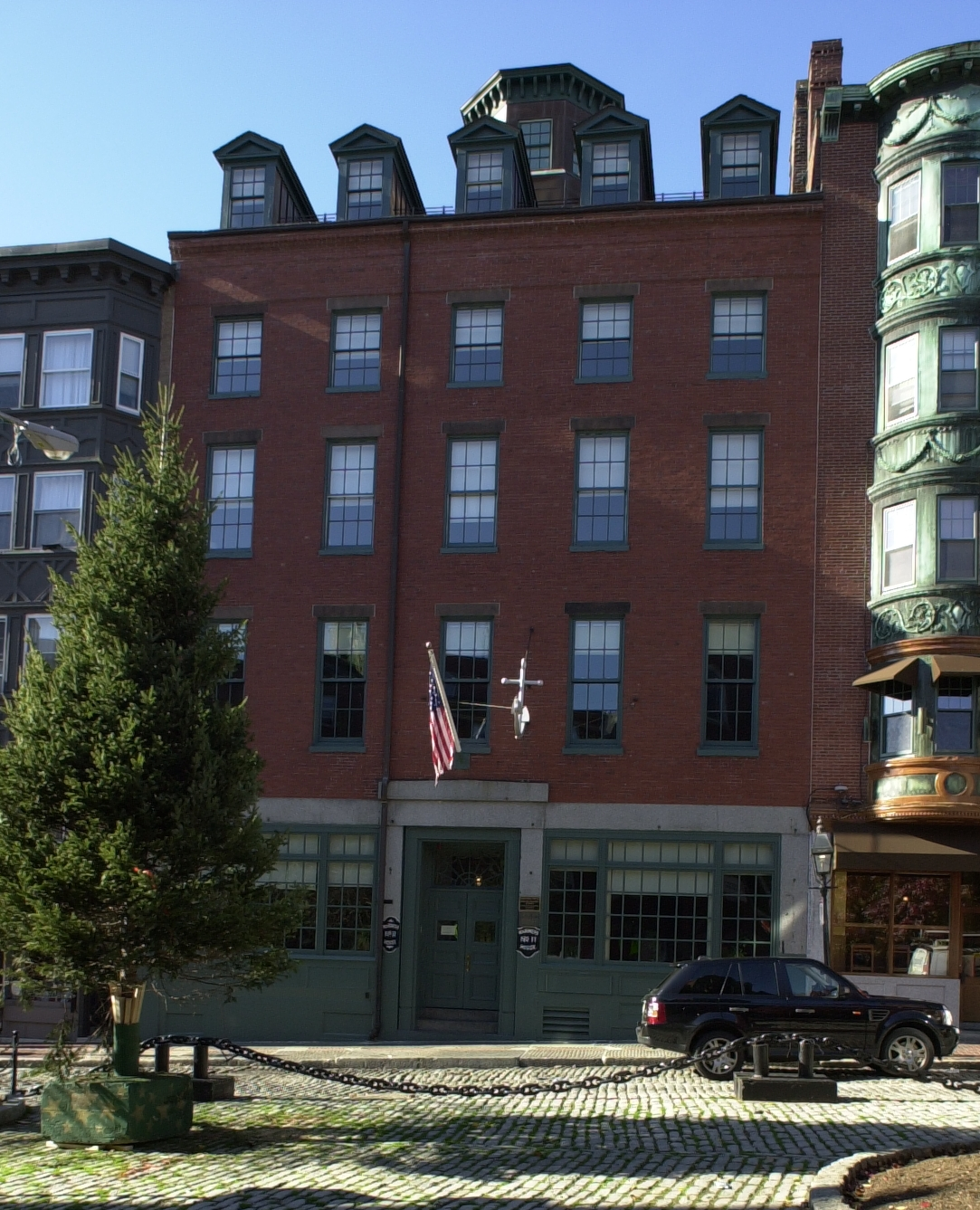
Mariners House

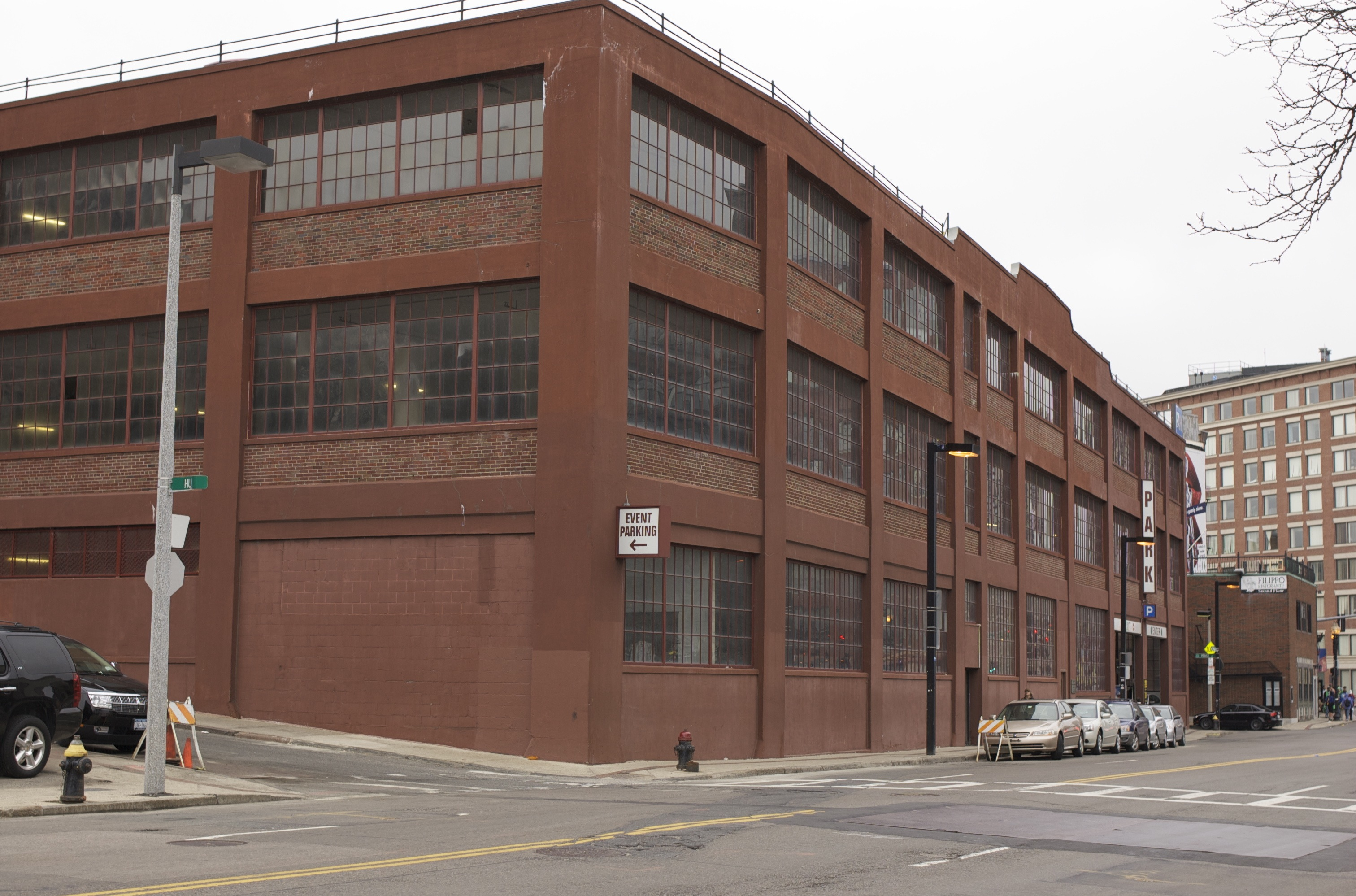
North Terminal Garage

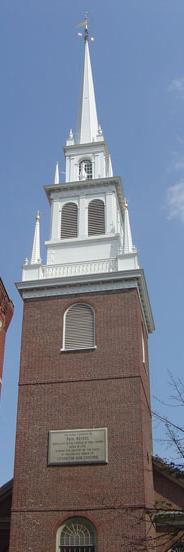
Old North Church

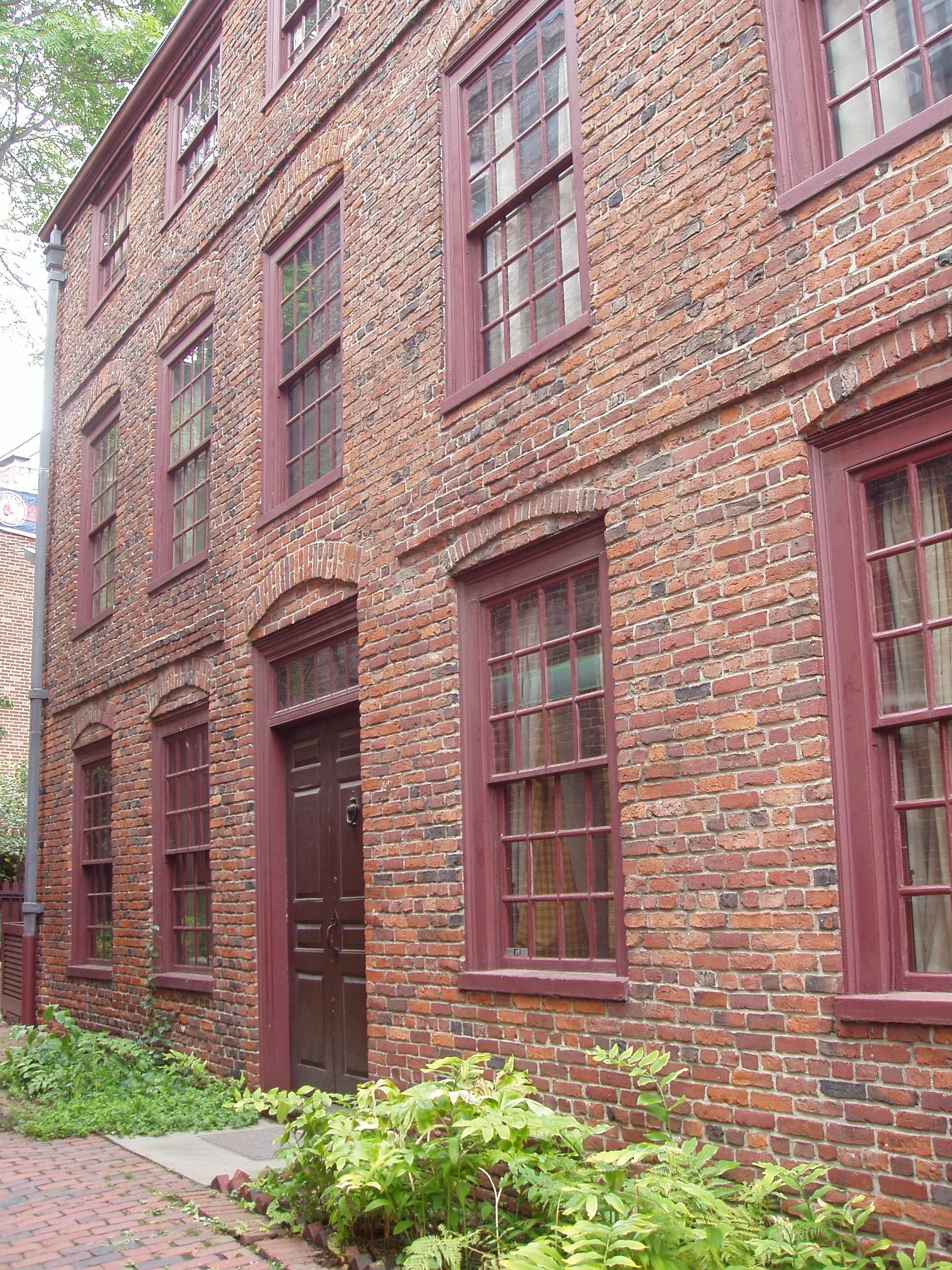
Pierce-Hichborn House

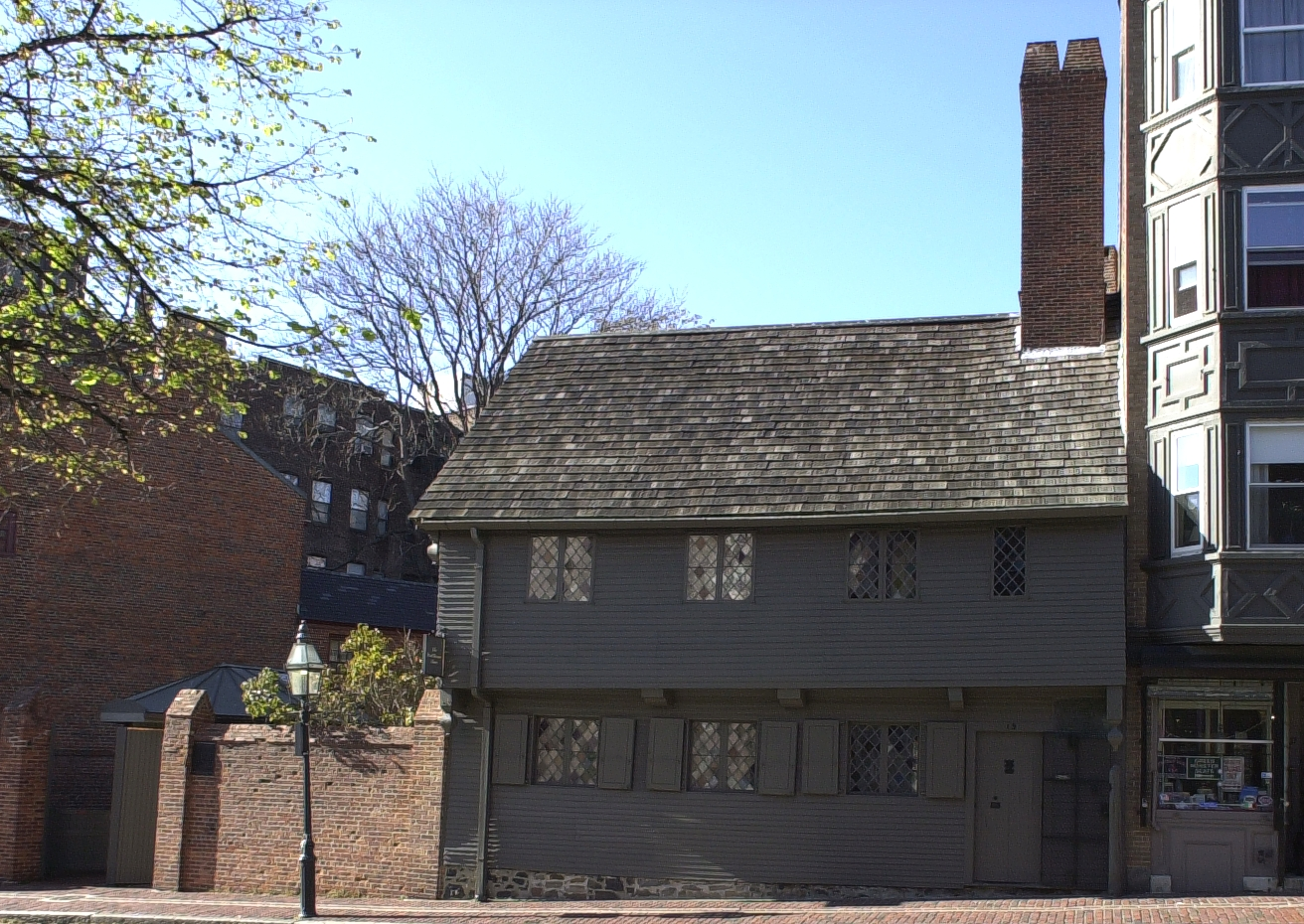
Paul Revere House

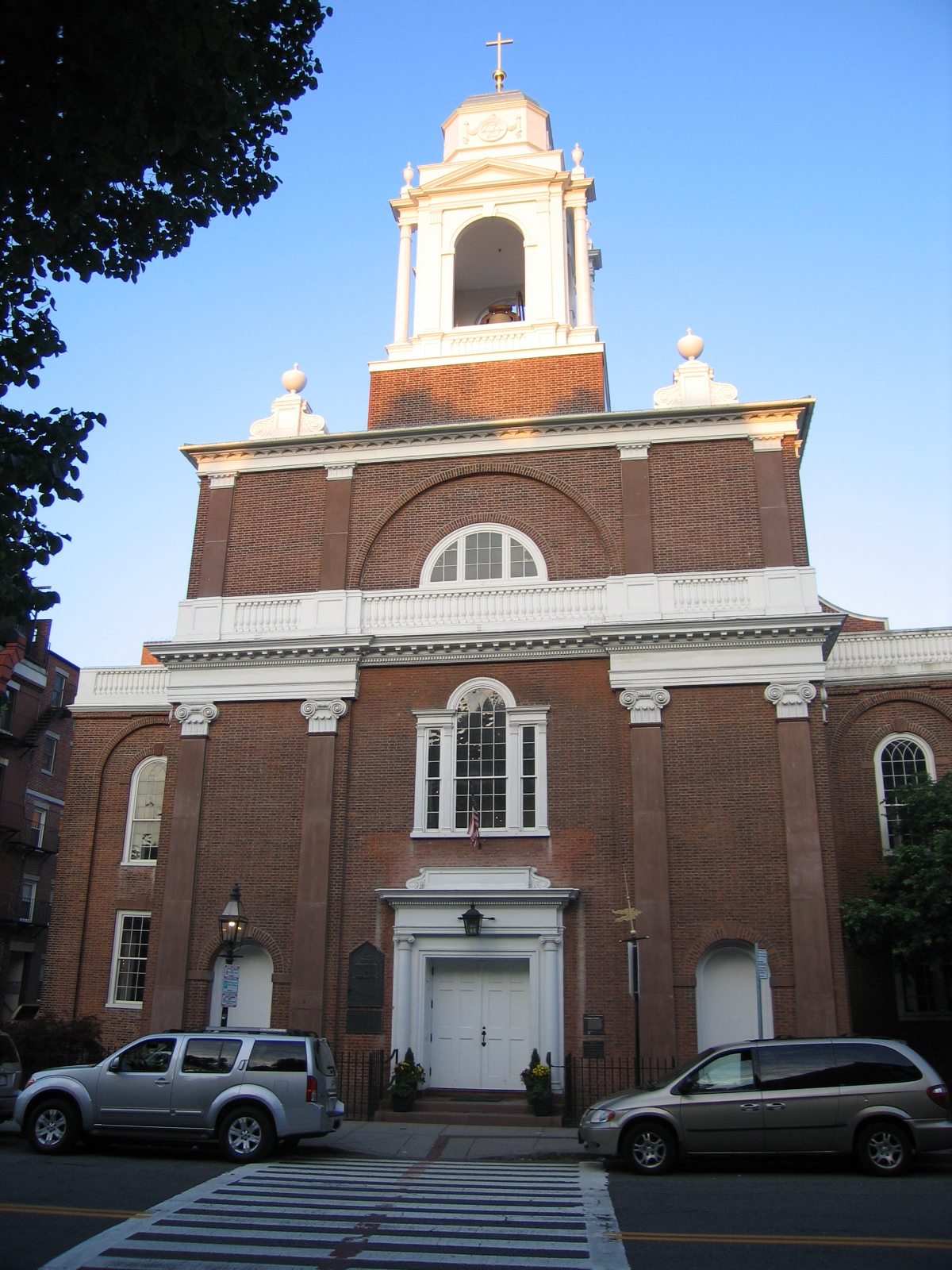
St. Stephen's Church

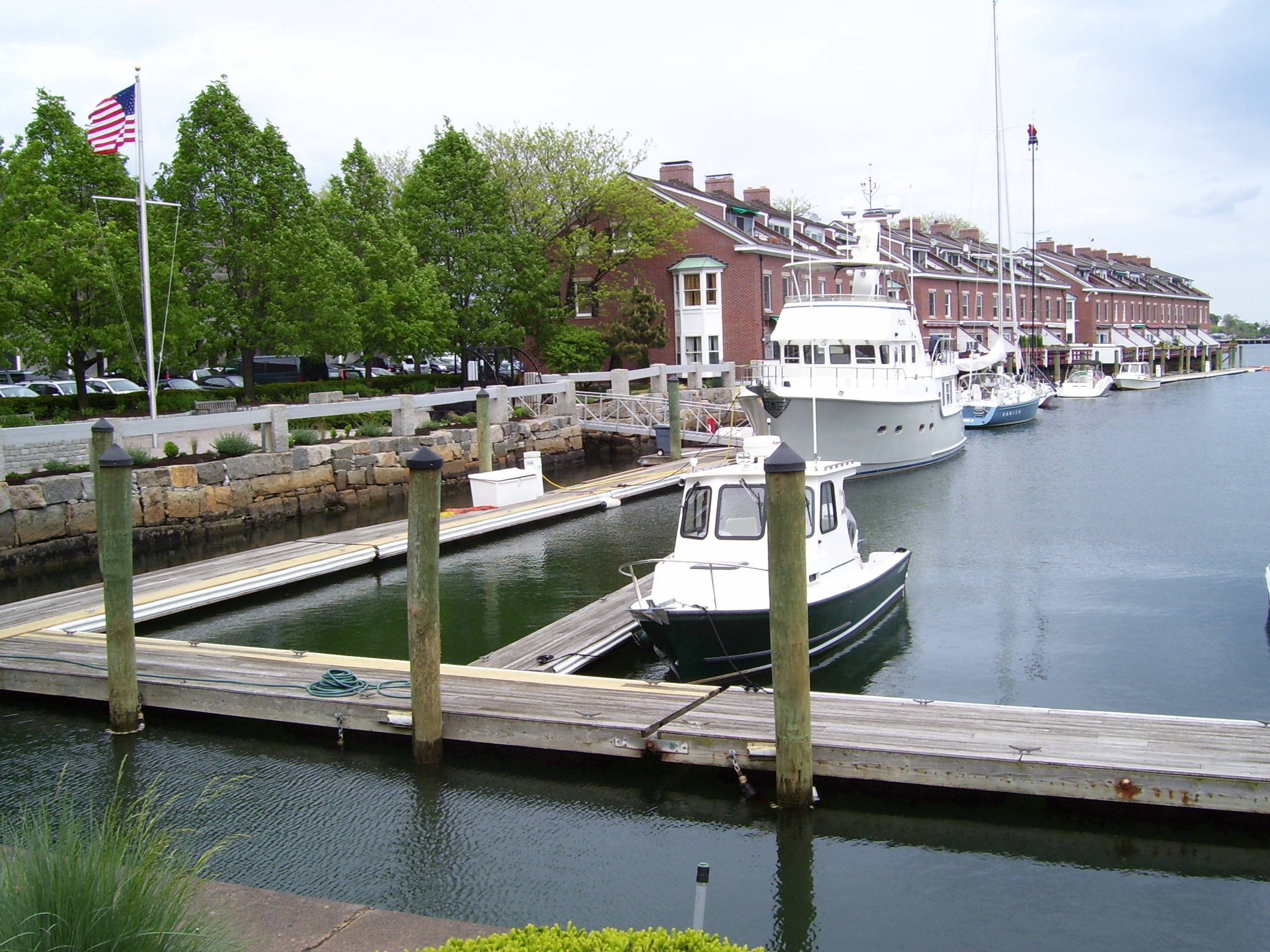
Union Wharf

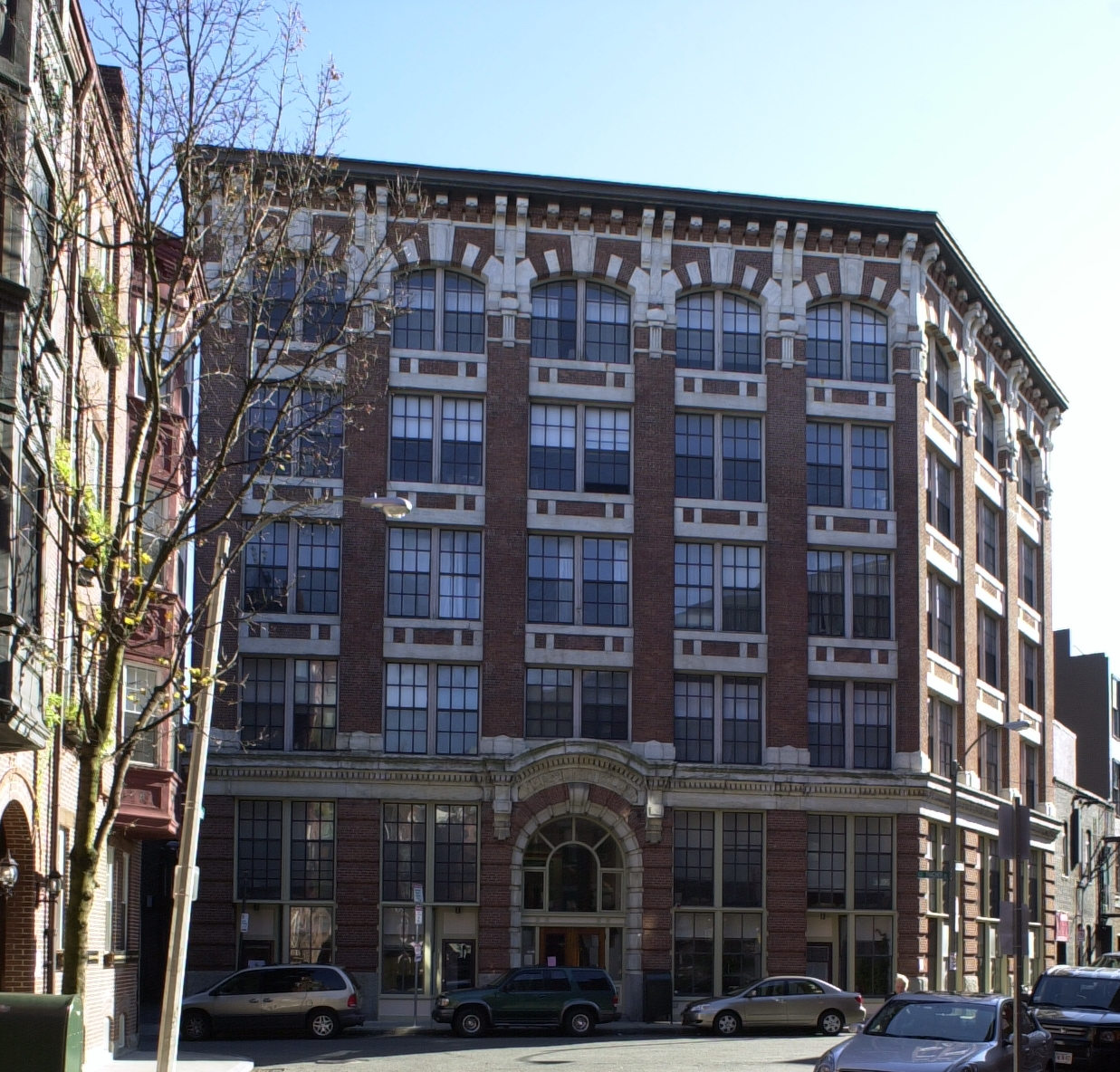
Vermont Building

Other notable sites include:

- Copp's Hill
- Equestrian statue of Paul Revere
- Freedom Trail
- Hanover Street
- Langone Park
- North End Parks
- North Street
- North Square
- Skinny House

== Government services ==
=== Police ===
The North End is located within the Boston Police Department's A-1 district (Downtown, Beacon Hill, and Chinatown are also included in this district).

Residents complain of repeated noise and litter problems stemming from loud partying in the neighborhood. In 2012, Boston police officers increased patrols in the North End to deal with noise complaints. Other areas of concern have included attacks on women and a series of breaking and enterings to residential apartments. Members of the Patriarca crime family have historically lived in or operated out of the North End, including Gennaro Angiulo, Gaspare Messina, and the Dinunzio brothers (Anthony & Carmen).

=== Fire ===
The North End is served by the Boston Fire Department. The area has been impacted by a number of significant fires—the Boston Fire Historical Society notes the following five-alarm fires in the North End since 1860:

- December 10, 1905 – Consolidated Gas Company coal sheds on Commercial Street opposite Charter Street
- February 20, 1913 – Braman, Dow & Company at 239 Causeway Street
- November 2, 1952 – Union Wharf off Commercial Street
- March 7, 1962 – Commercial Wharf
- July 20, 1978 – Apartment building at 179–181 Salem Street
- February 22, 2007 – Five-story commercial and residential building at 129 Endicott Street

Two fires are known to have resulted in at least 10 fatalities, both involving crowded housing conditions:

- February 2, 1890 – tenement at 259 North Street (12 deaths)
- January 29, 1902 – lodging house at 12 Fleet Street (10 deaths)

=== Public education ===
The Boston Public School system operates the John Eliot Elementary School in the North End. The school opened as the North Writing School in 1713 and merged with the North Latin School in 1790 to form the John Eliot School; it is Boston's oldest continuously run school. In 2007, the Eliot school was considered for closure due to poor performance. Between 2007 and 2011, school administrators instituted a successful improvement program, and, by 2012 the Eliot school was classified as an innovation school which was recognized for excellence by Governor Deval Patrick.

=== Public library ===
The Boston Public Library operates the North End Branch Library, located at 25 Parmenter Street. The branch was established in 1913 and moved to its present location, a building designed by Carl Koch, in 1963. This branch maintains an Italian-language collection as well as a local history collection in addition to its regular holdings.

=== Public transportation ===
The North End is accessible via mass transit provided by the Massachusetts Bay Transportation Authority (MBTA) including:

- MBTA subway: Orange Line and Green Line at Haymarket and North Station, and the Blue Line at Aquarium station
- MBTA Commuter Rail: four lines at North Station
- MBTA bus: the 4, 92, 93, 111, 191, 192, 193, 325, 326, 352, 354, 424, 426, 426/455, and 428 bus lines. The number 4 bus uses Commercial Street for part of its route that connects North Station with South Station
- MBTA ferry: ferries depart from Long Wharf and Central Wharf

== Infrastructure ==
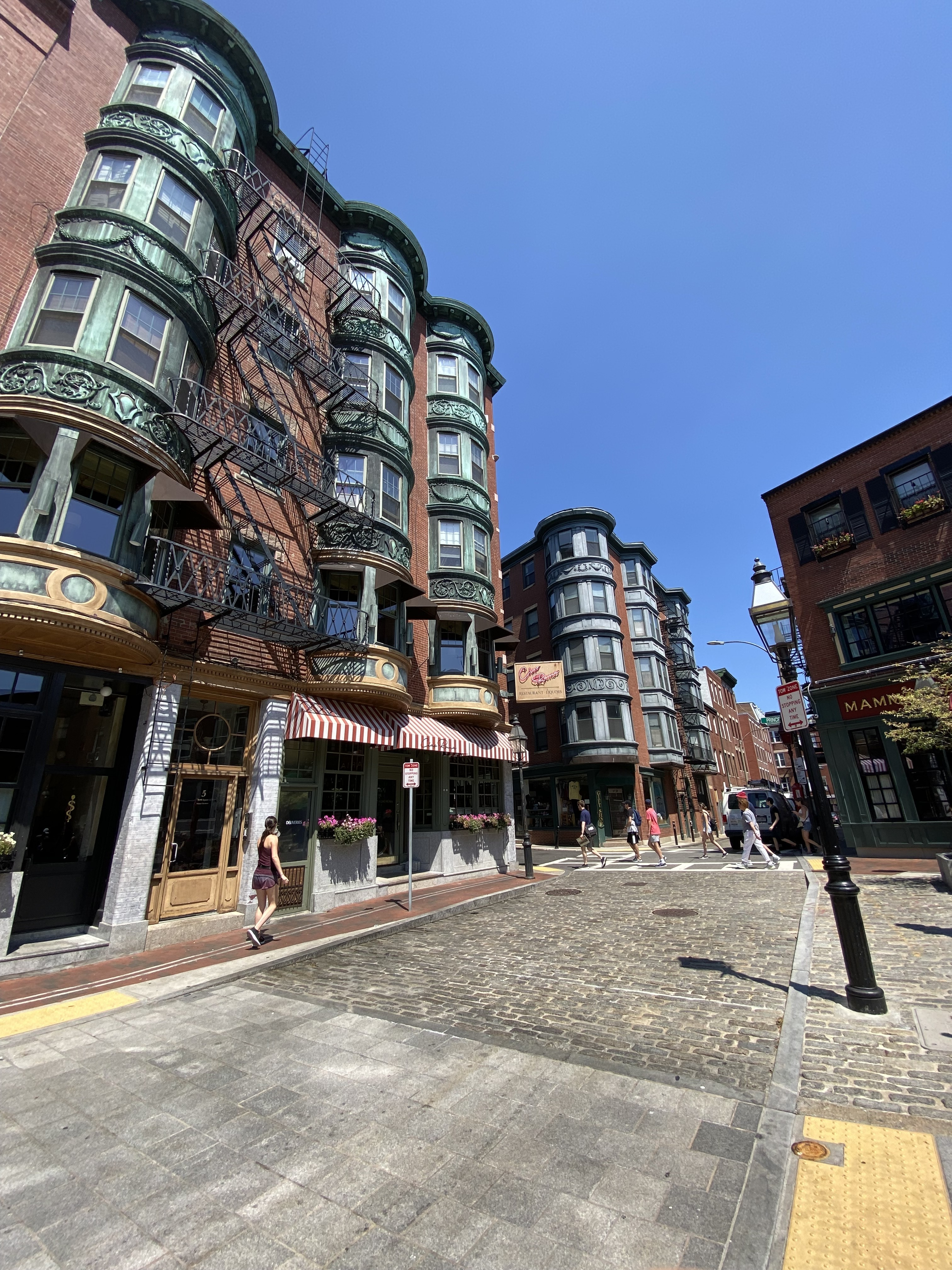
View of buildings on Garden Court Street

The North End has narrow, dense streets. No major streets run through the neighborhood, and virtually all trips made within the neighborhood are by walking. Still, many sidewalks are not ADA accessible because they are narrow or obstructed. Resolving this accessibility issue would require removing some on-street parking spaces.

Free and unlimited resident parking passes mean that 4,000 permits are available for only 1,500 on-street resident parking spaces. The few visitor parking spaces do not have meters, but do have two-hour limits. Paid public parking is available within the neighborhood at Lewis Wharf, Sargents Wharf, and the Cooper Street lot. Nearby public parking garages include Government Center, Dock Square, and the Boston Harbor Garage. At night, many restaurants offer valet parking.

Busy roads ring the North End. Commercial Street has two lanes of northbound and one lane of southbound traffic; and goes around the North End's eastern perimeter. Private shuttles linking North Station to the Seaport neighborhood also use this road. On the Western edge is North Washington Street, which has the highest traffic volume in the immediate area.

Seasonal private ferries serving the Boston Harbor Islands operate from Long Wharf. Boston Water Taxis provides seasonal, on-demand water taxi service from five North End docks: Long Wharf, Yacht Haven Marina, Sargents Wharf, Burroughs Wharf, and Battery Wharf.

In 2017, the City unveiled a two-way protected cycle track on the east side of Commercial Street. Three BLUEBikes (formerly Hubway) bikeshare stations are on the edges of neighborhood: at Commercial and Fleet Streets, Hanover and Cross Streets, and Atlantic Avenue and Long Wharf.

== Notable people ==
- Gennaro Angiulo, member of the Patriarca crime family
- Thomas Cass, military figure
- John Ciardi, poet and translator
- Tony DeMarco, boxer
- Salvatore DiMasi, Speaker of the Massachusetts House of Representatives
- John F. Fitzgerald, politician and grandfather of President John F. Kennedy
- Thomas Hutchinson, governor of Massachusetts Bay
- Rose Kennedy, philanthropist and mother of President John F. Kennedy
- Clementina Langone, civic leader
- Cotton Mather, Puritan minister
- Increase Mather, President of Harvard University
- John Mayo, Puritan minister
- Jane Mecom, the youngest sister of Benjamin Franklin
- Charles Ponzi, creator of the Ponzi scheme
- Paul Revere, noted activist and artisan
- George A. Scigliano, a Massachusetts state legislator and an early and influential North End community leader
- David Walker, abolitionist

== See also ==
- Italian Americans in Boston
