= North Square (Boston) =

Square in Boston, Massachusetts

Coordinates: 42°21′48.75″N 71°03′13.05″W

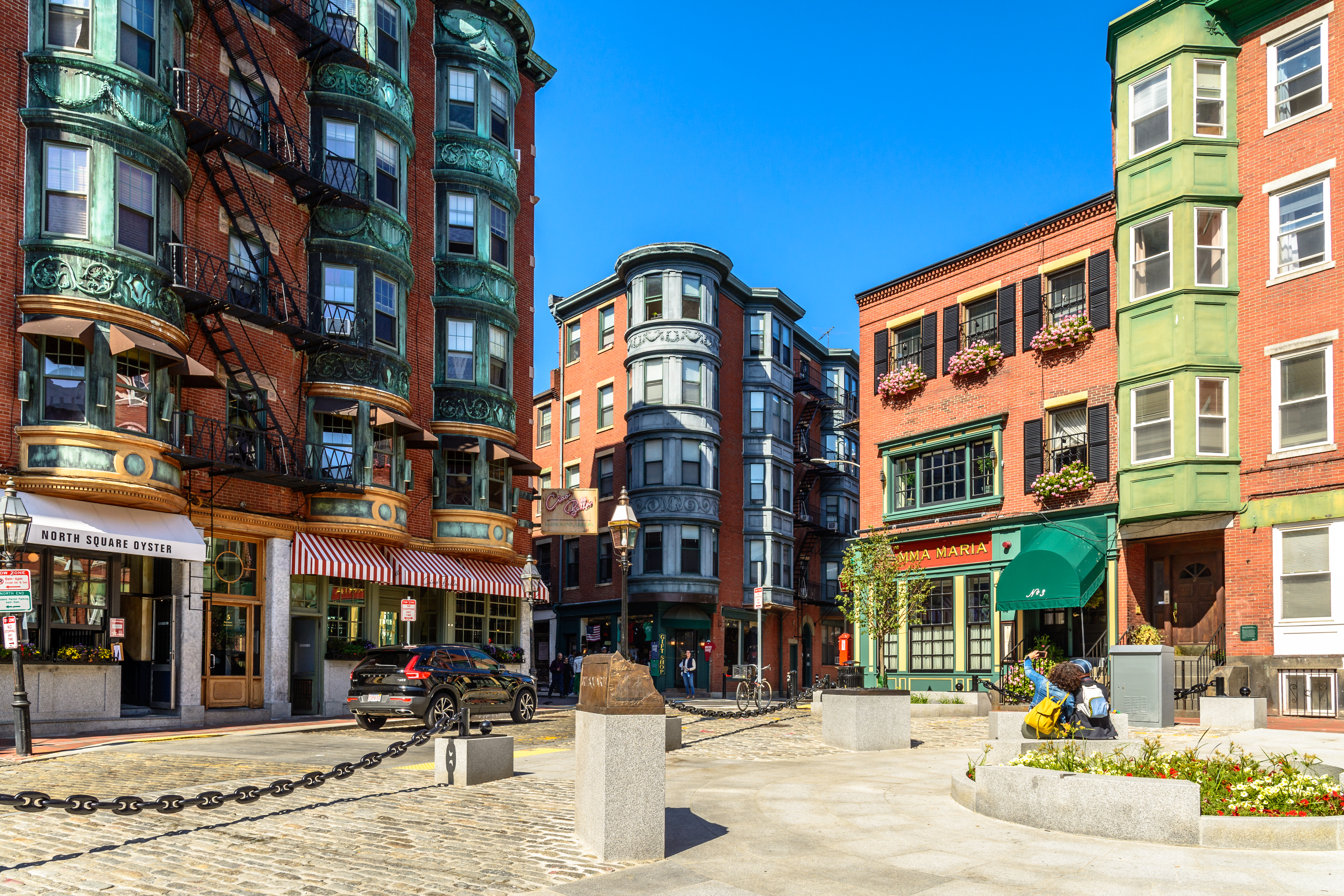
North Square in 2019, looking toward Prince Street (left) and Garden Court Street

North Square in the North End of Boston, Massachusetts, United States, sits at the intersection of Moon, Prince, North, Garden Court and Sun Court Streets. Paul Revere lived here, as did other notables in the 17th and 18th centuries. Prior to July 4, 1788, the area was known as Clarke's Square and, earlier on, as Frizel Square.

== History ==
In the 17th century, Old North Meeting House anchored the neighborhood. Its pastor was Increase Mather, who lived in the square until his residence was destroyed by fire. On November 27, 1676, Mather's home, the meeting house, and a total of 45 buildings in the North End were destroyed by a fire. The meeting house was rebuilt soon afterwards, and the Paul Revere House, now a museum, was later constructed on the site of the Mather House.

"In the eighteenth century Boston's two grandest houses were on North Square. ... William Clark, merchant, had a 3-story brick house with 26 lavish rooms, and nearby, facing the garden court, was John Foster's house, later occupied by Governor Hutchinson." John Pitcairn and John Downes also lived in the square.

After the death of George A. Scigliano in 1906, North End residents lobbied to build a monument to him in North Square and rename it Scigliano Square. Instead, the North End Park near Copp's Hill was renamed Scigliano Park in his honor.

In the 20th century, as was typical of the North End generally, predominantly Italian immigrants lived in the square.

Rachel Revere Park is a public park within North Square, dedicated in 1846 and named for local resident Rachel Walker Revere. Since the 1950s, North Square has been along the path of the Freedom Trail.

== Image gallery ==
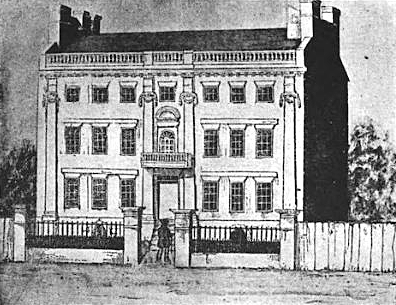
Foster-Hutchinson house, corner of Garden Court and Fleet St. Probably built ca.1686 by merchant John Foster. Occupied by merchant Thomas Hutchinson (d.1739) (father of Governor Hutchinson, who was born in the house)

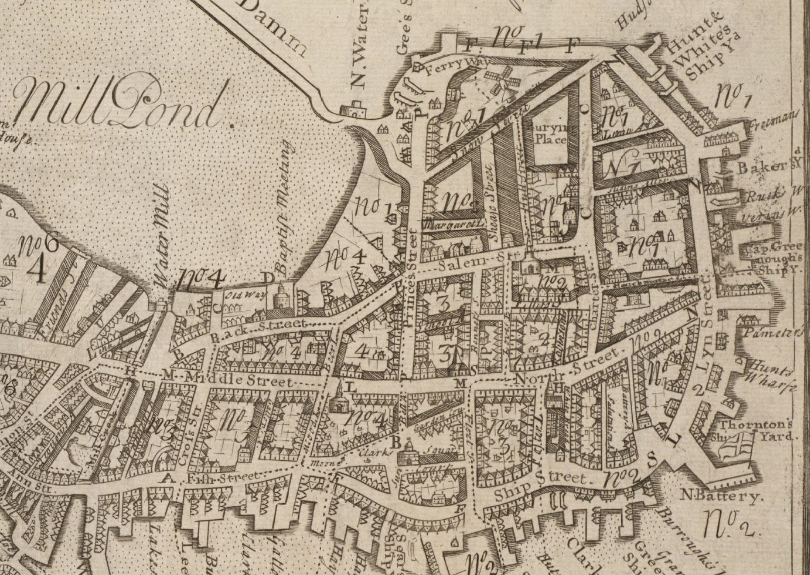
Detail of 1743 map of Boston, showing North End and Clark's Square (later North Square)

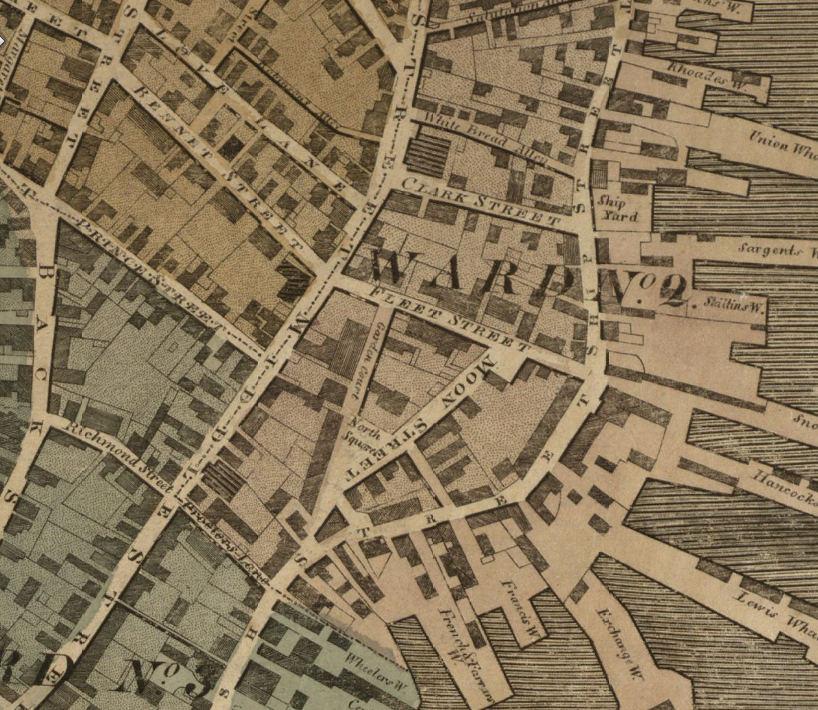
Detail of 1814 map of Boston, showing North Square

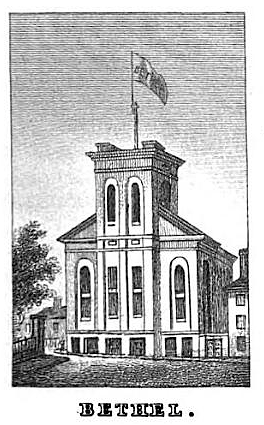
Bethel Church, built 1832

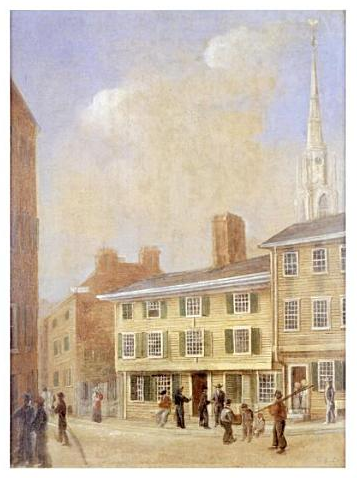
North Square, ca.1845, by Rupert Sadler

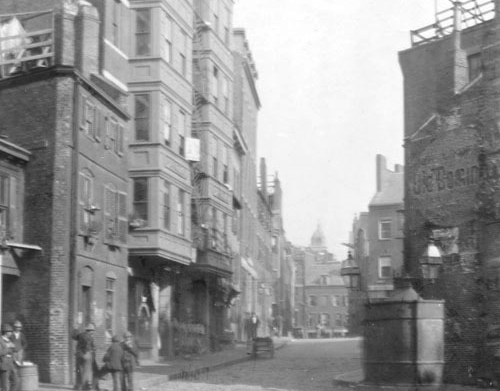
North Square and North Street, ca.1894

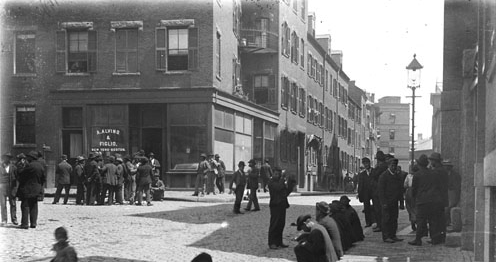
North Square, ca.1895

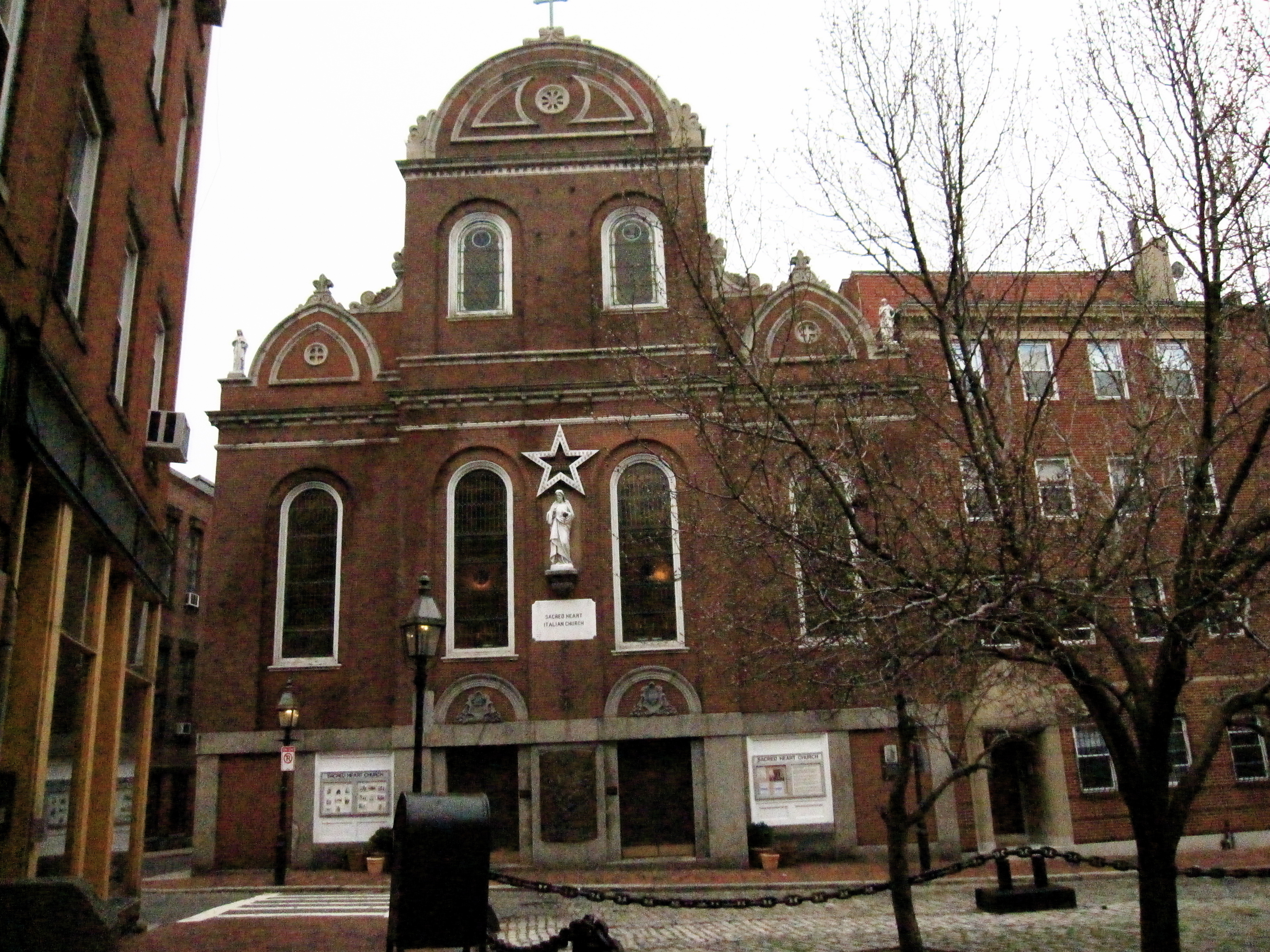
North Square, 2010

== See also ==
Listed on the National Register of Historic Places:

- Mariners House, located at 11 North Square
- Paul Revere House, located at 19 North Square
- Pierce–Hichborn House, located at 29 North Square
