= Paul Revere House =

Historic house in Boston, Massachusetts

- U.S. National Register of Historic Places
- U.S. National Historic Landmark
- U.S. Historic district – Contributing property
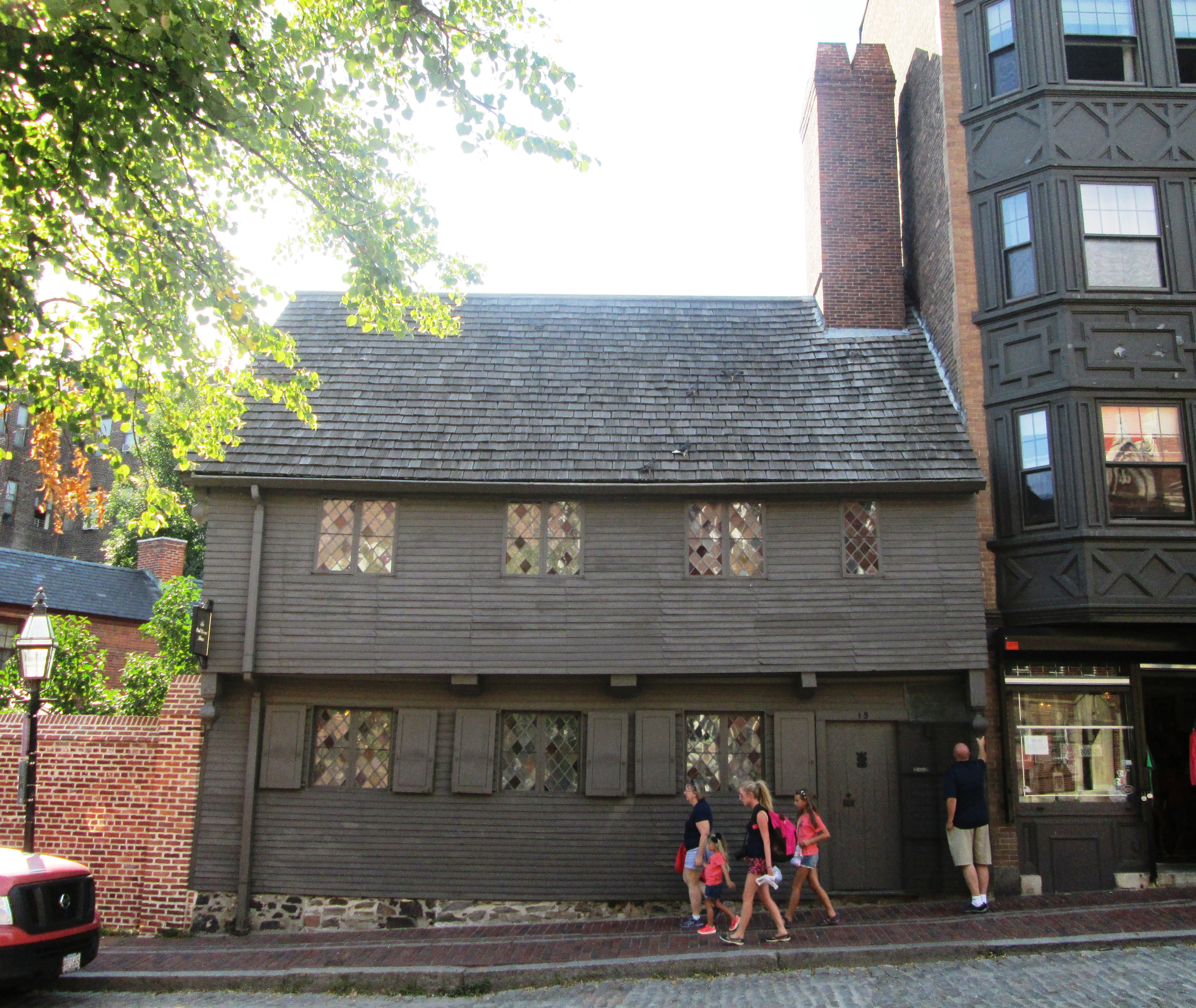
- Paul Revere House in 2017

- Location within Boston Location within Massachusetts Location within the United States
- Interactive map of Paul Revere House
- Location: 19 North Square, Boston, Massachusetts
- Coordinates: 42°21′50″N 71°03′13″W
- Built: c. 1676–1680
- Part of: Boston National Historical Park (ID74002222)
- NRHP reference No.: 66000785

Significant dates
- Added to NRHP: October 15, 1966
- Designated NHL: January 20, 1961
- Designated CP: October 26, 1974

The Paul Revere House is a historic house museum at 19 North Square in the North End of Boston, Massachusetts, United States. It was once the residence of Paul Revere, an American Patriot and Founding Father, during the American Revolution and late 18th century. The house is operated as a museum by the Paul Revere Memorial Association (PRMA), which owns the property. The Revere House is part of Boston National Historical Park and is designated as a National Historic Landmark.

The house occupies the former site of the Second Church of Boston's parsonage, destroyed by fire in 1676. The Revere House was built no later than 1680; its first owner was Robert Howard, a wealthy slave merchant. His L-shaped house contained exterior features such as a second-floor overhang and casement windows. Revere owned the house between 1770 and 1800. After Revere sold the house, it became a tenement, with its ground floor remodeled for use as shops, and was sold repeatedly in the 19th century. The Revere House was sold in 1902 to one of Revere's descendants, who resold it to the PRMA in 1907. Following a renovation, the house opened in 1908. A visitor center was opened within a nearby pair of houses in 2016.

The main block of the three-story dwelling consists of four structural bays. The second floor of the house protrudes above the street, while the roof contains a gable. The Revere House has a rear extension, typical of houses of the era; this extension also has a second-floor overhang. A third floor was added in the 18th century before being removed in the 1900s renovation. There are two rooms on each floor, which include plasterwork and woodwork decorations, along with architectural details such as fireplaces. The rooms contain several pieces of furniture that belonged to the Revere family.

== Site ==
The Paul Revere House is located at 19 North Square (Note: The address is sometimes given as 19–21 North Square.) in the North End neighborhood of Boston in Massachusetts, United States. Situated on Shawmut Peninsula, the Revere House occupies a landmass that existed prior to the peninsula's expansion via land reclamation. The site was originally about 150 feet (46 m) from the waterfront, but land reclamation has since pushed the shoreline to about 800 feet (240 m) from the house. The Revere House is on the northwest side of North Square. The land lot includes the Revere House, a courtyard just south of the building (originally the John Barnard House), and the Pierce–Hichborn House. The lot is significantly reduced from its original extent, covering about 1,475 square feet (137.0 m^{2}). Mariners House (11 North Square) is further south on the same block. The Paul Revere House site is a stop on the Freedom Trail, a path connecting historic sites in Boston, and is the trail's only house. Sequentially, it is between Faneuil Hall and Old North Church.

The house's courtyard is paved in brick with some small plots of greenery. It has a 900-pound (410 kg) bronze bell manufactured by American Patriot and silversmith Paul Revere, who once lived in the house. When Revere lived there in the late 18th century, the yard had a well, and a path in the rear led to Hanover Street. By the 1980s, period plantings from between the late 17th and late 18th centuries had also been placed in the yard. These included lungwort, pear trees, and johnny jump ups.

The Pierce–Hichborn House is a brick edifice built c. 1711; it is one of the earliest brick houses in the city. Built by Moses Pierce, it was the onetime residence of Revere's cousin Nathaniel Hichborn and is part of the Paul Revere House museum complex. The Sumner Tunnel runs directly under the lot, passing under the Pierce–Hichborn House. A third house once existed between the Revere and Pierce–Hichborn houses, but was later replaced by a tenement, which itself was demolished. There is also a 3,500-square-foot (330 m^{2}) visitor and education center connected to the house by an elevated walkway; this facility occupies two row houses. These rowhouses, dating from c. 1835 and rising two stories high, carry the address 5–6 Lathrop Place and are alternatively known as the Perkins-Robinson Double Rowhouse. In the late 18th century, the site of these rowhouses had a barn, which sat partially on the lot line.

== History ==
Shawmut Peninsula was first settled soon after the town of Boston was established by colonists in 1630. The first recorded owner of the Revere House's site was Bartholomew Bernard, a carpenter. The merchant Anthony Chickly acquired part of the front portion of Bernard's lot in 1663 and constructed a new house there, and Chickly subsequently acquired an adjacent lot in the rear. Chickly sold his property in 1670 to the Second Church in Boston, whose minister Increase Mather lived in the Chickly House until at least 1674. Other family members, including Mather's son Cotton Mather, also lived there. When the Chickly House burned down in the Boston fire on November 27, 1676, Mather moved to a house owned by Captain Thomas Bredon.

=== Residential use ===
==== Early owners ====
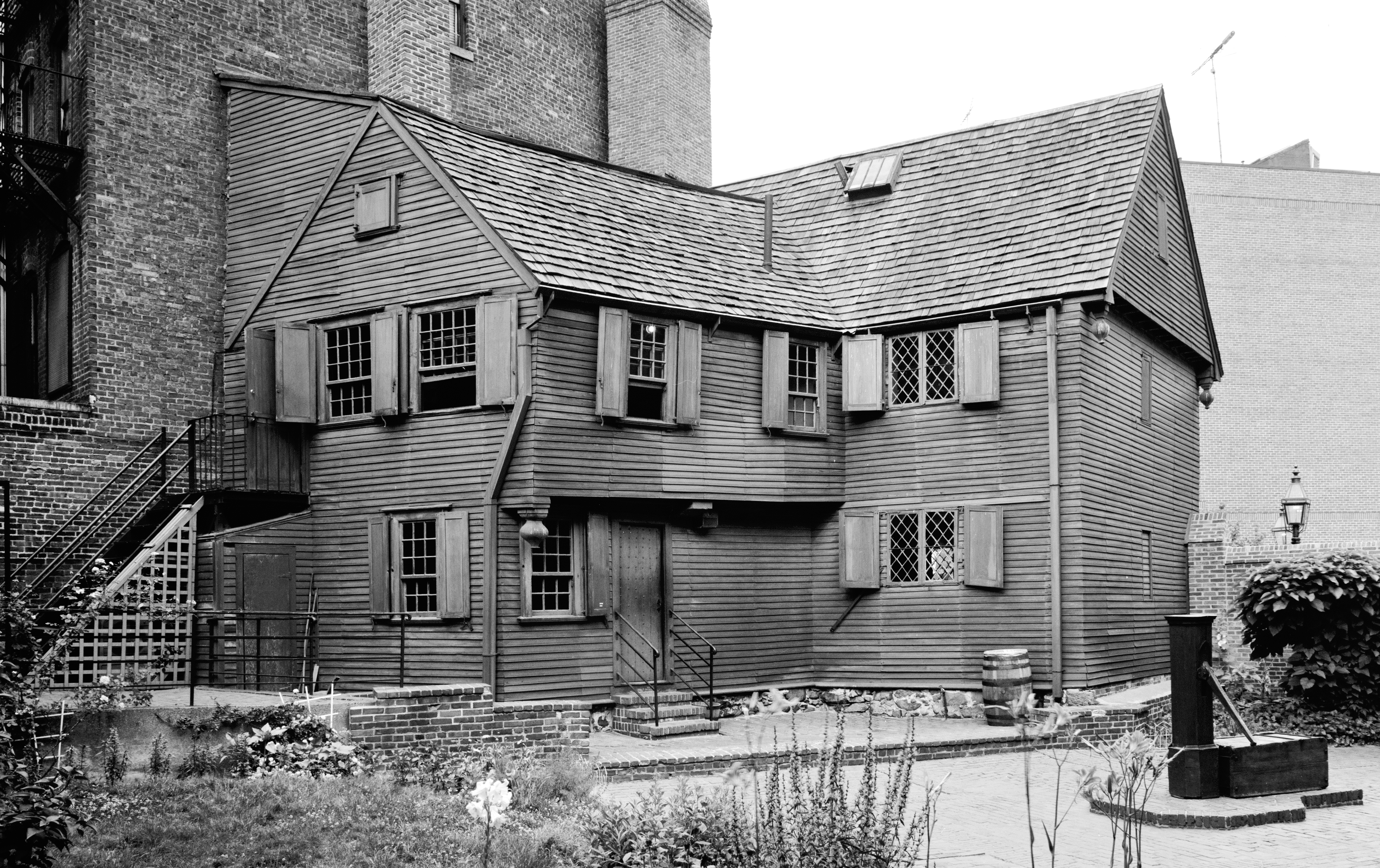
A Historic American Buildings Survey (HABS) image of the rear elevation

The house that is now known as the Paul Revere House was built on the site of Mather's house at some point between 1676 and 1681. The house is sometimes described as being built shortly after the 1676 fire, and several sources give a specific date of 1680. (Note: Sources give dates as early as 1676 or 1677. Older dates predating the fire, such as 1660, have been given.) The merchant Robert Howard is the earliest known owner of the house. On November 2, 1681, Howard purchased the property and an existing dwelling from brickmaker Thomas Walker and anchor manufacturer Daniel Turell. Researcher Stephen J. Roper wrote that Walker and Turell became involved in the sale because they were members of the Second Church. As originally configured, the house had an irregular layout because, like many buildings in Boston's North End at the time, the lot line ran at an oblique angle to the street. The second story overhung the sidewalk, and the building had a steep pitched roof and a chimney. The building was relatively large for its time.

The house was becoming outdated by the early 18th century, when brick houses were built elsewhere in the city. Howard bought two adjoining parcels in the 1680s and took three mortgages on the properties between 1714 and 1716. Early in the house's history, a rear ell was added to the house, giving the house an L-shaped floor plan; the ell ran along the oblique lot line. Howard died in 1717, but ownership remained in the Howard family for over two decades. He bequeathed the house to Elizabeth, his widow, who seems to have passed ownership to their daughter Sarah Wyborn. In 1741, Wyborn sold the house to a sailor, Andrew Knox. Knox lived there until his death in 1752, after which his son Andrew Jr. took ownership. John Erving then placed a mortgage loan on the house. When Andrew Jr. was unable to pay the mortgage in 1763, Erving took ownership and rented out the house to Andrew. At some point in the 1760s, the oak beams in the house were covered with a molding designed in the American colonial style.

==== Revere family ====
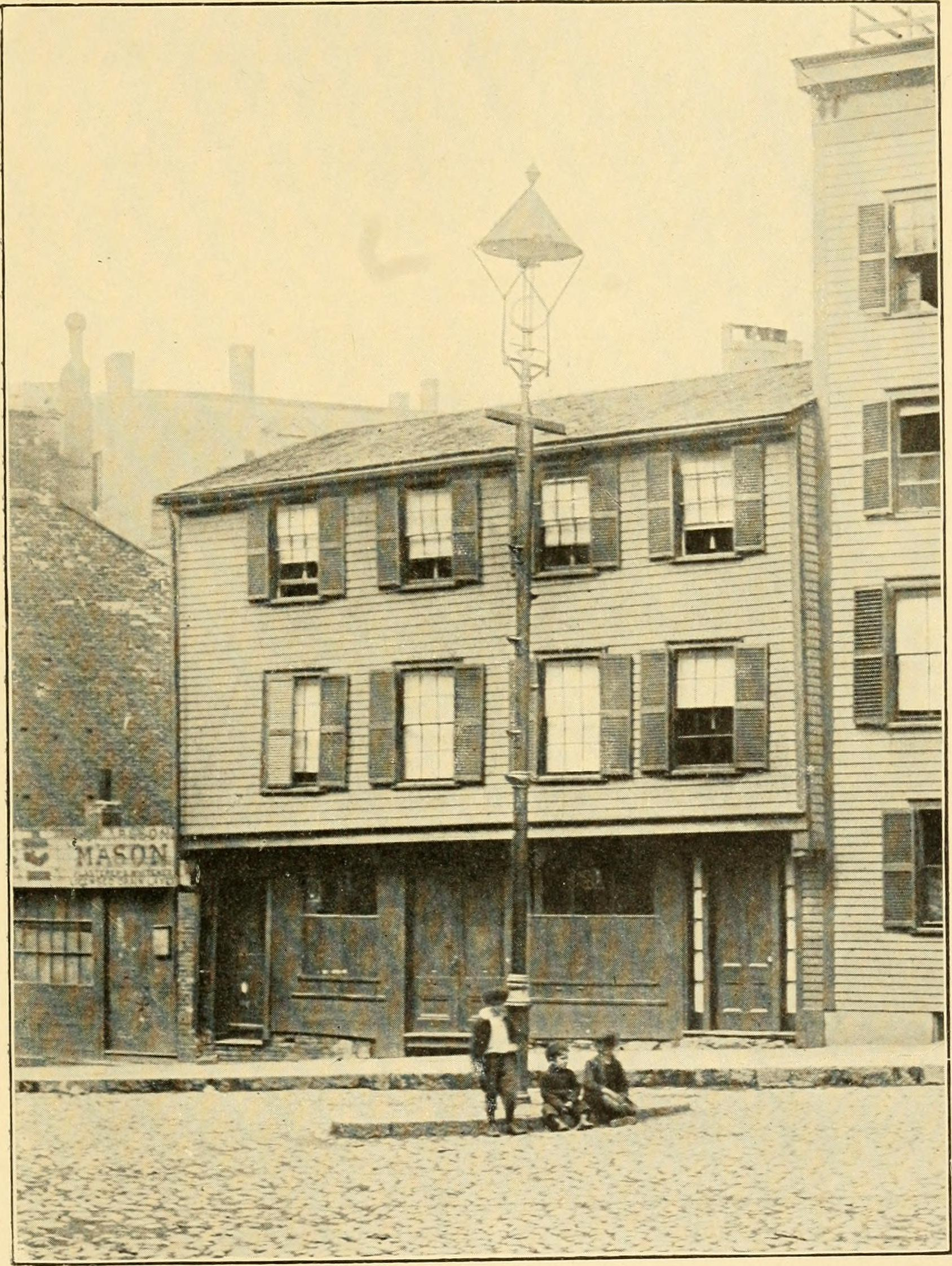
The house as depicted in a publication about Revere

Paul Revere acquired the house at 21 North Square on January 13, 1770, obtaining the deed from John Erving. The property cost just over 213 Massachusetts pounds, a significant expense for Revere. At the time, he was a lower-middle-income craftsman who earned £85 annually and had £20 in savings. Revere took a mortgage on the house, which he later repaid in full. By then, the house had been expanded to three stories, and the rear ell had been extended with the addition of a kitchen. Also, wood-frame buildings such as 21 North Square had fallen out of favor as Bostonians preferred brick houses. Revere was a silversmith and hardware manufacturer. Although he was later known for his involvement in events preceding the American Revolution, Revere could not afford to devote significant time to the Revolution, and his involvement in the Revolution did not become widely publicized until Henry Wadsworth Longfellow's poem "Paul Revere's Ride" was published in 1860.

Revere moved there with his five children and his first wife Sarah, along with his mother. Revere moved his own and his mother's belongings into the house. Most of Revere's remaining children were born there, and as such, many of his new furniture purchases may have included bedroom furnishings. Paul and Sarah Revere had two more children after moving to North Square. When Sarah died in 1773, the family had eight children. (Note: One source cites the Reveres as having seven children when Sarah died; in actuality, Sarah had died in childbirth, so there were eight children.) Paul married his second wife, Rachel, that year. Paul and Rachel Revere had another seven or eight children while residing at the Revere House. Because the family had to support so many children, they had little disposable income. No more than seven of the Revere children lived at the house simultaneously. Some of Revere's offspring died in childhood, while others moved out. The former third floor, and a lean-to next to the house, helped Revere accommodate his large family. A contemporary deed indicates that Revere also built a barn behind his house, which partially protruded into a neighboring lawn.

On March 6, 1771, for the first anniversary of the Boston Massacre of 1770, Revere hung pictures of the incident from his window. He repeated this for the next several anniversaries of the incident. Revere also participated in the Boston Tea Party protest while living in the house. In 1775, amid the American Revolution, Revere started his midnight ride from the house. The same year, the family evacuated the town during the British Siege of Boston, taking their belongings; the rear barn may have been destroyed at this time. From 1778 onward, five of Revere's daughters and three sons reached adulthood and moved out of the house; this increased Revere's disposable income, since he no longer had to pay their expenses. Revere moved out of the building in May 1780, taking a residence on Charter Street. He first rented the North Square house to the tailor George Defrance, then to the painter Joseph Dunkerly. Revere gave a mortgage on the house to Samuel Hichborn in 1787 or 1788, around the same time that he established a successful foundry.

Revere may have moved back into the North Square house by 1790, but his family's whereabouts during the early 1790s are not well-recorded, and he may have lived elsewhere prior to 1786. Revere finally bought the Charter Street house in 1799 and subsequently moved there. The next year, he sold the North Square house to the trader John Hunting, who owned it for one day. Retrospectively, one observer called the house "the most obvious reminder of Revere in Boston", and another called Revere the house's "greatest claim to fame".

=== Commercial use ===
==== Early and mid-19th century ====
The next owner after Hunting was Jonathan Merry, possibly a relative of one of the area's very first settlers, who owned it for about three years. The house and the surrounding 1/3 acre (0.13 ha) of land, including the passageway leading back to Middle Street, were placed for sale in 1803. The merchant John Loring obtained the Revere House that year. Loring likely rented out the house, as indicated by records in 1821, which indicate that someone named James Cawley lived there. By then, the North End was increasingly populated by recent immigrants, and houses in the North End were being converted for tenement use; the neighborhood had also become known as a red-light district. Sailors began using the house as lodging for about three decades beginning in the 1820s.

When Loring died, he bequeathed the house to his daughter Lydia in 1833. Documents show that Lydia also did not live at the house and that she used it purely for real estate investment, renting out the Revere House and splitting up the parcel. In December 1835, two of the rear parcels at 5–6 Lathrop Place were sold to two housewrights: Jonathan Robinson and John Perkins. They built two attached structures there as part of a group of four rowhouses.

==== Late 19th century ====
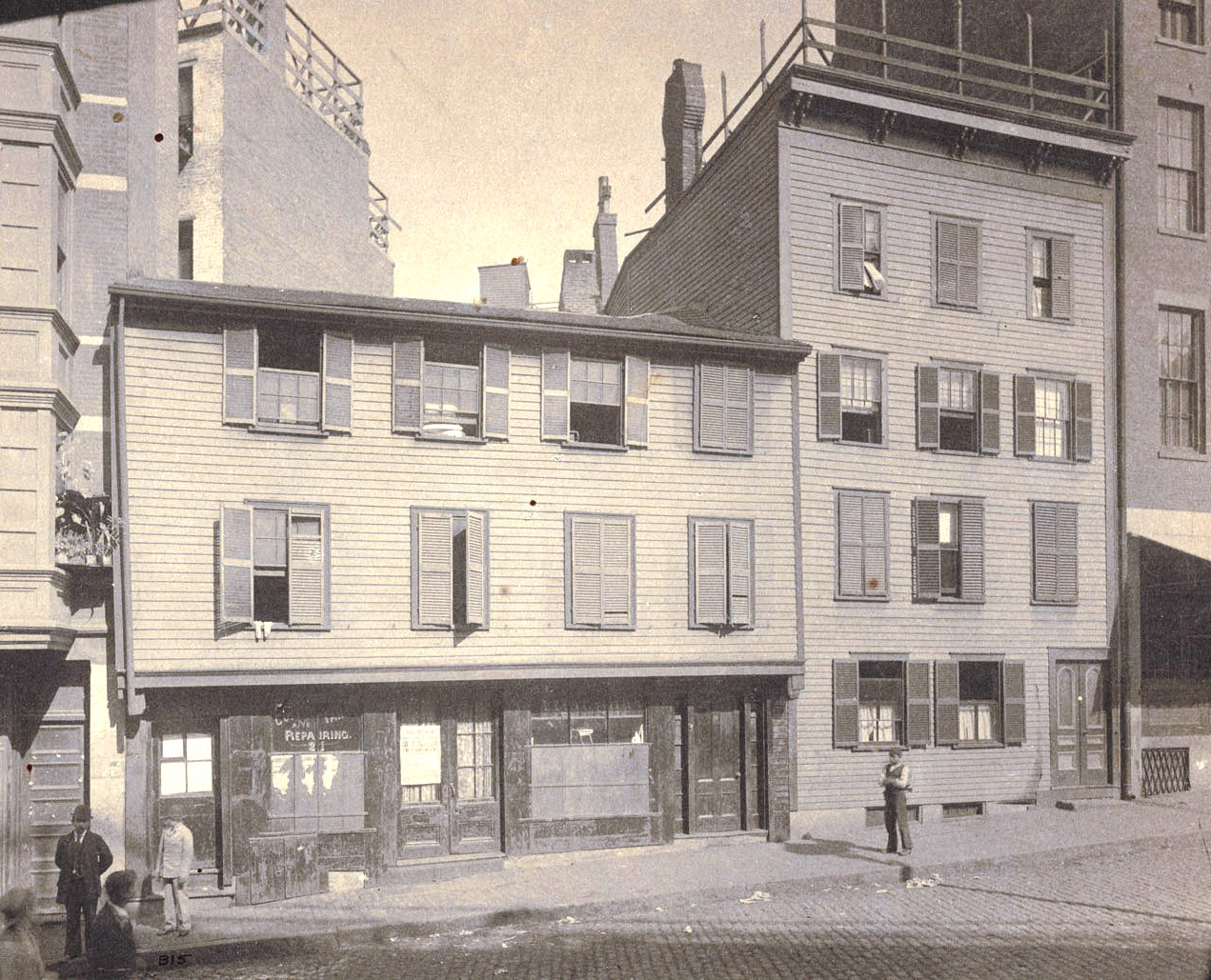
The Revere House (left) c. 1898

By the late 19th century, although the upper stories remained in use as lodging, the ground story was subdivided into stores. James K. Fagin acquired the house from the Loring family in 1867 and within six days had sold it to Catherine Wilkie. For much of the late 19th century, the Revere House was neglected. Wilkie operated a boarding house in the Revere House, likely occupied by Irish or Italians, though later researchers could not ascertain the residents' exact ethnicities. Neighboring buildings were home to lower-class laborers, many of whom were Irish or Italian. The area was so densely developed with tenements that, if these buildings had burned down, the Revere House was in danger of burning as well.

It was likely under Wilkie's ownership that a privy (outhouse) vault was built on the property. A rear ell is depicted in maps from 1867 and 1874, but this ell may have been removed by 1883. A single-story store had been built on the site of the former Barnard House, immediately to the south, by 1872 and was occupied by the mason J. G. Carlson at some point prior to 1875. Afterward, the liquor and cigar salesman James Wilkie is listed as operating a store there. In 1891, at the instigation of a friend who owned a nearby site, the businessman Sidney F. Squires acquired the site and built the Angelo Building on part of the old Barnard site. The family who had lived at the Revere House for thirty years was forced to move out, and the house was again rented out for commercial use. A Boston Daily Globe article from 1886 wrote that the house had three front doors and four windows per floor; the ground floor had a shoe store.

By the 1890s, the lower-floor tenants included a cigar shop and a grocer; the rear kitchen was used for storage. A reporter for the Chicago Daily Tribune in 1894 wrote that the grocery store's operator was unaware of who Revere was, let alone that he had once lived in the house. The second floor had a cigar maker, and other upper-floor tenants may have included a newspaper publisher, a bank, and a boarding house. The house was in poor condition. The walls had been painted over, the house was poorly heated, and all the closets had been removed. The Boston Daily Globe wrote that little of the original interior remained except for the doors, and that the garden had long since been split up; another newspaper described the environs as having "no hint of greenness anywhere". The facade had been covered over with signage, and a commemorative plaque was affixed to the exterior in the 1890s. The grocery store's operator wanted to find tenants for the upper stories, and even though the house attracted visitors from across the U.S., it was slated for redevelopment due to its poor condition and lack of profitability. The neighboring sites had been redeveloped with brick structures. The house caught fire in 1901 but sustained little damage.

=== Museum use ===
==== 1900s acquisition and renovation ====
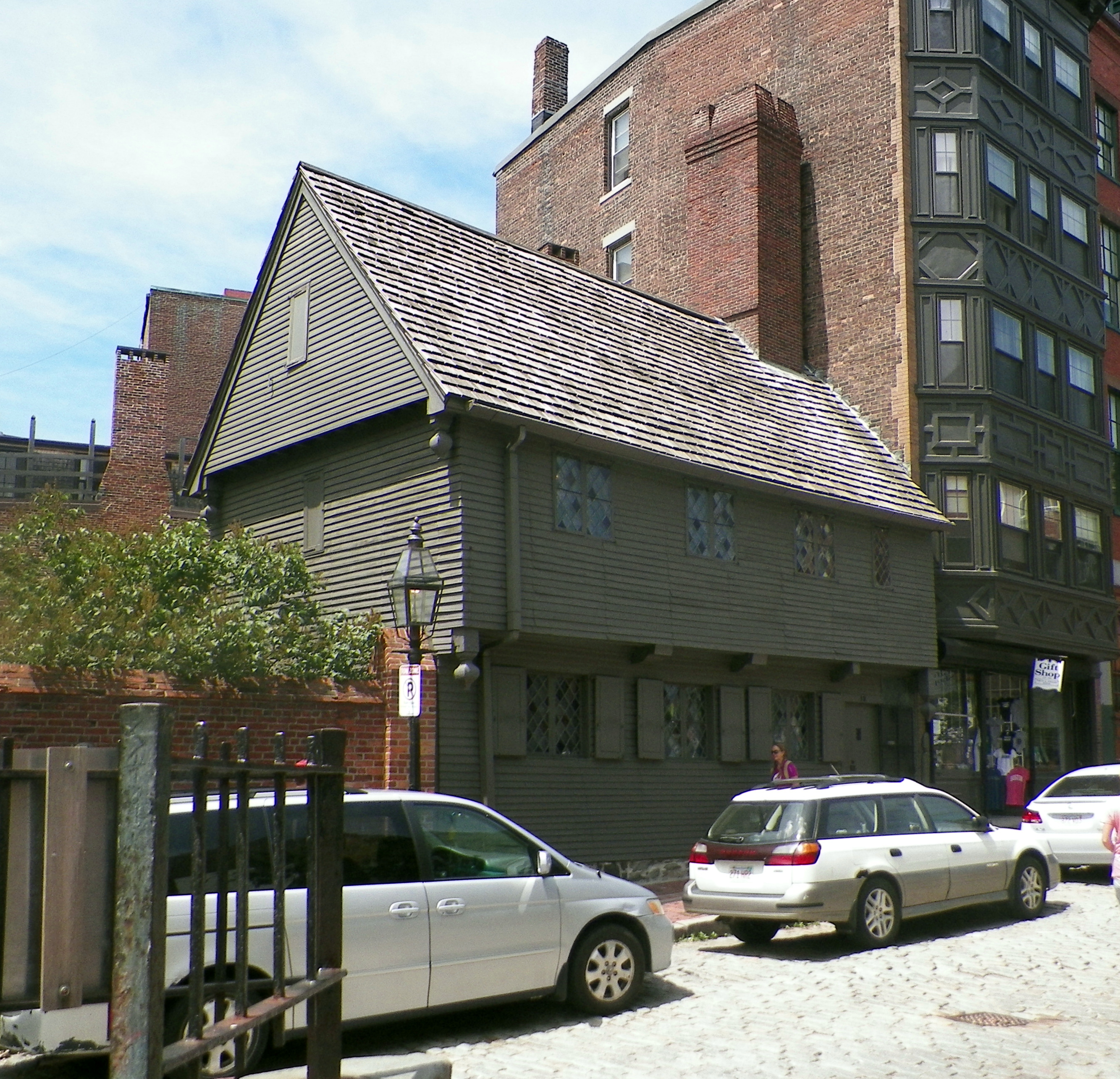
The house seen from Rachel Revere Square, directly across North Square

In December 1902, the Paul Revere House and other property at 19–21 North Square was conveyed to developer John P. Reynolds Jr., who was also Revere's descendant. Reynolds said at the time that he was interested in Boston's history and that he regretted "the changes which are rapidly obliterating so many of its historic buildings". The Paul Revere Memorial Association (PRMA) was established in April 1905 and set out to raise $30,000, (Note: Equivalent to $810,000 in 2024) the exact price that Reynolds had paid for the property. The organization sought to make the house a patriotic symbol for the North End; the neighborhood, at the time, was occupied largely by immigrants. At the house's public opening years later, one newspaper would write that the presence of immigrants "alone disturbed the historical accuracy of the scene".

The PRMA collected donations of between $0.25 and $1,000 apiece, (Note: Equivalent to $7–27,000 in 2024) including many small contributions from schoolchildren; it had raised $7,100 by that June. (Note: Equivalent to $192,000 in 2024) Fundraising slowed down through 1906, and the committee had raised $12,200 by September of that year. (Note: Equivalent to $318,000 in 2024) This was still insufficient to fund the house's immediate needs—for example, the PRMA could fund only half of the $6,000 needed for repairs (Note: Equivalent to $157,000 in 2024)—but Reynolds agreed to transfer ownership at the $12,200 price. Even after the price had been reduced, the PRMA wished to raise another $18,000 for furnishings, repairs, and an endowment fund. (Note: Equivalent to $486,000 in 2024) Reynolds agreed in December 1906 to transfer the house's title to several members of the PRMA, and the association finalized its acquisition in June 1907, obtaining the house and 1,475 square feet (137.0 m^{2}) of land. Existing tenants were allowed to remain for some time while they looked for new housing.

Restoration took place under the guidance of architect and historic preservationist Joseph Everett Chandler, with assistance from groups such as the Sons of the Revolution, Daughters of the Revolution (DR), and Daughters of the American Revolution (DAR). The Revere House had undergone significant changes over the years, which had been poorly documented; this contrasted with Boston's old, preserved public buildings, (Note: Specifically Faneuil Hall, Old South Meeting House, Old State House, and New State House) whose changes were well documented. As such, there was limited archeological data. Chandler restored the house to a mixture of styles from the 17th and 18th centuries. The existing roof was removed, and the house was restored mostly to its original two-story appearance, with a steep pitched roof. Workers excavated dozens of cartloads of debris from the cellar, uncovering various artifacts such as tools, paper, cloth, horseshoes, and spikes. During the renovation, workers discovered pieces of the original moldings and boards, and they also uncovered other objects such as utensils and the Reveres' old well. After discovering a piece of pre-1790 wallpaper, Chandler had it reproduced and reinstalled throughout the house. By late 1907, the renovation was in danger of being halted due to lack of funds. Massachusetts governor Curtis Guild Jr. supported the PRMA's efforts.

==== 1900s to 1950s ====
The house opened to the public on April 18, 1908, coinciding with the 133rd anniversary of Revere's midnight ride. When it opened, it charged a 25-cent admission fee (Note: Equivalent to $6 in 2024) and was open every day. The house still needed about $4,000 in repairs. (Note: Equivalent to $98,000 in 2024) The DAR's Paul Revere chapter agreed to fund the restoration of the second floor's front room and donated several depictions of Revere's art. The DR's Peter Faneuil chapter furnished another room, paying for a fireplace. By 1909, more furnishings had been added. In the museum's first few years of operation, most visitors came from outside Boston, and relatively few children visited the house. Annual reenactments of Revere's midnight ride were also hosted at the house. The Revere House was a popular attraction through the early 20th century, with thousands of visitors.

The DAR established its Old North chapter there in 1911. To reduce the risk of fire at the Revere House, in 1915, Municipal Building Commissioner Patrick O'Hearn ordered that the frame structure at 17 North Square be demolished. Later in the decade, Boston's city planning board proposed demolishing additional buildings around the house, creating a park around it. By the 1920s, there were efforts to have the PRMA buy the houses on either side of the Revere House. One of the adjoining houses had been offered to the PRMA, which could not afford the acquisition. Throughout the years, Chandler sought additional interior furnishings for the house on behalf of the PRMA, consulting with the association's president William B. Revere. Chandler obtained a lantern on the first floor in 1927 to address illumination issues, and he sought additional objects in the mid-1930s, including curtains, a clock case, new wallpapers, and carpets. The Revere House avoided burning down when the neighboring Angelo Building (Note: The Boston Globe describes the burned building as a five-story structure at 25 North Square, which corresponds with the description of the Angelo Building as given in Public Archaeology Laboratory 2014. However, the Public Archaeology Laboratory describes the Angelo Building as having burned down in 1938.) caught fire in 1937, casting sparks onto the roof.

By about the 1940s, during the off-peak season, the ground-floor living room was used as a gift shop and had a sign-in desk. During the peak season, these functions were moved to the second-floor rear room. The Angelo Building was torn down in 1941, and the PRMA bought the land the next year. The group had added brick pavement around the Revere House by the end of the decade. There was still another tenement building on the opposite side of the house, despite efforts to remove it. In the mid-20th century, the house was open on weekdays except for holidays; it was briefly open on Sundays after World War II following an emergency order from the mayor's office. A plot across North Square was converted into a park in 1946, named after Rachel Revere, and a plaque commemorating Paul Revere was also installed across the street.

==== 1950s to 1990s ====
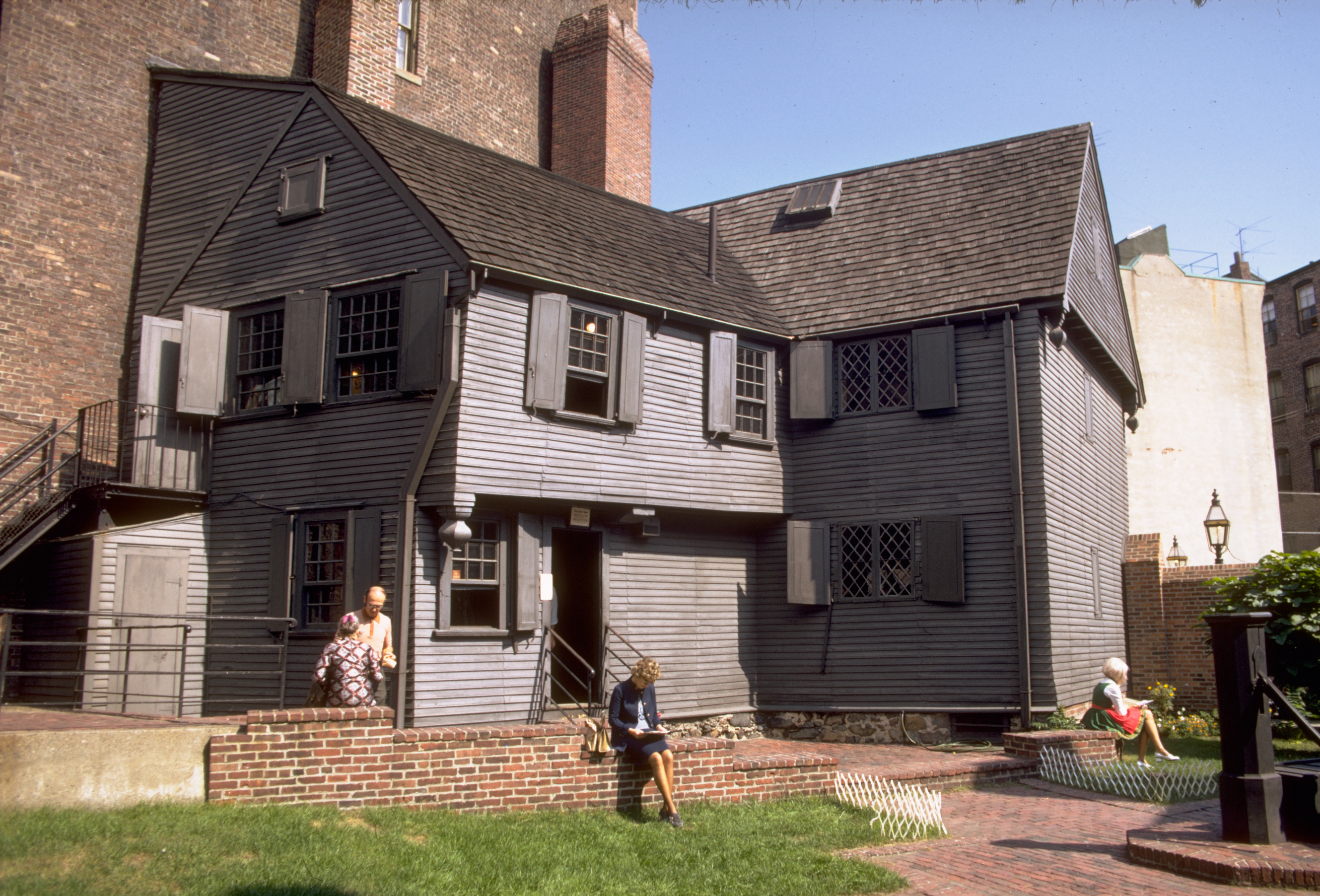
View of the ell from the rear yard

The neighboring Pierce–Hichborn House was opened to the public in 1950, at which point the Revere House had about 35,000 annual visitors. It still attracted many visitors who often took pictures of the two houses and the courtyard; by then, the Revere House was closed on Sundays. During the decade, the city's Public Improvement Commission proposed tearing down 116 nearby tenements in an attempt to attract visitors to the Paul Revere and Pierce–Hichborn houses. At the time, the houses were difficult to access due to the narrow street grid. Had the plan been carried out, there would have been a park and driveway surrounding the Revere and Pierce–Hichborn houses. The Boston National Historic Sites Commission, a federal commission that was considering designating several sites in Boston as a national historic park, also recommended removing some buildings around the two houses. The Revere House's rear kitchen was damaged by fire in 1959, but the house sustained little damage and quickly reopened.

By the 1960s, visitors frequently confused the Revere and Pierce–Hichborn houses, which at the time functioned as separate museums. Only the Revere House was designated as part of the Freedom Trail and, thus, was sought out by more visitors. When the Revere House was closed on Sundays, prospective visitors often toured the Pierce–Hichborn House instead. Tours were led by non-professional guides, including boys aged six or seven who lived in the area. The Revere House was, at the time, one of the few sites on the Freedom Trail to charge an admission fee. To attract visitors, the section of North Square in front of the Revere and Pierce–Hichborn houses was rebuilt in cobblestone in the mid-1960s, giving the area a more colonial feel. By then, the Revere House had 100,000 annual visitors. After the PRMA acquired the Pierce–Hichborn House in 1970, that house was intermittently opened to the public. The exhibits focused on Revere's midnight ride until the 1970s, when the PRMA first hired professionals to operate the museum; this transition to professional staff was led by Paul Revere Jr., a descendant of Revere's and a longtime PRMA president. The professional staff refocused the exhibits and events to be about Revere's personal life. When the building became part of the Boston National Historical Park the next year, it needed an estimated $25,000 in repairs. Unlike several other sites in the park, which were taken over the National Park Service (NPS), the Paul Revere House remained a separate entity; the NPS's involvement was limited to financial support.

The rear upstairs bedroom opened for public visitation in 1983, following a two-year renovation. By then, the house hosted workshops and children's playdates. In the mid-1980s, the building underwent additional repairs and received new exhibits; for example, the khaki-green facade was repainted gray. The appearance of the house's courtyard was also restored to that of Revere's era. By the 1990s, the house had 200,000 annual visitors. Patronage peaked each April on Patriots' Day, around the anniversary of Revere's midnight ride. After a painting was stolen in 1993, the PRMA contemplated increasing security, which at the time consisted solely of two staffers patrolling the rooms. Although visitation declined through the decade, corresponding to the decreasing popularity of sites on the Freedom Trail, the house was still popular, with long queues to visit the house during peak times. It was open seven days a week most of the year, but closed on winter Mondays and holidays.

==== 2000s to present ====
As part of an art installation in 2001, the artists Laura Baring-Gould and Michael Dowling constructed a small, temporary copper-and-silver structure in the courtyard. By then, the Revere House was the third-most visited site on the trail (after the Old North Church and USS Constitution), and there were around 230,000 annual visitors. Also in the early 2000s, Colombo Yogurt raised $50,000 for the house's preservation. Another artwork by Niho Kozuru was displayed in the courtyard in 2004. The PRMA bought two adjacent buildings at Lathrop Place in 2007; the organization planned to renovate the residences into a visitor center and add an elevator. At the time, only the first story was partially accessible via a portable ramp. The renovation was expected to cost $4 million. In preparation for the renovation, in 2008, the PRMA announced plans to conduct archeological studies of the site. The same year, the association celebrated the museum's centennial.

In 2010, the PRMA began a fundraising campaign for the museum expansion. The project was supposed to receive $400,000 from the United States Senate, which, the same year, voted down an appropriation containing the funding. The renovation included renovating the courtyard, along with adding exhibit spaces and offices. The renovations permitted wheelchair users to access the second floor of the house for the first time, while classrooms and a library allowed for expanded research and educational outreach. The Paul Revere House's land lot was the site of archeological investigations between 2011 and 2013, which uncovered about 10,000 items; some of the artifacts unearthed in the investigations, such as a colored path, were left exposed. The PRMA completed its renovation of the Lathrop Place houses in December 2016, opening a visitor center there. At the time, the building recorded nearly 320,000 annual visitors.

The portion of North Square in front of the house was renovated in 2017. That year, archeologists also began studying the Revere House's old outdoor privy (next to the Pierce–Hichborn House); they found objects such as pottery shards, Italian glass, a clasp, and animal bones. During the COVID-19 pandemic in Massachusetts, in 2020, the house was temporarily closed, and events were hosted online. When the house reopened that year, visitation was restricted to eight people at a time due to social distancing restrictions. By 2025, the house had 250,000 annual visitors.

== Architecture ==
The Paul Revere House is designed in the First Period style, a colonial American architectural style. The modern-day house is two stories high. Behind the main house is a two-story ell, the presence of which gives the house an "L"-shaped floor plan. Although the house retains much of its original configuration, many of the interior materials and all of the exterior materials were replaced when the building became a museum in 1907–1908. The 1900s renovation also included Colonial Revival decorations by Joseph Everett Chandler. Since then, the house has maintained largely the same configuration, despite having undergone several restorations. The historian Walter Muir Whitehill wrote that the house had been so extensively modified from its 18th-century appearance that Revere "would not recognize it as the house in which he long lived". Other sources in the 2000s wrote that that the building retained 90% of its original design.

The Revere House is the oldest surviving residence in Downtown Boston. It is also the neighborhood's only wooden dwelling from that era; similar houses in the North End have burned down over the years. Some sources have erroneously cited the Revere House as Boston's oldest extant house of any type or the city's oldest frame building; this distinction belongs to the James Blake House (1661) in Dorchester. The Revere and Blake houses, along with the Pierce House (also in Dorchester), are the only three 17th-century buildings known to remain in Boston; others from that era have been demolished due to urban renewal or lost to fires. Even in the late 19th and early 20th centuries, it was one of the few remaining colonial residences in Boston with overhanging second stories.

=== Exterior ===
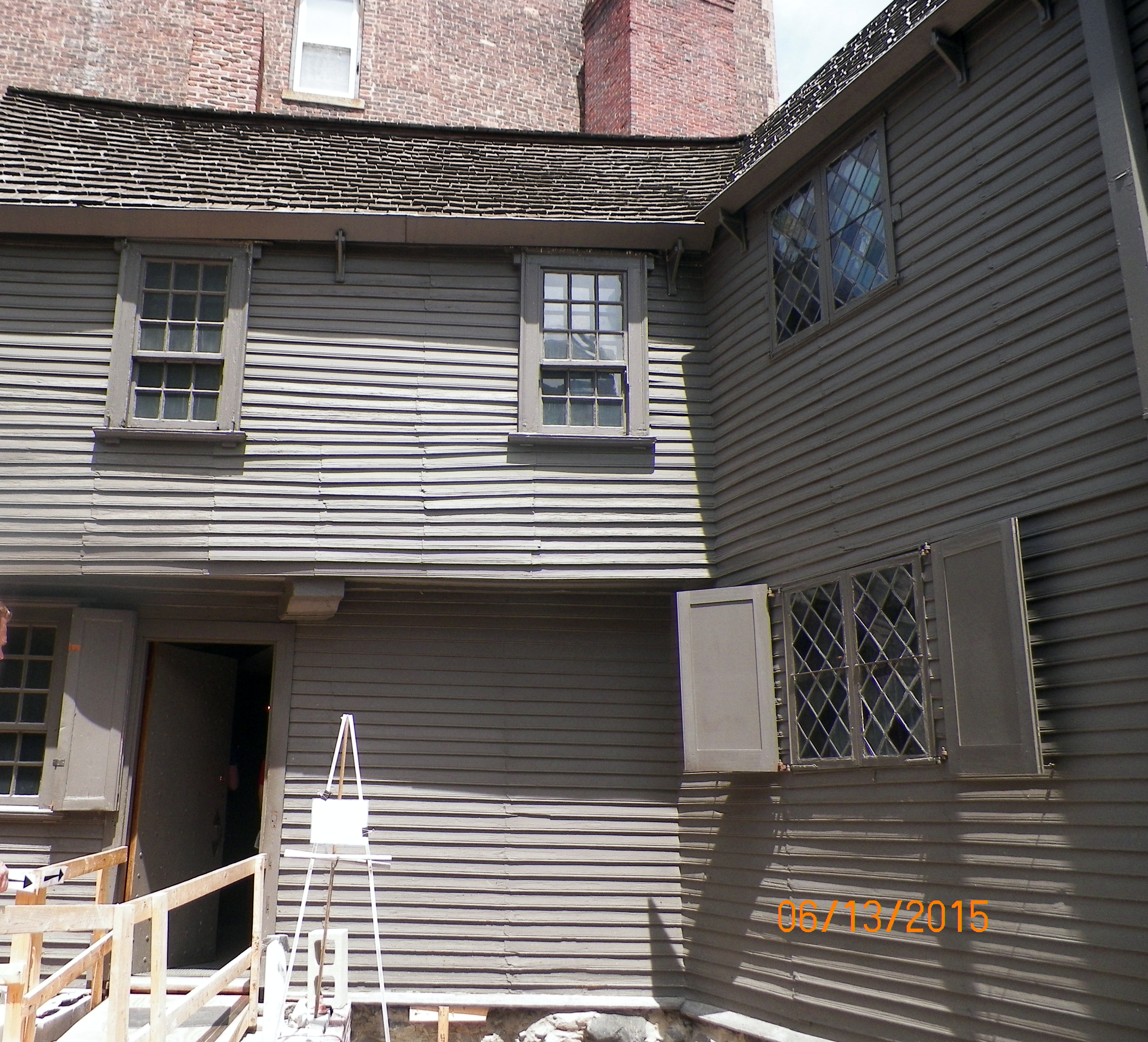
Facade of the main building (right) and rear ell (left)

The foundation is made of brick and fieldstone, while the cladding is made of clapboard. The facade's clapboards originally had molded edges, which were unique to colonial houses in Massachusetts. Wooden shutters are installed next to the windows on the first story. The eastern, street-facing elevation of the main section's facade is divided vertically into four bays. The northernmost of these bays contains the wooden first floor, next to which is a hitching post and a wooden drainage spout. The overhanging second story of the main elevation is cantilevered above the sidewalk, with exposed beams under the overhangs. The overhangs were supported by transverse summer beams and chimney girts, an unusual design even for the time, as cantilevered second stories tended to be supported only by girts. The main elevation has rectangular casement windows grouped in pairs, with rhombus-shaped panes, similar to those of other buildings constructed in the Massachusetts Bay Colony during that time. A sign with the house's name is placed on the second story.

The main portion's southern elevation is one bay wide. Because of the proximity of the former Barnard House, windows originally could not be installed on the southern elevation. Rectangular openings on the second floor and attic were added in the 1940s after a nearby building was demolished. The first floor of the southern elevation has a blind opening with clapboards. The western elevation has similar rhombus-shaped panes to the eastern elevation; these windows were installed to counterbalance the original lack of windows on the southern elevation.

The ell runs at a slight diagonal from the northern lot line, creating an obtuse angle where the ell meets the main portion of the building. The ell has a door on its southern elevation, which is designed identically to the front door. The second story of the ell over overhangs the first story on its southern elevation. The facade of the ell has wood-framed sash windows, which are arranged somewhat irregularly. The sash windows have protruding windowsills at their bottoms and lintels at their tops. The house has a steeply pitched roof, with a gable that runs parallel to the street. The gable overhangs the southern elevation of the building. There are two chimneys: a replica of a brick chimney at the northern end of the gable and a smaller brick chimney above the kitchen ell. The chimneys are comparatively large because they each serve multiple rooms in the house.

=== Interior ===
The house has a timber frame, like many American colonial houses of the same era. Its main section on North Square measures 30 by 48 feet (9.1 by 14.6 m) across, and the rear ell measures about 16 by 16 feet (4.9 by 4.9 m) across. By the late 20th century, four rooms were open to the public. Part of the first (ground) floor design replicated its appearance in the 17th century, during Howard's occupancy, while the rest of the house was furnished to the era of Revere's occupancy.

The interiors retain their original plasterwork, made from a mixture of ground oyster shells and cement. The Revere House's plaster ceilings are suspended from joists, one of the earliest examples of such a feature in the Massachusetts Bay Colony. The house also retains one of its original doors, which was painted to simulate wood graining; this door's design was replicated throughout the house. Reproduction details include 6-by-3-foot (1.83 by 0.91 m) doors each crafted out of a single piece of wood, with nail marks similar to those in other First Period houses. Wooden beams span the spaces, and the rooms have large fireplaces.

==== First floor ====
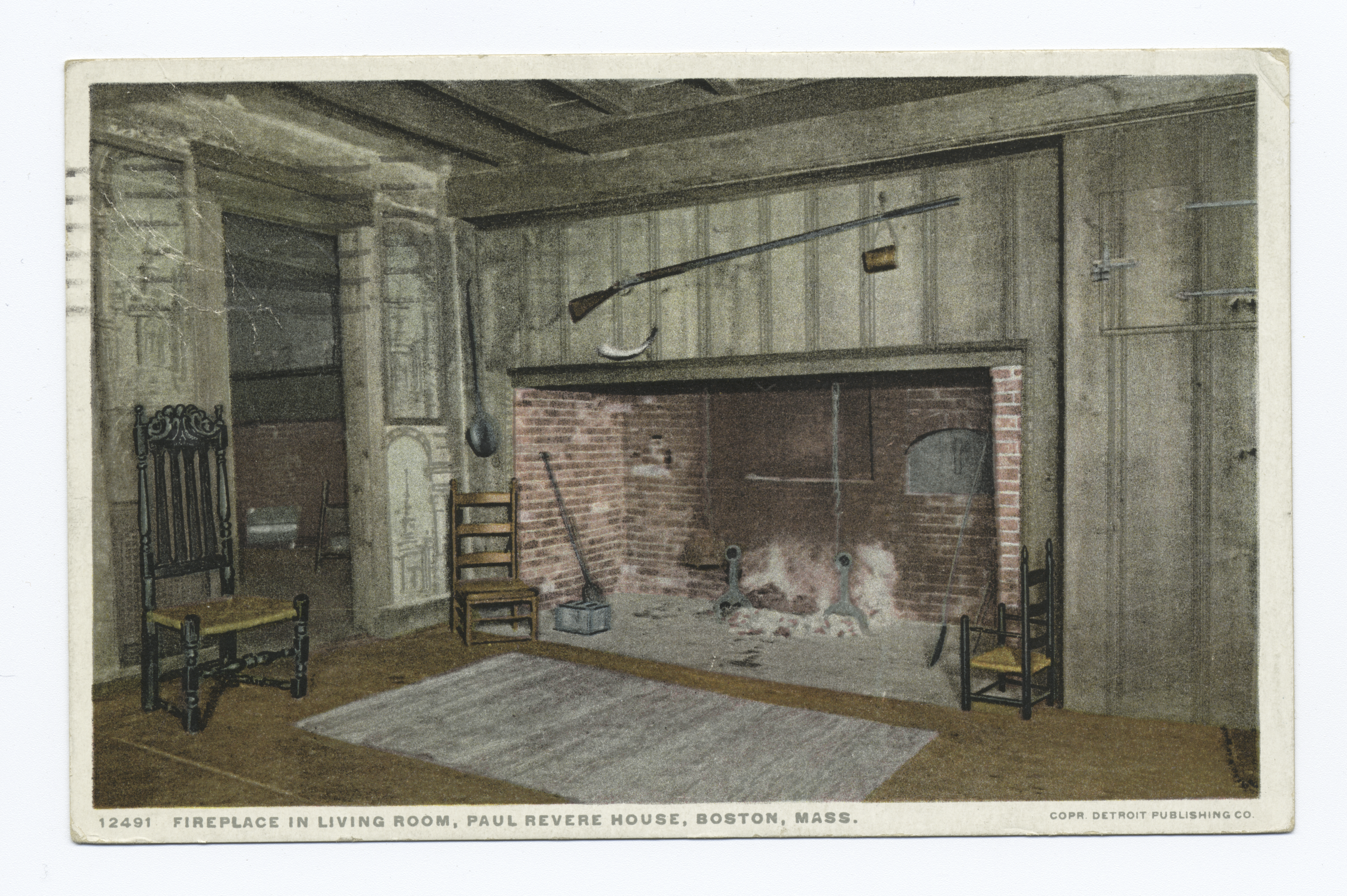
The living room fireplace

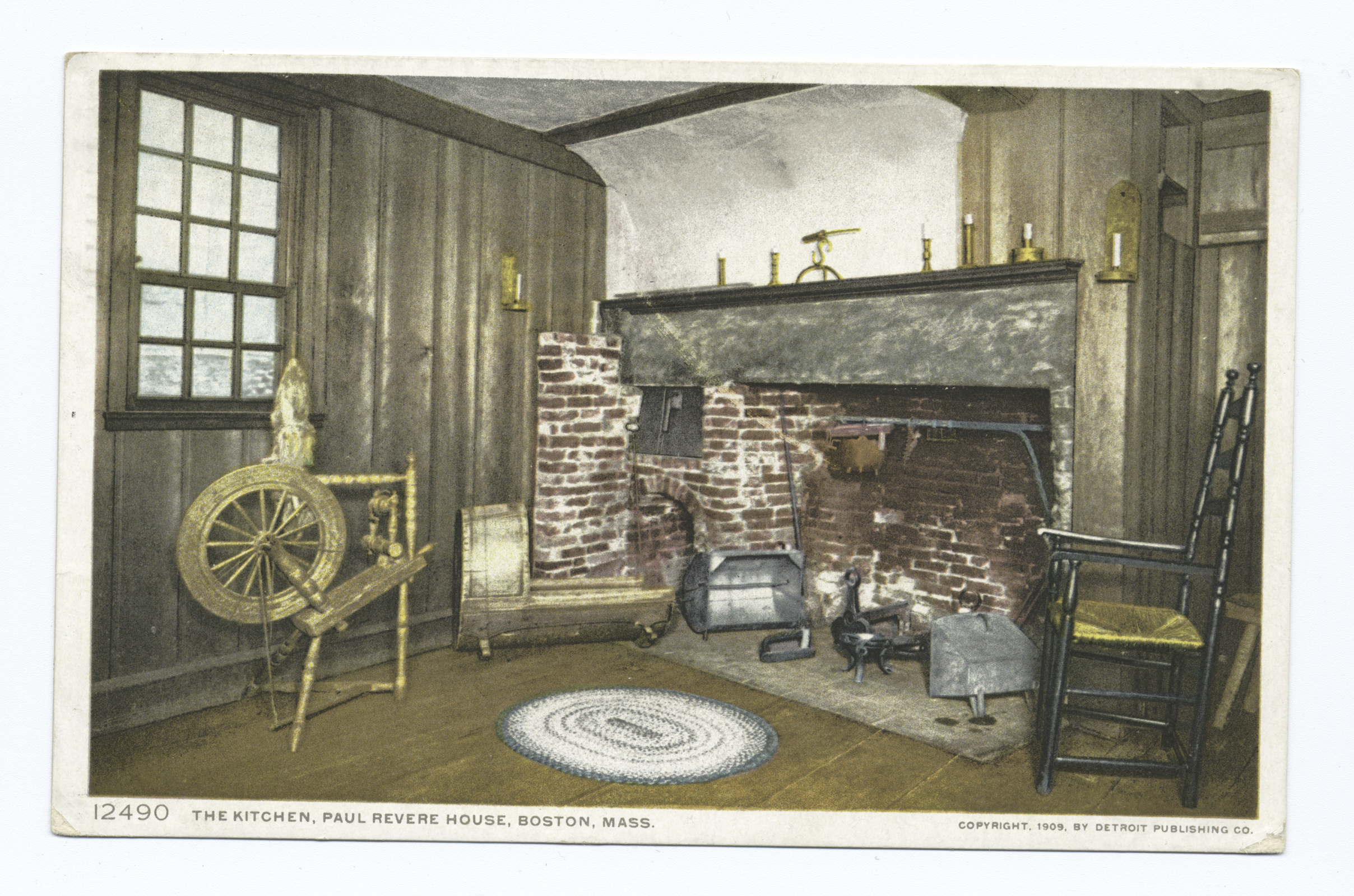
The kitchen

The first floor contains two rooms: the living room (also known as the hall) and the first-floor kitchen. This floor is accessed from a doorway at the northern end, which is at street level. The doorway leads to a foyer, which links with a living room on its left wall. To the right of the foyer is a set of stairs to the upper story, which has a steep slope. This stairway has wooden paneling. Both the hall and the kitchen have fireplaces. A 2004 study of the house's furnishings failed to find any documentation of how either the hall or the kitchen were furnished by any pre-1900s owners.

The hall is at the front (east) of the house. It also served as an office, workshop, or bedroom. The hall originally had a plaster ceiling and was formerly divided into multiple rooms. After the house became a museum, the hall had a wood-plank floor, plaster walls, oak posts, and exposed ceiling woodwork; three of the walls had wallpaper in the early 20th century. The north wall has a fireplace, with paneling similar to that at the Hart House in Ipswich, Massachusetts. Like other 17th-century one-room houses, the fireplace was deep, accommodating an oven. Although none of the original paneling remains in the house, some of this paneling survives at the Metropolitan Museum of Art (Met) in New York. One of the original windows survives on one wall; the inner face of the window frame has a molded plaster finish, which conceals wall studs in the window frame. The hall has been redecorated similarly to a well-off person's living–dining chamber. It has furniture from the 17th and early 18th centuries, such as a cupboard (on loan from the Met), carpet, and armchair. There are pieces of American and English furniture from before Revere's occupancy. The hall's fabrics, tablecloths, and carpets are reproductions of similar furnishings in 17th- and 18th-century houses.

The kitchen in the rear dates from c. 1790, when it was converted from a bedchamber or parlor. The kitchen has pine floors, glass dating from Chandler's renovation, and plastered and paneled walls. It has a fireplace on its northern wall, dating from the late 18th century. A doorway on the southern wall, originally leading to a two-story annex, is used as a visitor entrance. The kitchen is furnished similarly to those of Colonial and Federal houses from the 17th and 18th centuries. A passageway for visitors takes up about half of the kitchen. There are utensils and foodstuffs arranged around the room, including an oven, ketal, pots, metalware, and replicas of food. There are also pieces of furniture such as chairs, a table, and a cupboard.

==== Second floor ====
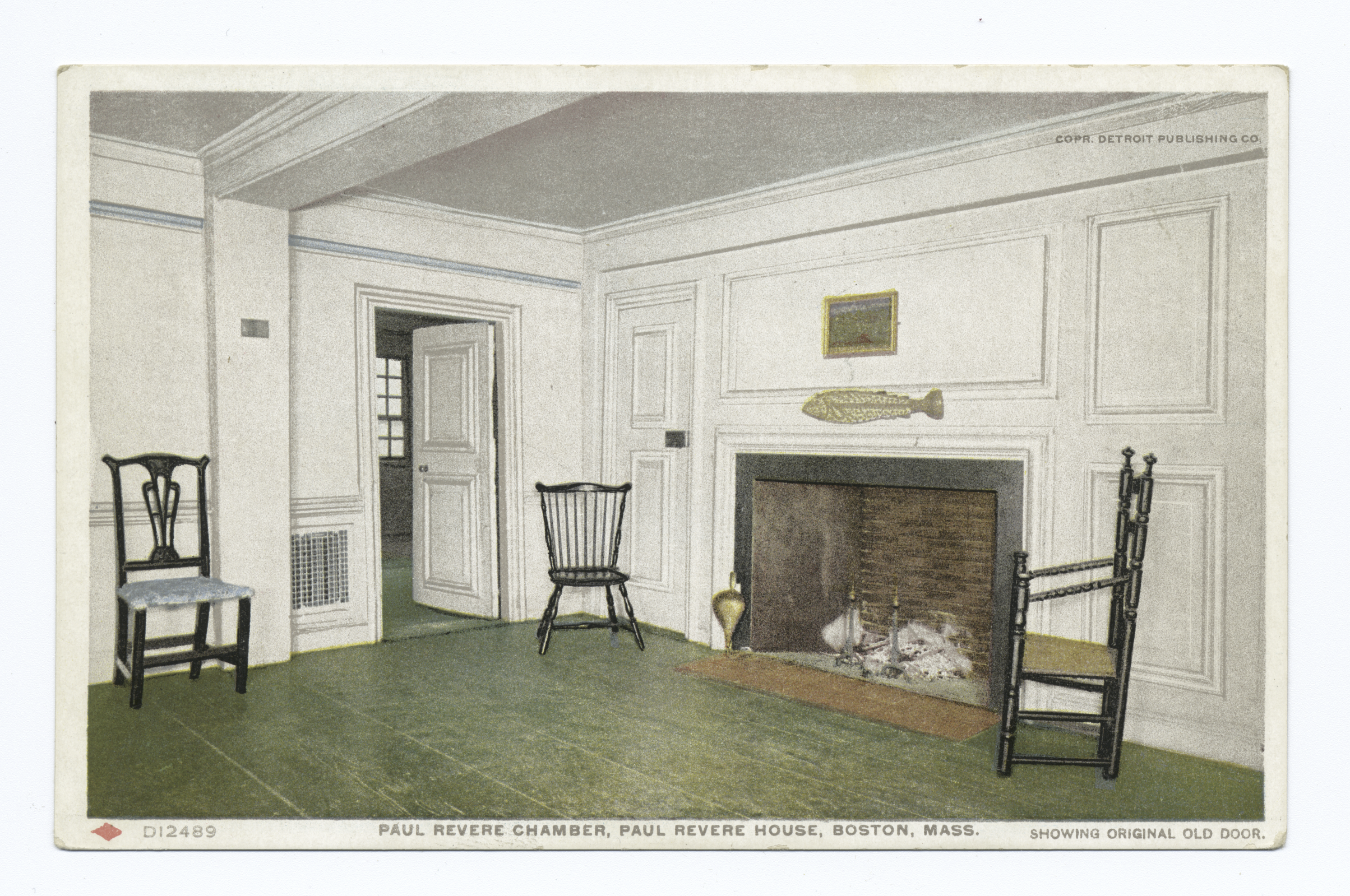
One of the bedchambers

The second floor has two bedrooms. The front bedroom, known as the best chamber, retains some original architectural features, including an original 1680s window frame and a wooden ceiling beam. The wooden floor is painted. The best chamber has a brick fireplace on the north wall, which is surrounded by wood paneling. The other three walls have wainscoting and plaster covered by wallpaper, and the ceiling is coated in plaster. There are windows on the west wall. Since it is unknown how Revere furnished the room, the furnishings are arranged similarly to typical master bedrooms in the 17th and 18th centuries. The design focuses on the room's presumed appearance in the 1790s, with a four-poster bed, a fireplace topped by a recessed shelf, and chests of drawers. Some pieces in the best chamber are known to be associated with the Revere family, including chairs, a sewing table, and one chest of drawers. Other pieces in the best chamber include a clock, bed, tables, washstand, chest, and mirrors. There are also replicas of period textiles.

The rear bedroom has wooden floors and wainscoted plaster walls. The room retains one of the original 1680s window frames on the west wall; two additional windows overlooking the south wall date from 1638. The north wall contains a fireplace, with a chimney that may date from Revere's occupancy. Next to the fireplace is a protruding wooden shaft that conceals HVAC ducts; there are additional HVAC grates in the ceiling and in a wooden box at one corner. Since it is unknown how Revere furnished the room, the PRMA decorated the rear bedroom in a simple manner, like other secondary bedrooms of the time. When the rear bedroom first opened to the public, it contained furnishings similar to those in 19th-century children's bedrooms, including a doll, small chair, and folding bed.

==== Other spaces ====
There was another kitchen in the cellar, which was used before the rear room was converted into a kitchen, and is closed to the public. The cellar is used for storage and is arranged into two rooms, similar to the stories above. There is a cement floor, lath and plaster finishes, pieces of the original foundation, and remnants of an entrance directly to a bulkhead under the sidewalk. The original fireplace was used for cooking and remains partially intact on the northern wall. The reconstructed chimney of the modern house is located near this fireplace.

The attic has two small rooms with sloped ceilings, each illuminated by minuscule windows. These rooms remained unrestored in the late 20th century and are closed to the public. Both rooms retain evidence of lath and plaster finishes, including on their northern wall, which retains its original brick and studs. The front attic room also has remnants of partitions, rafters, and wallpaper, while the rear attic room has a window and wallpaper.

== Operation ==
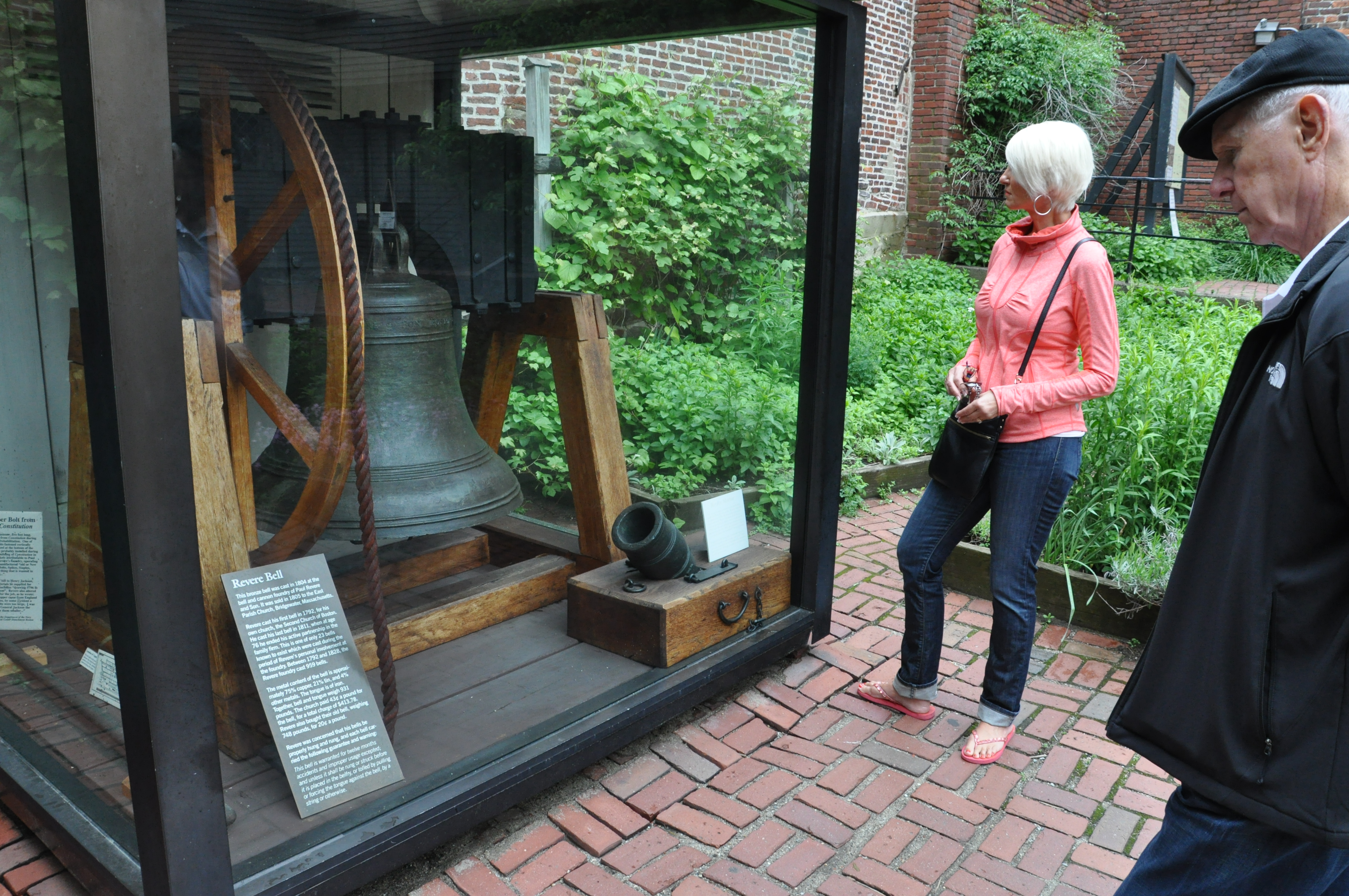
Revere bell in the courtyard

The Paul Revere Memorial Association operates both the Paul Revere House and the Pierce–Hichborn House as part of a single museum. The PRMA maintains the collection, hosts events and programs, and conducts and sponsors research into the house. Since 1986, its operation has been overseen by executive director Nina Zannieri. The house is open daily and charges an admission fee. Four rooms of the house are open to the public, viewable through self-guided tours. The museum hosts free-admission days for local students and families through the Boston Family Days program. The modern-day exhibits focus not only on the American Revolution but also other aspects of Revere's life and career, including his family. Reenactments of Revere's midnight ride originate from the house every April.

The modern museum's collection consists of the objects and furnishings in the Revere House, along with the house itself. When the museum opened in 1908, the interiors were restored to their appearance in Revere's day. Objects on display included some of the Reveres' personal belongings, along with period furniture from the 17th and 18th centuries. There were also a reproduced architectural drawing, a shingle cutter from Revere's time as a carpenter, and written correspondence and newspaper clippings from Revere's time. Additional furnishings were acquired in the mid-20th century, including two Colonial rugs.

In the latter half of the 20th century, writers described the collection as including Revere's spectacles, along with objects such as dishes, muskets, bedposts, silverware, and bed warmers. The collection had furnishings evocative of Revere's time, along with some of Revere's personal belongings and older 17th-century decorations. One source from 1990 described the house as having 750 objects, of which three-fifths were on display. The Revere House's collection also includes examples of metalwork that he manufactured, such as silverware, which are regularly rotated in and out of storage. By 2014, the collection had 2,000 items, such as papers and silver objects.

== Impact and legacy ==
=== Reception ===
A writer in the 1880s stated that "it is fortunate that, amid all the changes that have taken place in North Square, this interesting house [...] has been spared to us". Another commentator during the 1890s said the house was a "priceless bit of embodied history", which could be easily distinguished by its overhanging second floor. The Milton Record wrote in 1905 that the building was "a quaint, dirty, dilapidated wooden building with queer chimneys and overhanging upper story", while another source the same year described the house as "a quaint example of prerevolutionary architecture".

After the museum opened, Outlook magazine wrote that the artifacts "have been surprising in their interest and antiquity", and The Youth's Companion wrote that the house was "a quaint and charming bit of real old Boston, in the midst of the babel of the foreign quarter". Fruit, Garden and Home magazine called it "an outpost of a departed day" and said that, despite the house's small size, the objects and decorations created an impression of sturdiness. The Boston Evening Transcript wrote that Chandler had "manage[d] to create an 'atmosphere'" and that the furnishings were arranged as though the occupants had just departed in a hurry. A writer for Country Life magazine praised Chandler's renovation of the buildings as skillfully blending designs from the 17th and 18th centuries, though later architectural observers criticized it as anachronistic. In the mid-20th century, one writer said the building "has an interest for the visitor in itself", separate from the collections, and another observer said the house was "handsomely furnished" despite its diminutive appearance. By contrast, in 1964 The Holyoke Daily Transcript and the Holyoke Telegram described the house as "a letdown for the tourist".

Sources in the late 20th and early 21st century continued to describe the house as cozy. The Boston Globe in 1990 wrote that the house appeared "downright medieval by contemporary standards" but, along with the Pierce–Hichborn House, held much interest for visitors. A writer for The New York Times said in 1993 that because of its smaller size and old furnishings, the Revere House "has the appealing, musty tranquillity of an antique country home left intact while the city grew around it"; in the same year, The Salt Lake Tribune described the interiors as "dim but cozy". Seth Margolis of the Times wrote in 1999 that the building's continued survival seemed miraculous despite the density of the nearby tenements, and Susan Wilson wrote in 2004 that the building "is an odd sight amid the tall brick buildings of the North End". Another commentator, in 2001, characterized the house as a tourist trap that nonetheless provided insight into colonial American living.

=== Landmark designations, media, and replicas ===
The Boston National Historic Sites Commission first proposed designating the Paul Revere House, along with neighboring sections of North Square, as part of a national park in 1961. The Paul Revere House was designated a National Historic Landmark (NHL) in 1961, and it was added to the National Register of Historic Places in 1966. The neighboring Pierce–Hichborn House is also listed as a NHL in its own right. The Paul Revere House is one of eight sites in the 43-acre (17 ha) Boston National Historical Park, which was designated in 1974. Paul Revere Jr., the PRMA's president of the time, had opposed the national park designation in the belief that it would have required the demolition of nearby buildings. Inclusion in the national park allowed the Revere House to receive funding from the National Park Service.

The wallpaper discovered in the 1900s renovation has been replicated, and pieces of the house's original furniture were moved to the Chicago Historical Society c. 1933 and exhibited there. A replica of the house was also exhibited at the Century of Progress in Chicago during 1933. The house's design also inspired a restaurant in Cleveland, Ohio, built in 1936 with the assistance of the Paul Revere Association of Boston. Cut-and-assemble models of the house have also been sold.

== See also ==
- List of the oldest buildings in Massachusetts
- List of National Historic Landmarks in Boston
- National Register of Historic Places listings in northern Boston

Preceded by Faneuil Hall	Locations along Boston's; Freedom Trail; Paul Revere House	Succeeded by Old North Church
