= Pierce–Hichborn House =

Historic house in Boston, Massachusetts

- U.S. National Register of Historic Places
- U.S. National Historic Landmark
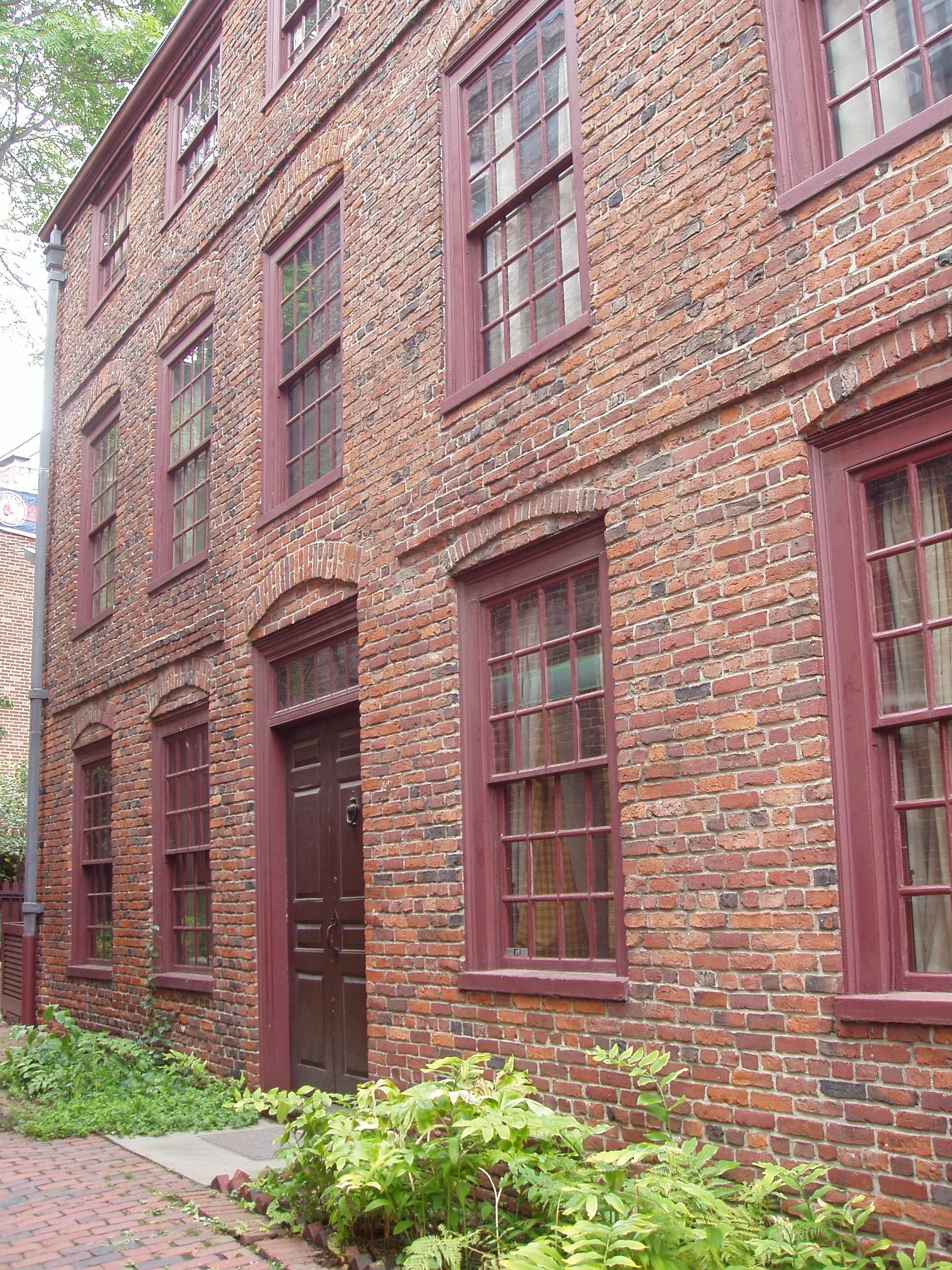
- Pierce–Hichborn House from the front

- Location within Boston Location within Massachusetts Location within the United States
- Interactive map of Pierce–Hichborn House
- Location: 29 North Square; Boston, Massachusetts, US
- Coordinates: 42°21′49″N 71°03′14″W
- Built: 1711
- Built by: Moses Pierce
- Architectural style: Georgian
- NRHP reference No.: 68000042

Significant dates
- Added to NRHP: November 24, 1968
- Designated NHL: November 24, 1968

The Pierce–Hichborn House is an early Georgian house located at 29 North Square in Boston, Massachusetts, United States. Built c. 1711, it is adjacent to the Paul Revere House and is operated as a nonprofit museum by the Paul Revere Memorial Association. The house is a National Historic Landmark and is listed on the National Register of Historic Places.

The Pierce–Hichborn House is three stories tall, faced in brick with decorative belt courses, large sash windows, and a shallow hip roof. Its narrow street-facing elevation faces east, with its main facade opening to the south. Inside it is laid out on each floor as a narrow central hallway and stairway with a single heated room to either side. Framing is oak and the trim is pine, including fireplace mantels. Each room originally had two front-facing windows and two side windows. The house has an irregular lot line facing North Square, creating rooms with oblique angles.

The house was built by glazier Moses Pierce, the grandson of John Jeffs, who had owned the site. William Shippard purchased the house in 1747. Nathaniel Hichborn, a boatbuilder and cousin of Paul Revere, acquired the house from Shippard in 1781. The Hichborn family lived in the house until 1864, and it became a tenement and store until the early 1940s. The house was acquired for museum use in 1950. The Paul Revere Memorial Association took over ownership in 1970 and continues to operate the house as a museum.

== Site ==
The Pierce–Hichborn House is located at 29 North Square in the North End neighborhood of Boston in Massachusetts, at the western end of North Street. Situated on Shawmut Peninsula, the Pierce–Hichborn House occupies a landmass that existed prior to the peninsula's expansion via land reclamation. The site was originally about 150 feet (46 m) from the waterfront, but land reclamation has since pushed the shoreline to about 800 feet (240 m) from the house.

The Pierce–Hichborn House is on the northwest side of North Square. The land lot includes the Paul Revere House immediately to the north, the Pierce–Hichborn House, and a courtyard between the two buildings (originally the John Barnard House). This courtyard is paved in brick with some small plots of greenery, and has a pump and trough. A third house once existed between the Revere and Pierce–Hichborn houses, but was later replaced by a tenement, which itself was demolished.

== Architecture ==
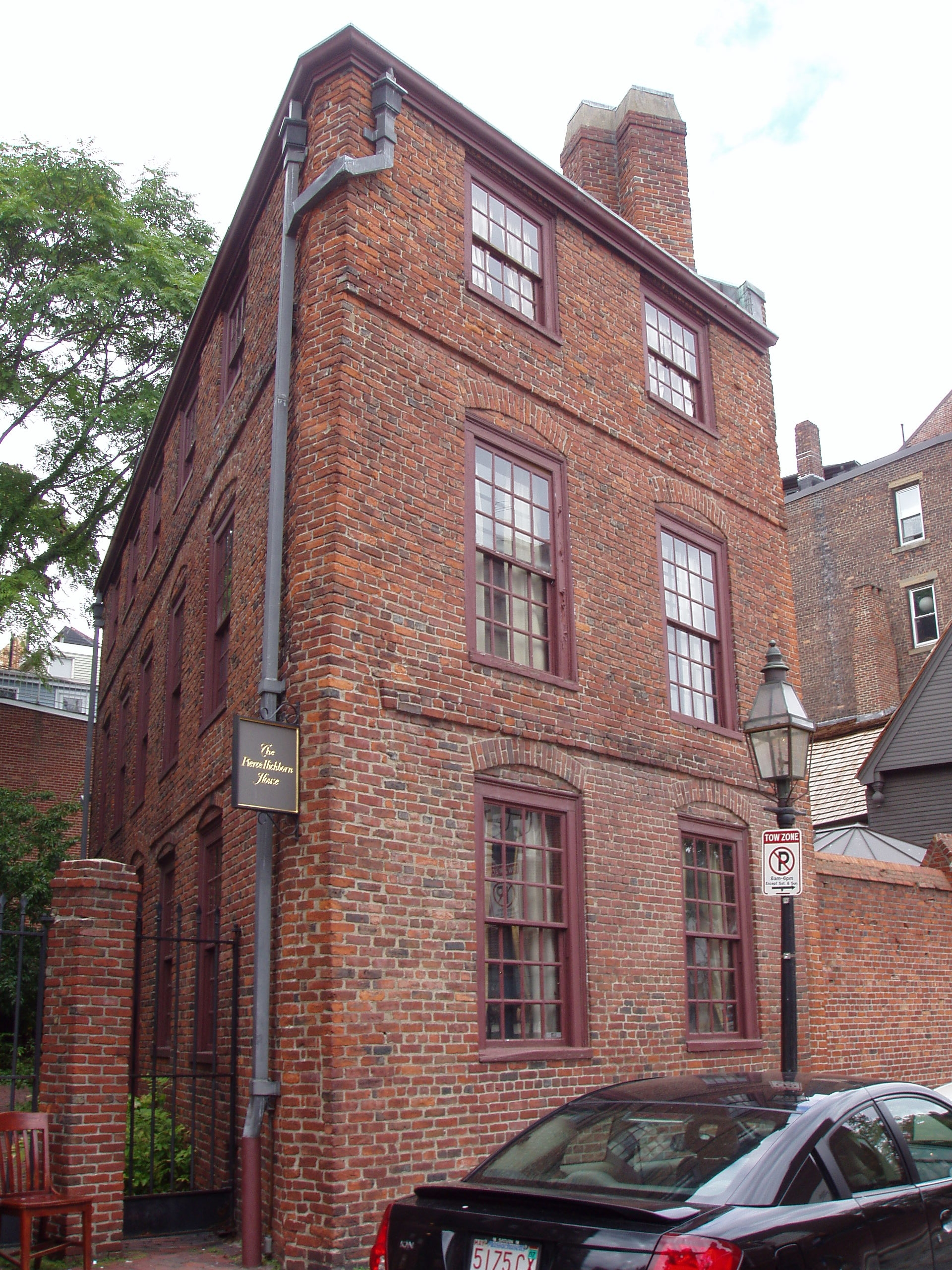
A view of the Pierce–Hichborn House from the street

The Pierce–Hichborn House is three stories tall and is designed in the Georgian style. It is an example of an American vernacular building with British design influences. The Pierce–Hichborn House is one of the oldest remaining brick houses in Boston and an early example of the brick construction that came to predominate the area following the 1676 Boston fire. It is also the oldest known building in Boston with a hip roof. The design lacks features commonplace to the area's 17th-century houses, such as wood-paneled walls and casement windows with rhombus panes. In contrast to the neighboring Revere House (whose design was inspired by New England's 17th-century wood-frame structures), the Pierce–Hichborn House's design took greater inspiration from 18th-century artisans' and merchants' houses in England.

=== Facade ===
The foundation of the Pierce–Hichborn House is an aggregate of cement, fieldstone, and brick. The stories above are clad in brick laid in common bond. The house is composed of a main section with an ell. The street-facing elevation of the facade, to the east, is two bays wide; this elevation runs diagonally to the other elevations because of the irregular dimensions of the site. The south elevation is five bays wide and faces a small yard, which may have originally functioned as a passageway running through the block. The center bay of the first floor has an entrance with a double wooden door, a lintel, and transom windows. The original occupant, a glazier named Moses Pierce, may have placed the entrance on the side elevation to show off the windows his business produced, while also providing privacy. The house's orientation also allowed it to receive sunlight from the east during the morning.

The main section's first through third floors generally have sash windows with wooden windowsills; the first- and second-floor windows have brick lintels. The bricks above each window are laid in an arch pattern. For the most part, there are belt courses running horizontally across the facade on the first and second floors. The north elevation lacks these belt courses and has only a single third-floor window opening and two conjoined chimneys. There is a hip roof from which the chimneys protrude; the roof itself cannot be seen from the street because it is so shallow. The presence of the paired chimneys contrasts with other houses of the time, which typically had one chimney in the center. A Christian Science Monitor article from 1912 described the chimneys and belt courses as prominent features of the design.

Next to the main house is the ell, which is two stories high and accommodates a kitchen. This ell has a wood doorway on its southern elevation, with a wood-framed window. The other windows in the ell have brick windowsills and lintels, and are double-hung. A wood-framed annex extends west of the ell and measures one bay wide on all sides. This annex is two stories high and has a gable roof.

=== Interior ===
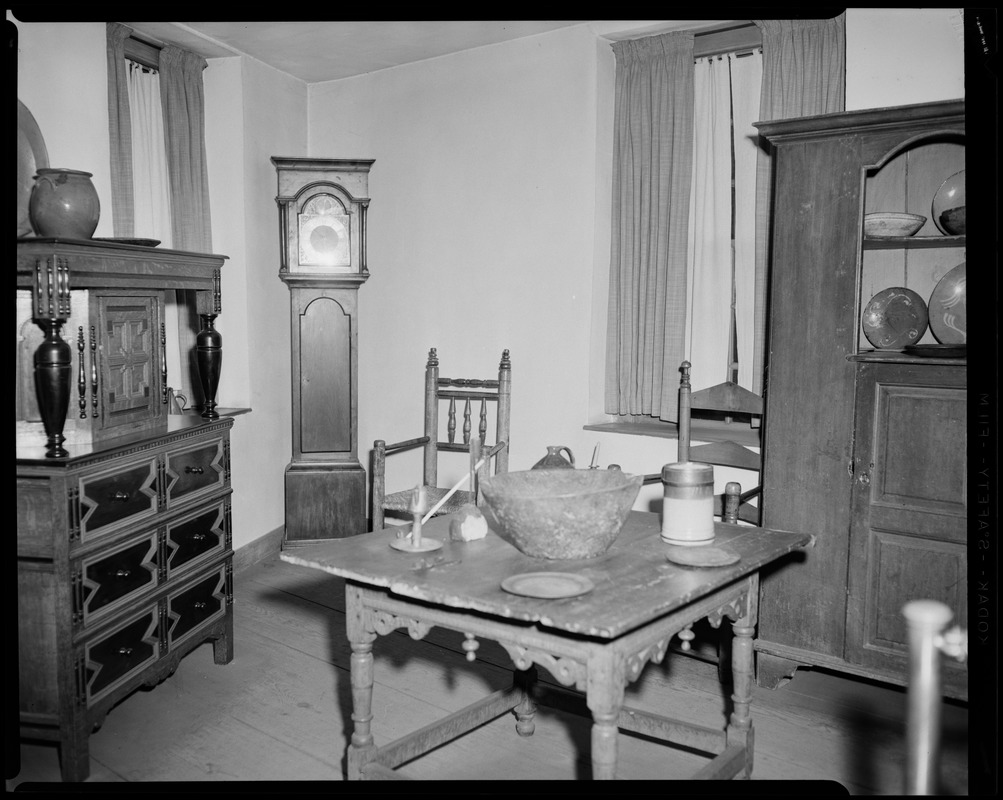
Interior of one room

The original house has six rooms, each of which has a fireplace. Since the decorations were constructed by carpenters who typically worked on ships, some of the decorative details, such as closet doors and moldings, are slanted. The entrance leads to a first-story stair hall, with a staircase ascending to the second floor and doorways leading west and east. The staircase has a U-shaped plan and wainscoting, along with decorations such as drops and turned balusters. Both the western and eastern first-floor rooms have floors made of wide wood planks; walls and ceilings made of painted plaster; and fireplaces on their north walls, decorated with plaster. The fireplace in the western room is shallow and has closets on both sides, while the eastern room's fireplace is larger and adjoins a closet on one side only. The eastern room is trapezoidal because of the irregular eastern lot line.

The second and third floors have a similar layout to the first floor, with rectangular western and trapezoidal eastern rooms flanking a central stair hall that is oriented north–south. Both the western and eastern second-floor rooms have floors made of wide wood planks; walls and ceilings made of painted plaster; and fireplaces on their north walls. The eastern second-floor room has an ornate fireplace mantel and painted exposed ceiling beams, both of which retain some of their previous black decorations. There are closets east of the eastern second-floor room's fireplace, and on both sides of the western second-floor room's fireplace. The eastern second-floor bedroom functioned as a parlor overlooking the sea. The third floor has lower ceilings; the eastern third-floor room has a wooden beam emanating from one of the building's corners. The children slept on this story.

The ell has another staircase, reached by an entrance hall from the west. On the first floor, the ell has a kitchen with wide wood planks, along with walls and ceilings made of drywall and painted plaster. The kitchen has a fireplace on its western wall, topped by wooden cabinets, and there are additional cabinets on two other walls.

== History ==
Prior to the construction of the Pierce–Hichborn House, the site was occupied by John Jeffs's house. A structure occupied the front portion of Jeffs's site by 1676, and the Jeffs house burned that year. By 1678, a court had ordered Jeffs's estate to be split off. The land came to be owned by Jeffs's daughter Mary Pierce, who in 1701 requested that a wooden home be built on the site.

=== Residential use ===
Mary transferred the property to her son Moses in 1710, at which point the site contained a number of stores. Moses was a glazier, whose business had been housed in one of the preexisting buildings on the site. Moses had the existing buildings on the site demolished and replaced with a brick house in 1711. The house may have been built by the mason Ebenezer Clough. It was one of several brick residences being built in Boston at the time, at a time when much of the area's buildings were still made of timber. Pierce's house was similar to those of other well-off artisans who lived in Boston in the 18th century. Even then, the neighborhood was urban, and the house stood just down the square from the Revere House. Pierce sold the house in 1747 to William Shippard, who is listed as a mariner. By then, there were multiple structures on the lot, possibly at the front of the site.

Nathaniel Hichborn, a boatbuilder and cousin of Paul Revere (who lived down the block), acquired the house from Shippard in 1781. At the time, a "dwelling house" (possibly the Moses Pierce House) was the only remaining structure listed as occupying the lot. Hichborn moved in with his family and lived there for the rest of his life, dying in 1797. After Hichborn's death, the two-story ell west of the house was built around 1805. A brick building was added on the lot's western extremity at some point between 1843 and 1852. Also in the mid-19th century, storefronts were built along the house's southern elevation. The Hichborn family ultimately used the house for eight decades, eventually selling it in 1864.

The house became a tenement and store until the early 1940s and variously functioned as the residence of Irish, Jewish, and Polish immigrants. By the late 19th century, the North End was predominated by Italians, a demographic that likely lived in the Pierce–Hichborn House during that time. In 1903, a fire began in a grocery store in the basement and spread through the house, requiring its 20 occupants to evacuate. At some point before World War II, there was a barber shop in the house. At the time, the house was divided into four tenement units. The Sumner Tunnel was built directly under the house in the early 1930s. The Society for the Preservation of New England Antiquities bought the house at a bank auction in 1941, and by the late 1940s, the building had become a gambling den. The house's residents included Portuguese and Italians who did not know about its history. The Boston Police Department raided the house in 1948 following a tip that bookmakers were illicitly using the house for bets and money drop-offs. The raid spurred preservation efforts for the house.

=== Preservation and museum use ===
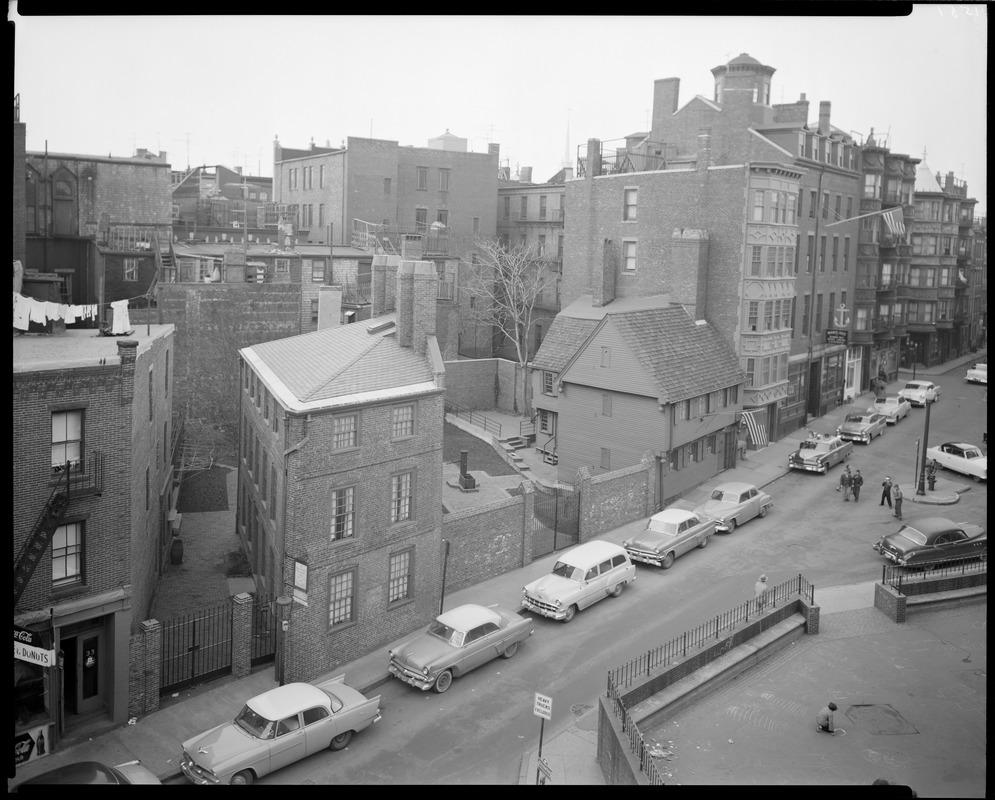
Pierce–Hichborn House (left) and Paul Revere House (right) as seen in 1956

In 1949, descendants of Hichborn led an effort to restore the house, and a stair was added. That year, the Moses Pierce Williams House Association was established in December to take over the house's operation. Charles R. Strickland oversaw the renovation, and the Pierce–Hichborn House was opened to the public in 1950. Four of the rooms were opened to the public, with period furniture on exhibit. Some of the furniture was loaned from museums in Boston and New York, and a chair reportedly used by Paul Revere was displayed. There were also pottery samples and a four-poster bed. Morton Crehore, the house's caretaker, lived there with his wife and gave tours to visitors. The house went through about a half-dozen caretakers over the next two decades. During the 1950s, the city's Public Improvement Commission proposed tearing down 116 nearby tenements in an attempt to attract visitors to the Paul Revere and Pierce–Hichborn houses. At the time, the houses were difficult to access due to the narrow street grid. Had the plan been carried out, there would have been a park and driveway surrounding the Revere and Pierce–Hichborn houses.

The Boston Historic Sites Commission, a federal organization tasked with saving sites in Boston, contemplated formally preserving the Pierce–Hichborn House in the late 1950s. The commission hired a local architect to draw sketches of the building. By the 1960s, visitors frequently confused the Revere and Pierce–Hichborn houses, which at the time functioned as separate museums. Only the Revere House was designated as part of the Freedom Trail and, thus, was sought out by more visitors. The caretaker at the time, Charles Coombs, said that tourists and even locals misidentified the Pierce–Hichborn House as the Revere House. When the Revere House was closed on Sundays, prospective visitors often toured the Pierce–Hichborn House instead; at the time, the Pierce–Hichborn House was open every day except Mondays. The house was named a National Historic Landmark by the National Park Service on November 24, 1968, and was also listed on the National Register of Historic Places. By then, James F. Armstrong was the house's caretaker. He and his family lived in four of the rooms on the second and third floors rent-free; Armstrong gave tours of the other four rooms from May to October.

The Paul Revere Memorial Association (PRMA) took over ownership in 1970. which began operating the house as a museum in conjunction with the Revere House. The Pierce–Hichborn House was initially closed except for special events, and the PRMA conducted some repairs early that decade. The house underwent more comprehensive renovations in the early 1980s; by then, the foundation had been weakened, the interior paint was fading, and the exterior was crumbling. None of the original furniture remained intact. The house was opened to the public in 1982, while renovations were underway. Afterward, it was open for guided tours twice a day. By the 1990s, the Pierce–Hichborn House had an education center and staff offices.

The house continued to be used as staff offices into the 21st century, at which point it was typically open only through guided tours. In 2017, archeologists also began studying the Revere House's old outdoor privy (next to the Pierce–Hichborn House); they found objects such as pottery shards, Italian glass, a clasp, and animal bones.

== See also ==
- List of National Historic Landmarks in Boston
- National Register of Historic Places listings in northern Boston, Massachusetts
