= Mariners House =

Building in Boston, Massachusetts

- Mariner's House
- U.S. National Register of Historic Places
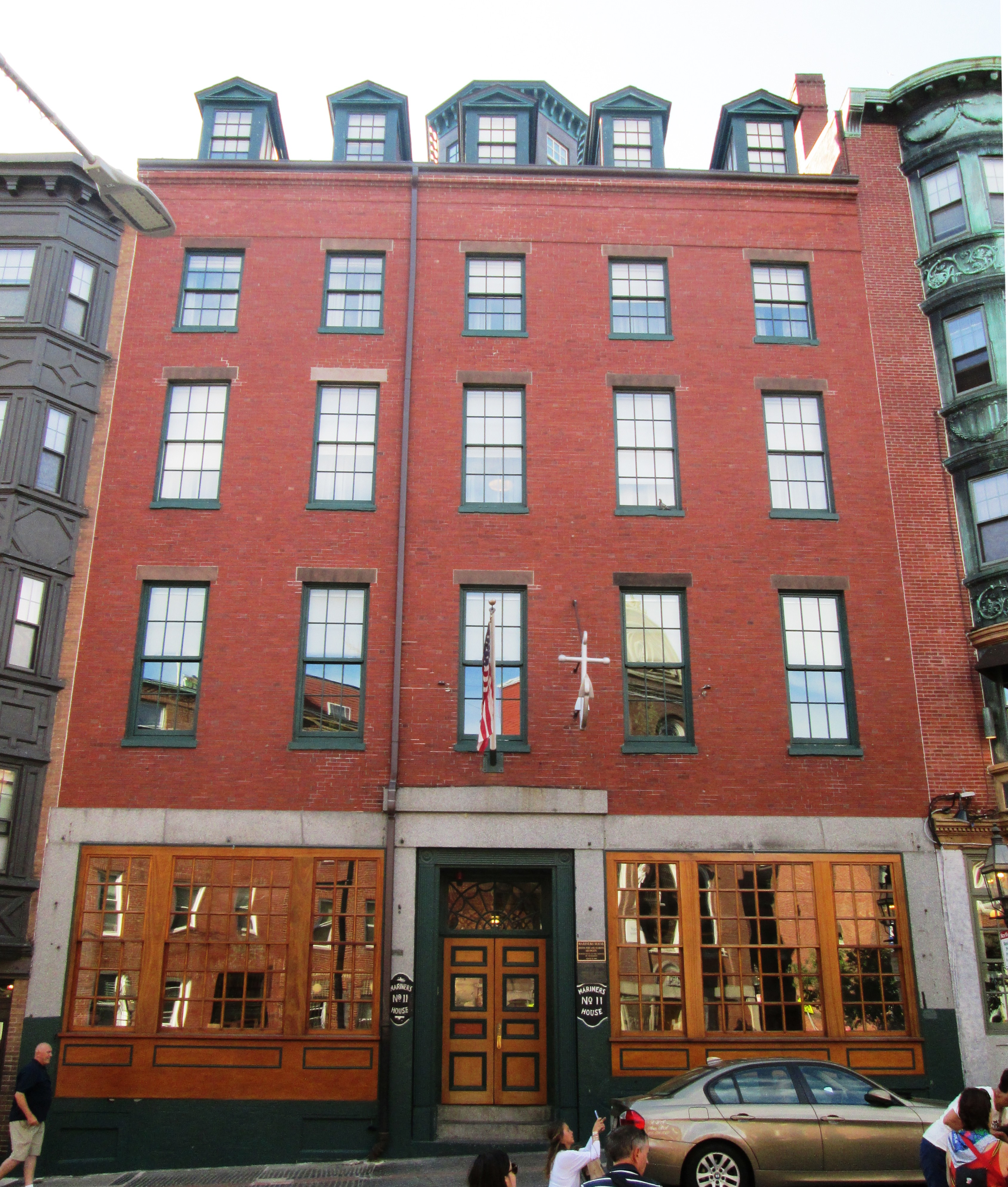
- Mariner's House in 2017
- Location: 11 North Square, Boston, Massachusetts, U.S.
- Coordinates: 42°21′50″N 71°3′13″W
- Built: 1847
- Architectural style: Greek Revival
- NRHP reference No.: 99001302
- Added to NRHP: November 12, 1999

The Mariner's House is a historic hotel at 11 North Square in Boston, Massachusetts.

== History ==
The building was constructed in 1847 by the Boston Port Society and operated as a boarding house for sailors by the Boston Seaman's Aid Society and the Port Society's chaplain, Father Edward Thompson Taylor.

The building was described in the 1850s:

This is a noble edifice of 4 stories, erected by the Boston Port Society, and leased to the Seamans' Aid Society : it contains 40 rooms over the basement story : the building is 40 feet square, with a wing extending 70 feet of three stories; in the basement is a storage room for seamens' luggage, kitchen; laundry and bathing room: in the wing, is a spacious dining hall for seating an hundred persons ': it has a chapel for morning and evening services arid where social, religious meetings are held every Wednesday evening under the care of Rev. E. T. Taylor : a reading and news room, with a good library to which accessions are daily making; and a store for the sale of sailors' clothing: the building and land cost about $38,000, and it has been furnished at a cost of about $21,000, by the generous contributions of the Unitarian Churches of Boston and vicinity; a good supply of water is on the estate, and two force pumps supply each of the stories with hot or cold water, as required.

The hotel was built in the Greek Revival style and added to the National Register of Historic Places in 1999. In that same year, the house was rededicated "to the service of seafarers" by the Boston Port and Seaman's Aid Society; the two organizations merged in 1867.

== Current use ==
Mariner's House now maintains the role of an inexpensive hotel for merchant mariners on active duty. It offers short-term accommodations (maximum stay 13 days), including breakfast, to guests who can prove that they are actively working in the merchant marine.

== See also ==
- National Register of Historic Places listings in northern Boston, Massachusetts
- Sarah Josepha Hale, founder of the Seaman's Aid Society
