= Freedom Trail =

Path linking historic sites in Boston

Coordinates: 42°21′36″N 71°3′24″W

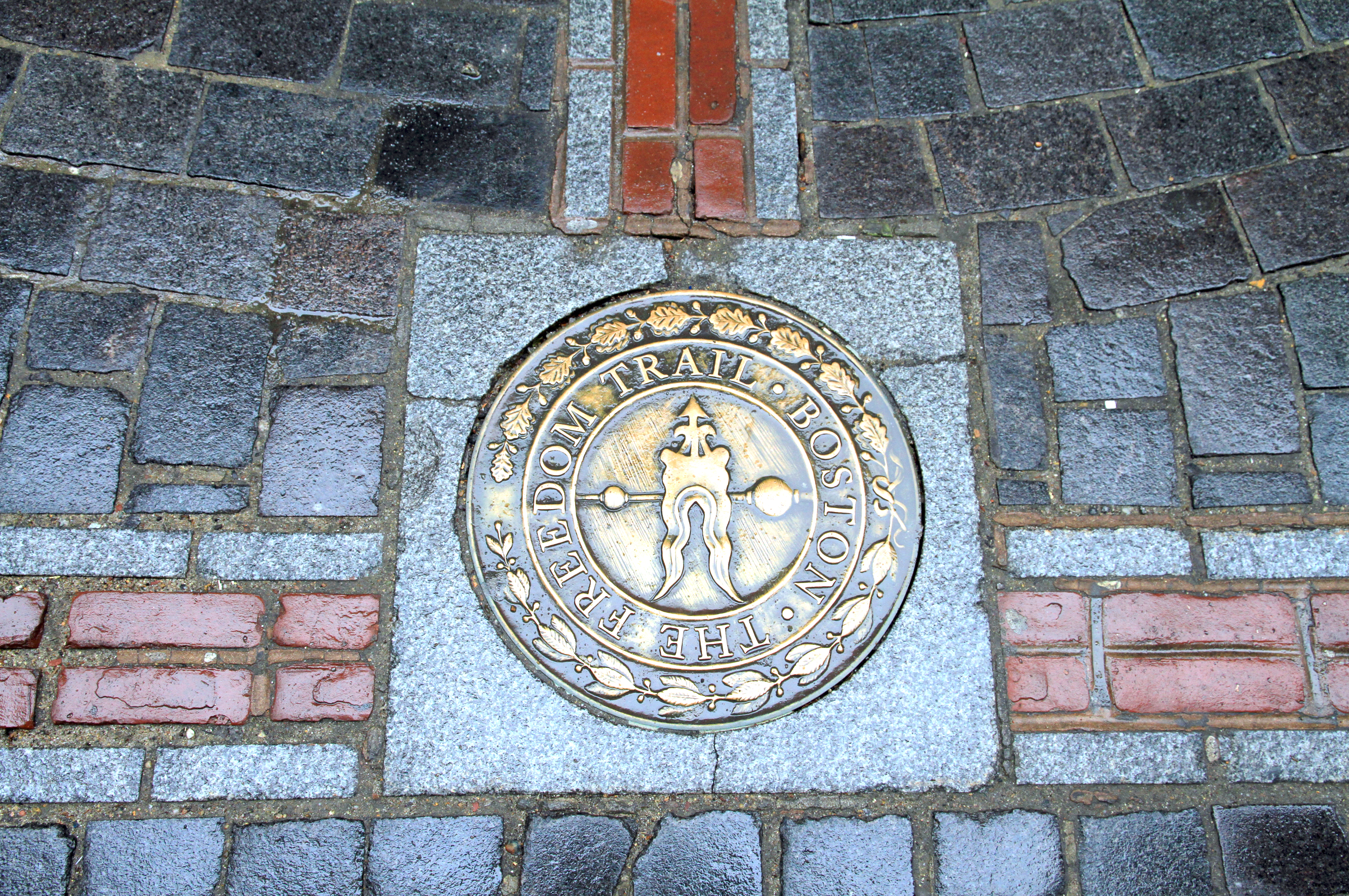
- Special markers implanted in the sidewalk denote the stops along the Freedom Trail
- Length: 2.5 mi (4.0 km)
- Location: Boston, Massachusetts
- Established: 1951
- Designation: National Millennium Trail
- Trailheads: Boston Common to Bunker Hill Monument in Charlestown
- Use: Walking, History
- Difficulty: Easy
- Sights: 16 historical sites
- Surface: Bricks
- Website: www.thefreedomtrail.org

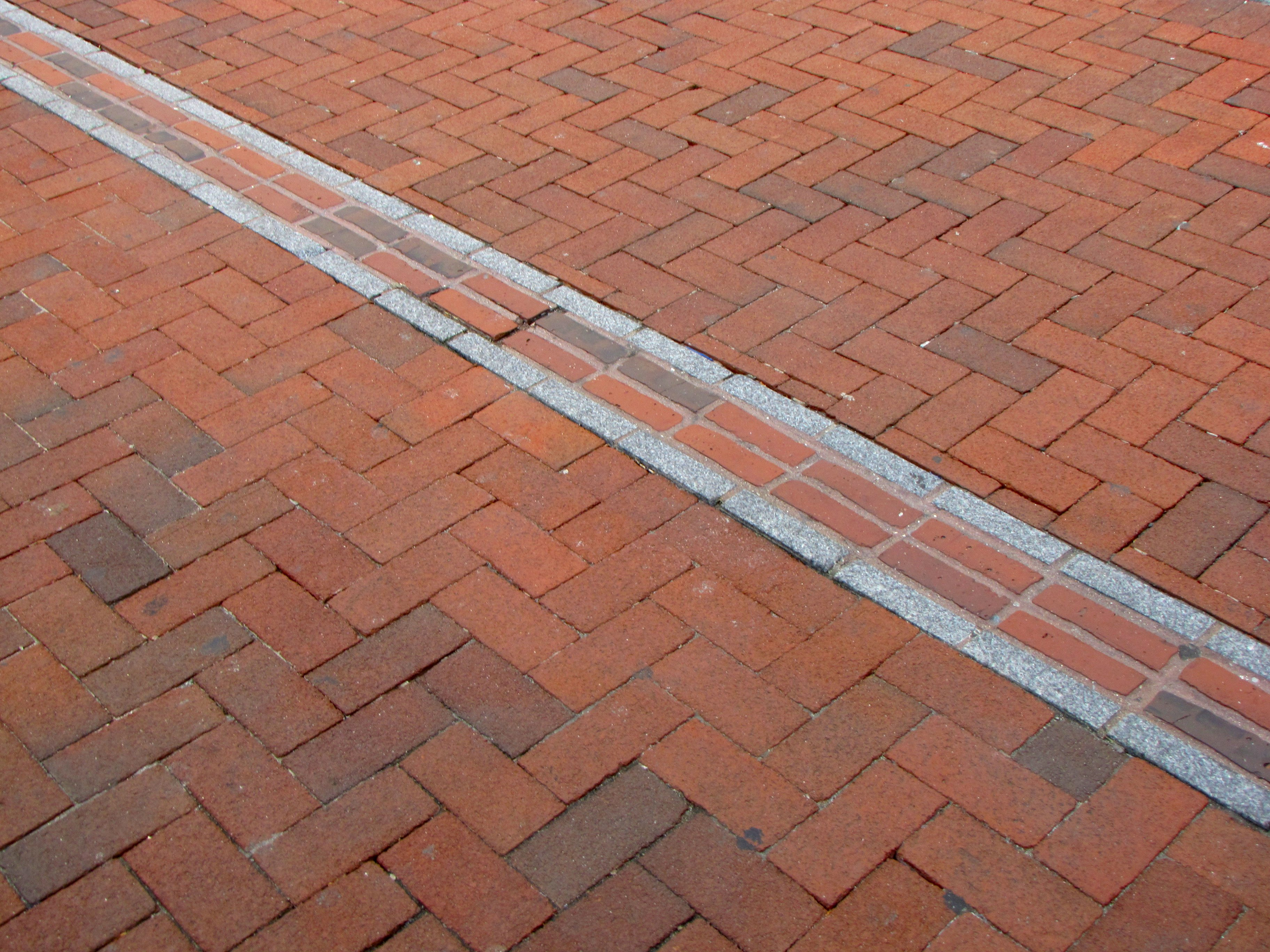
Freedom Trail marker through a red brick sidewalk

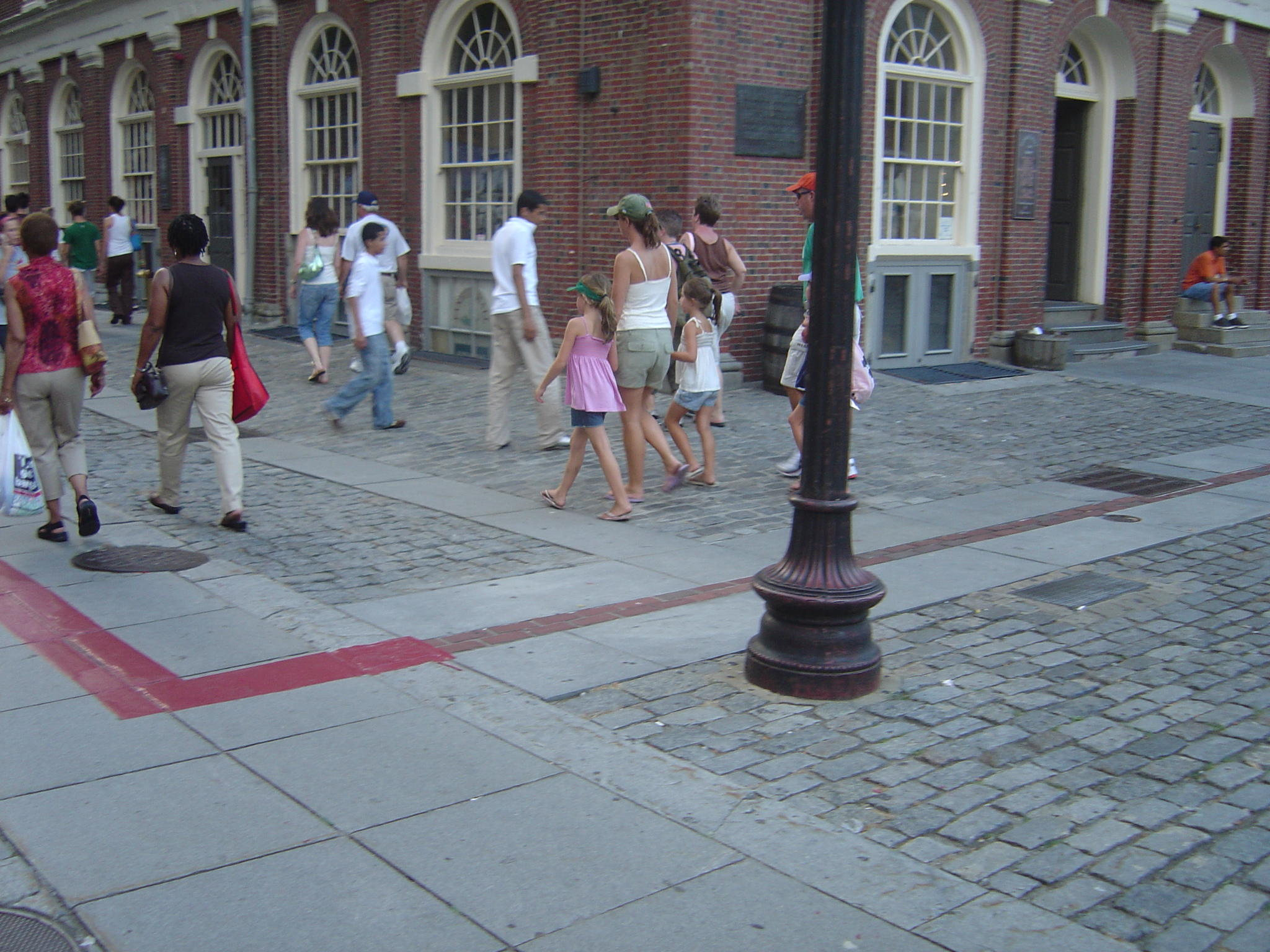
Freedom Trail next to Faneuil Hall

The Freedom Trail is a 2.5-mile-long (4.0 km) path through Boston, Massachusetts, that passes by 16 locations significant to the history of the United States. It winds from Boston Common in downtown Boston to the Old North Church in the North End and the Bunker Hill Monument in Charlestown. Stops along the trail include simple explanatory ground markers, graveyards, notable churches and buildings, and a historic naval frigate. Most of the sites are free or suggest donations, although the Old South Meeting House, the Old State House, and the Paul Revere House charge admission. The Freedom Trail is overseen by the City of Boston's Freedom Trail Commission and is supported in part by grants from various non-profit organizations and foundations, private philanthropy, and Boston National Historical Park.

The Freedom Trail was conceived by journalist William Schofield in 1951, who suggested building a pedestrian trail to link important landmarks. Boston mayor John Hynes decided to put Schofield's idea into action. By 1953, 40,000 people were walking the trail annually. In 2026, an augmented reality tour called Relive 1776 was introduced along the Freedom Trail.

The National Park Service operates a visitor center on the first floor of Faneuil Hall, where they offer tours, provide free maps of the Freedom Trail and other historic sites, and sell books about Boston and United States history.

Some observers have noted the tendency of the Freedom Trail's narrative frame to omit certain historical locations, such as the sites of the Boston Tea Party and the Liberty Tree.

== Official trail sites ==
The official trail sites are (generally from south-to-north):

1. Boston Common
2. Massachusetts State House
3. Park Street Church
4. Granary Burying Ground
5. King's Chapel and King's Chapel Burying Ground
6. Boston Latin School Site/Statue of Benjamin Franklin
7. Old Corner Bookstore
8. Old South Meeting House
9. Old State House
10. Boston Massacre Site
11. Faneuil Hall
12. Paul Revere House
13. Old North Church
14. Copp's Hill Burying Ground
15. USS Constitution
16. Bunker Hill Monument

Notes: The Black Heritage Trail crosses the Freedom Trail between the Massachusetts State House and Park Street Church. The Boston Irish Famine Memorial is also located along the Freedom Trail, between the Old Corner Bookstore and the Old South Meeting House. The New England Holocaust Memorial is located a few steps off the Freedom Trail, just north of Faneuil Hall.

== In popular culture ==
The Freedom Trail is a significant plot point in the 2015 video game Fallout 4, helping the player to find the headquarters of the Railroad (one of the major factions) in the crypt of the Old North Church.
