= History of Italian Americans in Boston =

Not all of the 5 million Italians who immigrated to the United States between 1820 and 1978 came through Ellis Island. Many came through other ports, including the Port of Boston. Exactly how many stayed in Boston is unknown, but it was enough to make Italians the second largest ancestry group in Boston, after the Irish. Most settled initially in the North End; others settled in East Boston, the West End, Roxbury, and other neighborhoods. These groups of Italians now mainly reside in the suburbs mostly north/northwest of the city, but the North End and East Boston still retain much of their Italian culture.

Most of Boston's Italian immigrants were southern Italians who had little money and could speak little to no English. They faced many hardships in the early years, including exploitation and discrimination. Contrary to popular myth, they did not improve their lot solely by working hard; they held protest rallies, organized labor unions, and were extremely active in the Democratic party. In addition, they were aided by local charitable organizations, mutual aid societies, and federal programs such as the Works Progress Administration and the G.I. Bill.

After World War II, with the help of the G.I. Bill, many were able to attend college and join the ranks of the middle class. Many obtained home loans through the G.I. Bill and moved to the suburbs. The North End has been gentrified, but retains much of its old character in the form of Italian restaurants and traditional festivals.

== History ==
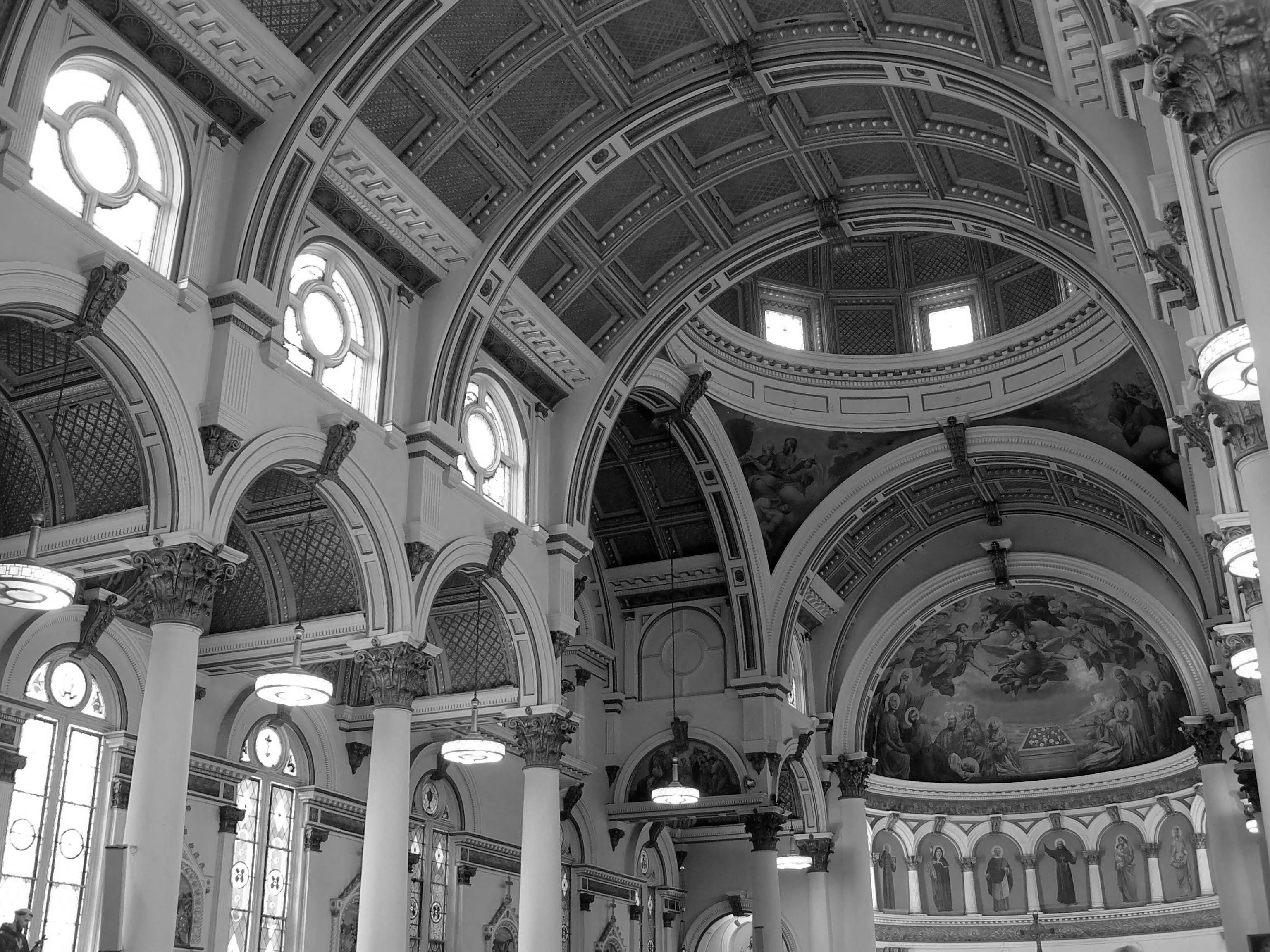
Founded in 1873 by Italian immigrants, St. Leonard's Church is one of the oldest Italian churches in the United States.

Prior to 1855, census records showed no Italians living in Boston. Most arrived in three waves of immigration: the first starting in the late 19th century; the second and largest following World War I; and the third following World War II. Most settled initially in the North End of Boston.

=== 1890s – 1910s ===
The first wave of Italian immigration to Boston occurred in the late 19th century. In 1890, Boston's Italians numbered less than 5,000 and accounted for only 3% of Boston's foreign-born population. By 1897, that figure had risen to 11%, with 18,000 living in the North End alone. Others lived in East Boston, Roxbury, the West End, and other neighborhoods.

The first arrivals were mostly northern Italians from Genoa and Parma. The northern Italians were generally better off and better educated than those who came to Boston later from agrarian southern Italy, the majority of whom were poor, illiterate, and non-fluent in English.

The North End

When Italians began arriving in large numbers, the North End was already occupied by thousands of Irish and Jewish immigrants. The area's many low-rent tenements and proximity to downtown made it a natural choice for poor and working-class Italian immigrants as well. As the neighborhood became increasingly Italian, other ethnic groups began to move out. Irish immigrants, who had settled there during the Great Famine, numbered 15,000 in 1880; ten years later, only 5,000 remained. A large number of Jewish immigrants had also settled there, started businesses, and built synagogues; they stayed on longer than the Irish, but eventually they too were crowded out. By 1905, of the 27,000 people living in the North End, 22,000 were Italians. Groups of immigrants who had lived in the same part of Italy formed small enclaves, Abruzzesi on one block, Avellinesi on another, and so on.

Community support

During this period, Italians faced many obstacles—poverty, discrimination, a language barrier—but they also received various forms of assistance from sympathetic Bostonians. Some, such as Boston attorney George A. Scigliano, had a special interest in helping Italians. Others were private philanthropists, community activists, charitable organizations, and mutual aid societies whose aim was to help immigrants, the poor, and workers in general.

George Scigliano, a lawyer who served on the Boston Common Council and the Massachusetts legislature at the turn of the century, worked to improve the lives of local Italians. Among other things, he called public attention to the exploitative padrone system, and worked to end it; he introduced legislation to regulate the loosely run "immigrant banks", which were notorious for cheating poorly educated workers out of their savings; he founded the Italian Protective League of Boston, a benevolent society for new immigrants; and he helped to defeat a bill that would have required workers to be naturalized.

James Donnaruma, an immigrant from Salerno, founded La Gazzetta del Massachusetts, a popular Italian-language newspaper, in 1905. As editor he used his influence to help local Italians, advocating for them in his paper, writing letters to Congress, recommending people for jobs, supporting Italian political candidates, and making generous charitable donations.

The North Bennet Street Industrial School was founded in 1885, with the support of philanthropist Pauline Agassiz Shaw, to provide job training for Italian and Jewish immigrants. The North End Union, a social service agency founded by the Benevolent Fraternity of Churches in 1892, provided food, daycare, cooking classes, and other aid. The Saturday Evening Girls club, started by Edith Guerrier in 1901, hosted educational discussions and lectures, published a newspaper called the S.E.G. News, and operated an acclaimed pottery with a store in Boston. In 1904, Domenic D'Alessandro founded the Italian Laborers Union, with the help of George Scigliano, to combat the exploitation of immigrant workers.

"An excitable people"

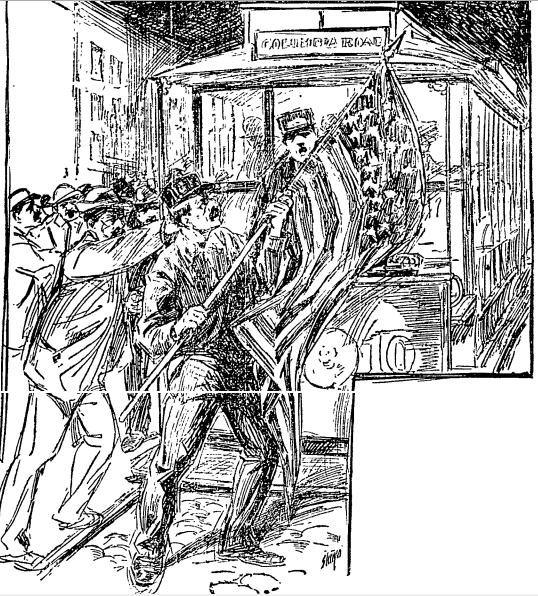
Artist's conception of the "Federal Street Riot".

To the Yankees of Puritan-founded Boston, the Italian immigrants were exotic and a little unsettling. Sociologist Frederic Bushée described them as "an excitable people" but "on the whole ... good-natured and friendly."

Following the lynching of 11 Italians in New Orleans in 1891, 1,500 Boston Italians—with "coal black hair and eyes", according to the Boston Globe—gathered in Faneuil Hall to protest and demand reparations. One of the speakers, a Dr. R. Brindisi, urged the audience, "Italians, be calm! Don't get excited! Trust to the authorities of this government to see that justice is done." The following week, Massachusetts representative Henry Cabot Lodge published an article in the North American Review in which he defended the lynch mob and proposed new restrictions on immigration.

In August 1905, some 200 members of the North End's Liguria Society were parading down Federal Street when a trolley car driver refused to stop for them. Several "young ruffians" jumped onto the car and "set upon" the driver and the conductor, breaking windows and sending the passengers fleeing in terror. The fight, in which the conductor's nose was broken, "created a sensation" in Boston, and still turns up in Internet searches as the Federal Street Riot of 1905.

=== World War I ===
In 1917 there were an estimated 50,000 Italians living in Boston. Approximately 8,000 Boston Italians served in the U.S. military during World War I. Others served in the Italian military.

After the war ended, tens of thousands of Italians emigrated to Boston. The vast majority were from southern Italy: many from Sciacca in Sicily, and others from Naples, Abruzzi, Calabria, and Potenza.

In 1918, the Spanish Influenza Pandemic hit the crowded North End severely; so many children were orphaned as a result of the pandemic that the city created the Home for Italian Children to care for them. The Home for Italian Children was later renamed the Italian Home for Children. Located in Jamaica Plain, it now provides residential and day treatment for children with emotional and learning difficulties.

On January 15, 1919, the Purity Distilling Company's 2.3 million gallon molasses storage tank burst open, causing the Great Molasses Flood. A massive wave of molasses flowed down Commercial Street towards the waterfront, killing 21 people and injuring 150. Lawyers for the tank's owners tried to blame the explosion on Italian anarchists. The accident was later found to be due to the tank's poor construction and maintenance, but not before the initial reports had fueled anti-Italian sentiment.

=== 1920s ===
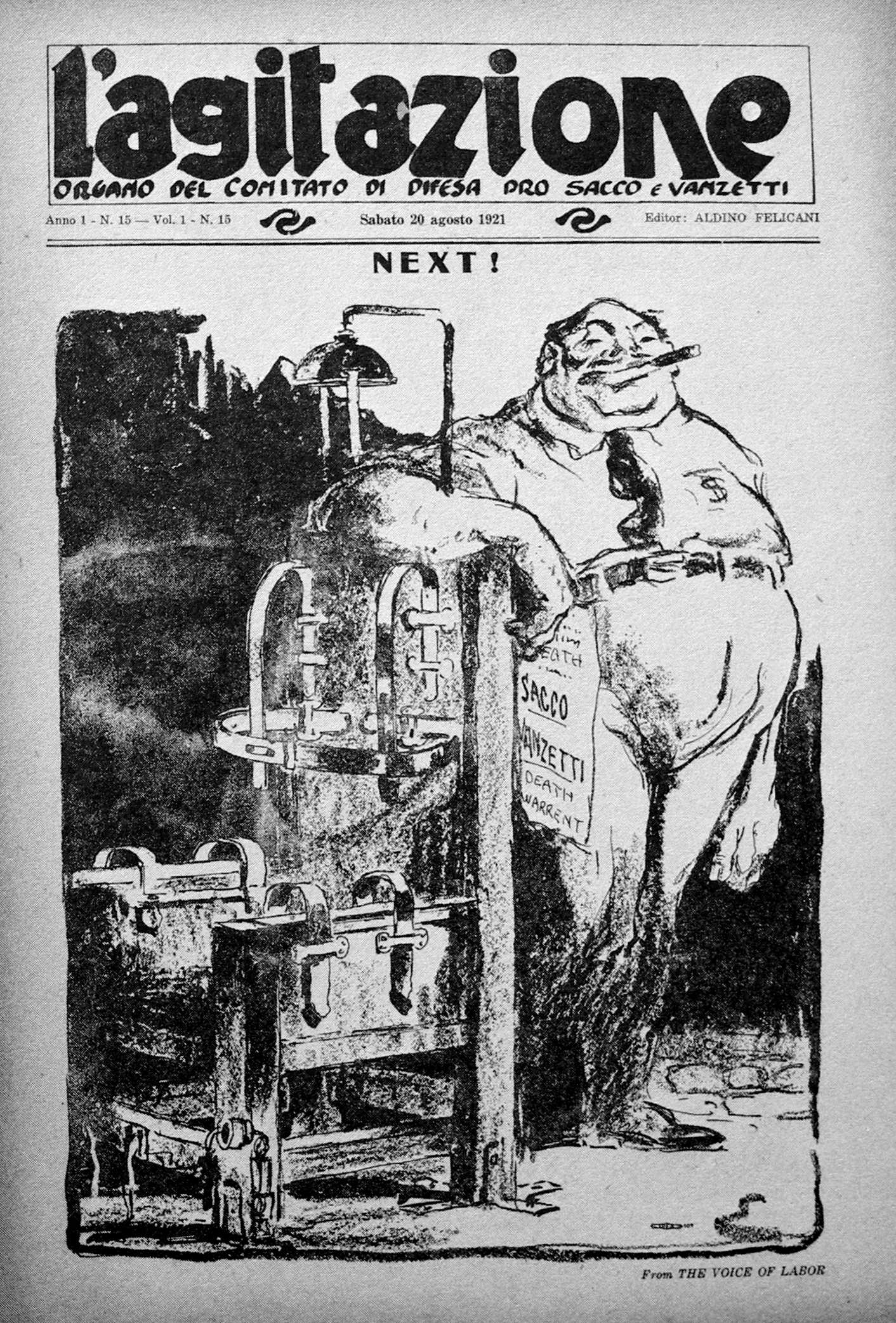
L'Agitazione was the Italian-language bulletin of the Sacco-Vanzetti Defense Committee (SVDC), which was headquartered in Boston.

During Prohibition there were some Italian bootleggers in Boston, but for the most part the business was controlled by the competing Irish and Jewish mobs led by Frank Wallace and Charles "King" Solomon. People of other ethnicities were also involved. The Patriarca crime family, founded by Gaspare Messina in 1916, expanded during the 1920s but did not gain the upper hand in Boston until 1931, when they assassinated Wallace and the Irish assassinated Solomon.

In 1923, Logan Airport was built in East Boston, which had a sizable Italian population. Area residents were less than enthusiastic about the airport and the noise and traffic that inevitably came with it.

Sacco and Vanzetti

Prior to their arrest in 1920, the Italian anarchists Nicola Sacco and Bartolomeo Vanzetti lived in Stoughton and Plymouth, Massachusetts, and had political ties to Boston. Most Boston Italians, although far from sympathetic to the anarchist cause, believed the pair were victims of anti-Italian bias.

In 1927, following Sacco and Vanzetti's execution in the Charlestown State Prison, they were laid out at the Langone funeral home in the North End, where they were viewed in open caskets by over 10,000 mourners over two days. At the funeral parlor, a wreath over the caskets announced In attesa l'ora della vendetta (Awaiting the hour of vengeance). On Sunday, August 28, a two-hour funeral procession bearing huge floral tributes moved through the city. Thousands of marchers took part in the procession, and over 200,000 came out to watch. The Boston Globe called it "one of the most tremendous funerals of modern times."

Fifty years later, in 1977, Massachusetts Governor Michael Dukakis issued a proclamation—significantly, in both English and Italian—declaring August 23 Nicola Sacco and Bartolomeo Vanzetti Memorial Day, and asking the public "to reflect upon these tragic events, and draw from their historic lessons the resolve to prevent the forces of intolerance, fear, and hatred from ever again uniting to overcome the rationality, wisdom, and fairness to which our legal system aspires."

In 1997, Thomas Menino, Boston's first Italian-American mayor, and acting governor Paul Cellucci formally accepted on behalf of the city a bas-relief sculpture memorializing Sacco and Vanzetti. The piece, created by Gutzon Borglum (of Mount Rushmore fame), had been repeatedly offered as a gift to the city and rejected. In 1937, Massachusetts Governor Charles Hurley called it "a patently absurd gesture", while Boston mayor Frederick Mansfield said it had "no possible chance of acceptance." It was rejected again in 1947 and 1957. The piece now hangs in the Special Collections lobby of the Boston Public Library. It shows the two men in profile, with a quote from Vanzetti's final prison letter:

What I wish more than all in this last hour of agony is that our case and our fate may be understood in their real being and serve as a tremendous lesson to the forces of freedom so that our suffering and death will not have been in vain.

=== 1930s ===
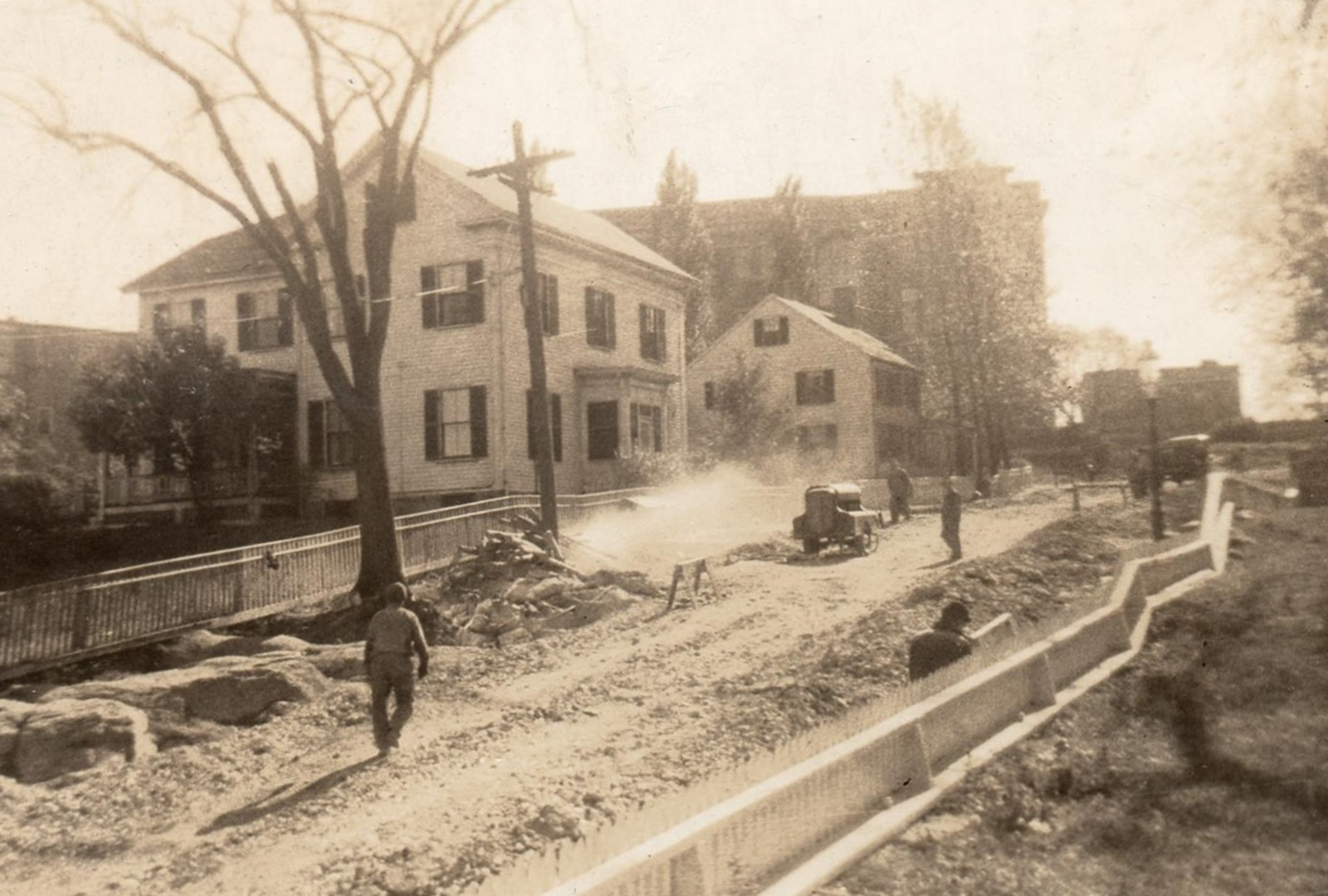
Italian-American WPA workers doing roadwork in Dorchester, 1930s.

By 1930 the North End was more densely populated than Calcutta, with more than 44,000 Italians living in an area less than a mile square. Most lived in overcrowded tenements with shared outdoor toilets. Fewer than 20% of the apartments had baths; residents bathed in sinks or public bath houses. At the same time, there was comparatively little street crime in the neighborhood.

In the late 1930s, sociologist William Foote Whyte spent several years living in the North End, studying the social dynamics of the local gangs and bookmakers. His original plan was to come back later and study the people's family and religious life, but health problems interfered. In 1943 he published a groundbreaking case study titled Street Corner Society: The Social Structure of an Italian Slum which became a bestseller and a classic college text for students of sociology and anthropology. Years after the book's publication, Whyte revealed the identities behind the pseudonyms he had used in his study. Among them were Joseph A. Langone, Jr. and his wife Clementina, who appear in the book as Mr. and Mrs. George Ravello.

Mr. and Mrs. Langone were influential in Depression-era Boston politics. Joseph A. Langone, Jr. ran the Langone family funeral home, which handled the funeral of Sacco and Vanzetti. As a first lieutenant in the Massachusetts State Guard, he had once led a company during the Boston Police strike of 1919. He was elected to the Massachusetts State Senate in 1932, narrowly defeating six Irish-American candidates, and ending years of Irish political domination in his district, which included East Boston, Charlestown, and the North, West, and South Ends. He went on to serve four consecutive terms, and was Boston Election Commissioner in several James Michael Curley administrations. Langone's wife "Tina" was also well known in the community. As a member of the Massachusetts Board of Immigration and Americanization, she helped countless local Italian immigrants assimilate and obtain U.S. citizenship. Langone Park in the North End is named for the couple.

According to some historians, Italians in Boston were reluctant to apply for government relief during the Depression. Whyte writes in the introduction to Street Corner Society that "a large proportion of the population was on home relief or W.P.A." at the time. Being "on W.P.A." meant working on public projects funded by the Works Progress Administration, usually doing roadwork or construction.

=== World War II ===
After Mussolini declared war on the United States, Italians in Boston were anxious to prove their loyalty to their adopted country. Prominent local Italians publicly condemned Mussolini's actions, and young Italians rushed to enlist in the U.S. military. The navy was a popular option for Boston Italians, many of whom were fishermen. There was also a rush to obtain citizenship, with thousands of mostly Italian immigrants descending upon the immigration office within days of the announcement.

Nonnaturalized Italians in Boston, as elsewhere in the U.S., were declared "enemy aliens" in 1941. Many were older women who had not become citizens because of language or literacy issues, and many had one or more children enlisted in the service. The proclamation was especially hard on Boston's Italian fishermen, whose boats were beached or in some cases requisitioned for use as patrol boats and minesweepers.

Only two Boston Italians were interned, both radio broadcasters. One, Ubaldo Guidi, had had a popular pro-fascist radio show on WCOP in the thirties. When he was arrested, Guidi had two sons in the U.S. military.

Postwar immigration

There was a small wave of Italian immigration to Boston following World War II which lasted about 15 years, and brought immigrants from Sulmona, Apulia, Frascati, and elsewhere. Several of these new residents opened Italian restaurants, cafes, and bakeries in the North End, which helped to preserve the Italian atmosphere in the 1970s when the neighborhood began attracting "yuppies".

=== Exodus to the suburbs ===
After World War II, many Italian-American veterans took advantage of the G.I. Bill, which enabled them to go to college and buy houses in the suburbs, thus completing their assimilation into the American middle class. Italian Americans, along with other whites, enjoyed benefits of the G.I. Bill that were denied many African Americans due to racial discrimination.

The following Massachusetts cities and towns have the largest percentages of people of Italian descent.

1. Lenox Dale, Massachusetts, 42.47%
2. Revere, Massachusetts, 35.67%
3. Lynnfield, Massachusetts, 33.65%
4. Saugus, Massachusetts, 33.13%
5. Everett, Massachusetts, 28.73%
6. Stoneham, Massachusetts, 27.77%
7. Medford, Massachusetts, 27.20%
8. Winthrop, Massachusetts, 25.42%
9. Milford, Massachusetts, 24.96%
10. Wakefield, Massachusetts, 23.21%

In the 1970s, "yuppies" began moving into the North End. City councilman Frederick C. Langone helped slow the gentrification process by getting the city to build affordable housing for the elderly so that longtime residents would not have to leave the neighborhood.

== Politics ==
=== Democrats ===
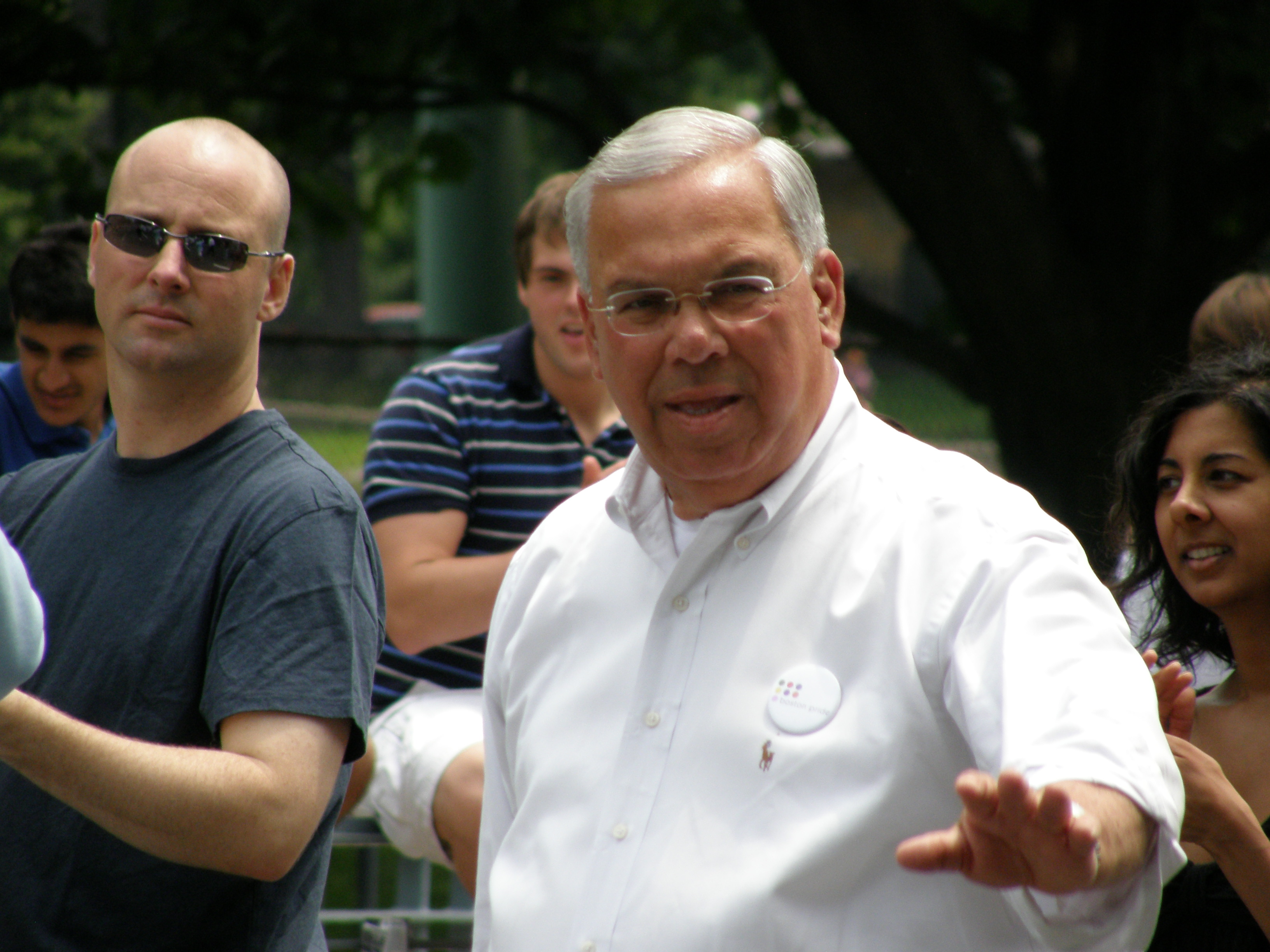
Thomas Menino, Mayor of Boston from 1993 to 2014

In the early days of Italian immigration, Boston Italians tended to vote Democratic. The one major exception was in 1920, when, disappointed that Wilson had not supported Italy's claim to the seaport city of Fiume, they voted for Harding. From 1920 to 1940 they voted consistently, overwhelmingly, Democratic. In 1924, Democratic candidates for Congress and the Massachusetts senate received about 90% of the Italian vote. During this period there was a massive push by the Democratic party to mobilize new voters. Between 1924 and 1940, the number of male voters in the North End tripled, and the number of female voters increased eightfold.

James Michael Curley, an Irish politician whose nickname was "mayor of the poor", was more popular with Italians and other immigrants in Boston than he was with the lace curtain Irish. In 1930, he was the guest of honor at a dinner attended by 400 Boston Italians at the Boston City Club, where he was presented with the Ordre Commendatore della Corona d'Italia (Order of the Crown of Italy) on behalf of King Victor Emmanuel III of Italy. The toastmaster, Dr. Joseph Santosuosso, insisted that Curley's real name was Giacomo Michel Curli, an "old and illustrious Italian name".

The "little man"

Several Italian-American Democrats from Boston were noted for championing the cause of the poor or the underdog.

Known as a fiery-tempered defender of the "little man", state senator Joseph A. Langone, Jr., launched an investigation into Boston's welfare department, alleging it was withholding money from the needy, and in 1939 organized a march on City Hall to demand better services for the North End. His son, city councilman Fred Langone, was an outspoken opponent of gentrification who succeeded in establishing rent control in the North End and getting the city to build affordable housing for the elderly and disabled. After his death, Mayor Menino said that Langone had "consistently fought on the side of the common guy". (Menino himself was recognized for his "unwavering commitment to the poorest neighborhoods".)

Christopher A. Iannella was one of the original "college boys" featured in Whyte's Street Corner Society. When he first arrived in the U.S. as a child, he could not speak English; he went on to graduate from Harvard Law School. As a state legislator, he served the district that included the West End, where he saw his own home torn down and replaced with luxury apartment buildings. He later served on the Boston city council, where he supported urban renewal projects only if they did not permanently displace area residents. On his death he was hailed as a "friend of the poor".

Francis X. Bellotti, the son of Italian immigrants, grew up poor in Boston's Roxbury and Dorchester neighborhoods, worked his way through law school, and became state attorney general, and later the lieutenant governor of Massachusetts. As state attorney general, he opposed legislation granting first amendment rights to corporations (see First National Bank of Boston v. Bellotti). Having been raised by a single mother, he also supported equal pay for women. In a 2010 article, Jody Santos dubbed him "the people's lawyer".

Msgr. Mimie Pitaro, the pastor of Most Holy Redeemer parish in East Boston, was the first Roman Catholic priest elected to the Massachusetts legislature. As a state representative from 1970 to 1972 and president of the East Boston Neighborhood Council, he fought against the expansion of Logan Airport, was instrumental in getting the BRA to build an elderly housing development instead of the waterfront motel it had planned, and worked in the hospice movement. His Globe obituary calls him a "a doughty fighter for powerless people".

=== Anarchists ===
Gruppo Autonomo was an anarchist group based in East Boston; in 1920 it had over 40 members. They were led by Luigi Galleani, an Italian insurrectionary anarchist who moved to the U.S. in 1901. Galleani, who lived in Wrentham, Massachusetts, started an anarchist newspaper called Cronaca Sovversiva in 1903; it was published in Barre, Vermont and later in Lynn, Massachusetts. Sacco and Vanzetti were subscribers and contributors. The Sacco-Vanzetti Defense Committee (SVDC) was headquartered in Boston and published an Italian-language bulletin, L'Agitazione.

The Galleanisti of Boston held demonstrations, rioted, and committed acts of terrorism. On December 6, 1916, the Galleanist Alfonso Fagotti was arrested for stabbing a policeman during a riot in North Square. The next day Galleanists bombed the Salutation Street station of the Boston harbor police. Fagotti was convicted, imprisoned, and later deported to Italy. On June 2, 1919, Carlo Valdinoci, a Galleanist from Roxbury, was killed trying to deliver a bomb to U.S. Attorney General A. Mitchell Palmer; this was one in a series of anarchist bombings that led to the Palmer Raids. Another Boston anarchist, Antonio Cesarini of Roxbury, was among those arrested during a riot that erupted during a labor march in Roxbury on May 1, 1919. Two police officers and a civilian were shot, another officer was stabbed, dozens of officers and marchers were injured, and 113 marchers were arrested. Fourteen were sent to prison by the presiding judge, Albert F. Hayden; a few days later, Hayden's home was bombed, causing a great deal of damage but no injuries.

Another radical group, the Industrial Workers of the World (IWW), held meetings in the North End in their hall on Richmond Street.

=== Fascists ===
In Boston as elsewhere, most Italians supported Benito Mussolini initially, growing disillusioned with him when he began collaborating with Adolf Hitler. In the 1920s there were at least ten fascist associations based in Massachusetts, including in Lawrence, Lowell, and Worcester. The Boston fascists had their own Italian-language newspaper, Giovinezza (Youth). In the thirties, pro-fascist radio commentator Ubaldo Guidi, who broadcast on WCOP in Boston, was a local favorite. In 1942, when restrictions on nonnaturalized Italians were lifted, Louis Lyons of The Boston Globe reported:

Mussolini, whose picture used to hang in the kitchen in a great proportion of Italian homes in the North End, has lost face everywhere ... But the symbol, next to the service flag, now most common in Italian kitchens is a red, white and blue bunting with the letters 'God Bless America'.

=== Present day ===
Now that Italian Americans have assimilated and joined the ranks of the middle class, their politics have shifted. It is not unusual for Italian Americans in Boston, as elsewhere, to vote Republican or to run for office as Republicans; for example, Massachusetts governors Paul Cellucci and John Volpe were Republicans.

The Irish no longer dominate Boston politics as they once did. Due to intermarriage and other factors, the old rivalry between Irish and Italian Bostonians has slowed down, and people of Italian descent such as Thomas Menino have held top positions in city and state government.

== Business and economy ==
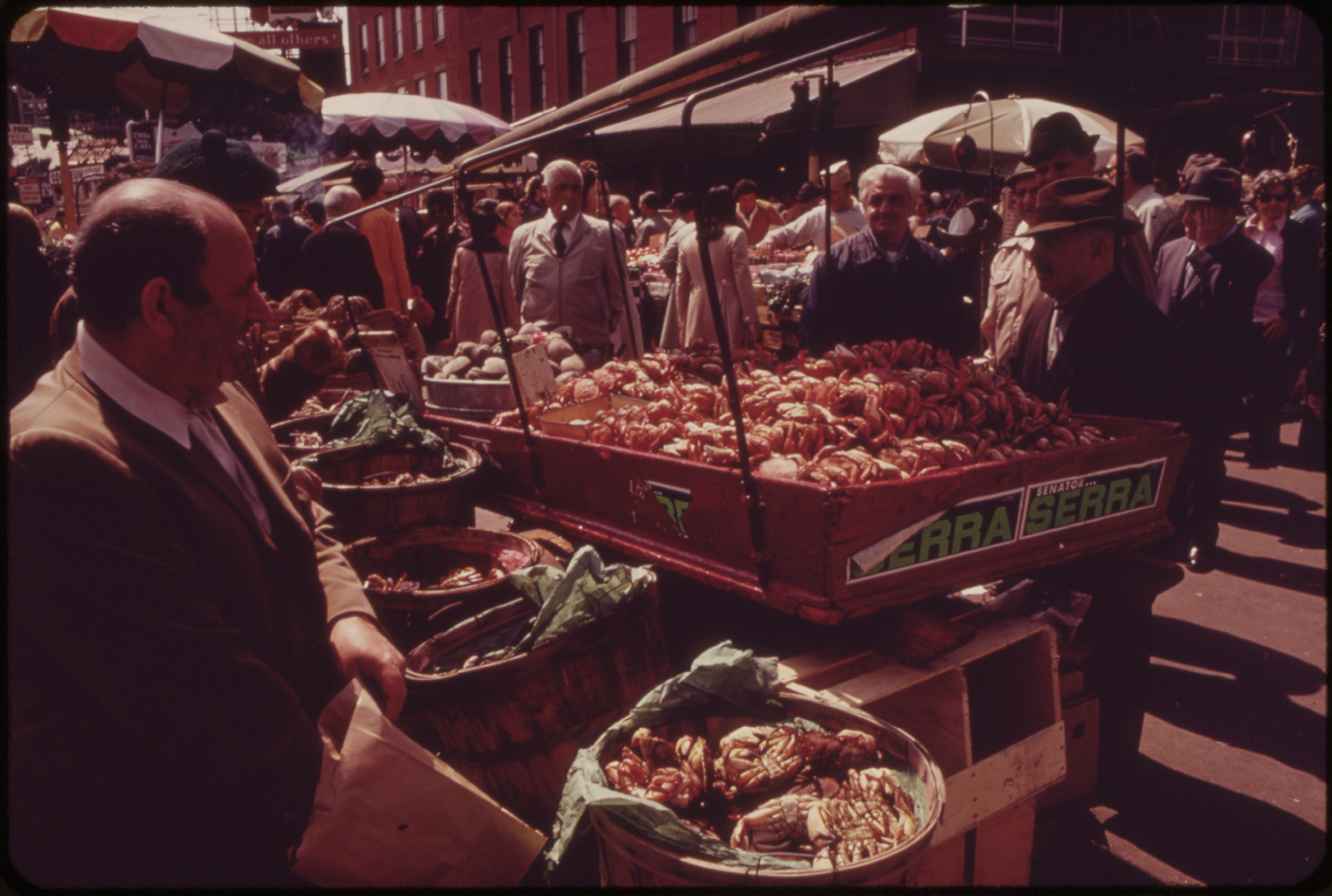
Haymarket vendors in 1973. Note the campaign sticker for Emanuel "Gus" Serra, who represented the First Suffolk District from 1970 to 1998. Serra ran for state senate in 1973 but lost to Michael LoPresti, Jr.

In the early 20th century, many Italian Americans started their own businesses. Alessandro Badaracco, an immigrant, ran Boston's largest fruit business in 1900. Many sold fruit and produce from pushcarts. Italians dominated the local fishing industry. Many went into barbering; by 1930, the majority of Boston's barbers were Italian.

Italian girls in Boston rarely went to work as domestics because they were expected to sleep under their parents' roof until they were married. Some women worked in the market gardens and farms around Boston, and in the factories and shops in town. Others were seamstresses. Some families made money by pooling their resources to rent an entire tenement and then subletting the apartments at a profit.

The Italian Chamber of Commerce of Boston and New England was established in 1906.

=== The Italian fishing fleet ===
Prior to World War II, Boston had two fishing fleets. The larger boats, which used the Main Fish Pier on Northern Avenue, fished the Grand Banks and stayed out for weeks at a time, returning with frozen fish. The Italian fleet used Fiske Wharf and Packet Pier (where the Christopher Columbus Waterfront Park is now). The Italian fishermen, who lived in the North and West Ends, were immigrants from Sciacca, Sicily, a major fishing port. One of the religious traditions they brought with them from Sciacca was an annual feast in honor of the Madonna del Soccorso (see Festivals). In their small boats, they fished Massachusetts Bay off Cape Cod, Martha's Vineyard, and Nantucket, returning after three or four days with fresh fish, mostly haddock. Fresh haddock came to be known as guinea haddock because it was brought in by the Italians.

After World War II, many of the fishermen who had served in the military chose new careers. Those who remained faced competition from the importers of Canadian fish, and a depleted fishing supply. Boston no longer has an Italian fishing fleet, but the Fisherman's Feast is still celebrated every August in the North End.

=== Historic businesses ===
Several notable companies were founded by Italian immigrants in Boston.

Luigi Pastene, an immigrant from Genoa, started selling produce from a pushcart in 1848. He and his son Pietro (Peter) opened a shop on Hanover Street in 1874. The business grew into one of the largest importers of Italian food: the Pastene Co., now based in Canton, Massachusetts.

Three Sicilian immigrants, Gaetano LaMarca, Giuseppe Seminara and Michele Cantella, founded the Prince Macaroni Company (later renamed Prince Pasta) on Prince Street in 1912. The business moved to Commercial Street a few years later, and to Lowell, Massachusetts in 1939. The Prince brand is now owned by New World Pasta.

Giuseppe (Joseph) Dragone, a Calabrian immigrant, founded the Dragone Cheese Co. in the North End in 1928. By the time the company moved to Medford in 1957, it had become one of the largest manufacturers of Italian cheeses in the U.S. The brand is now owned by Saputo Inc.

In 1919, brothers John and Paul Cifrino built Upham's Corner Market in Dorchester, one of the first supermarkets.

Boston's first Italian cafe, the Caffé Vittoria on Hanover Street, opened in 1929 and is still in operation today.

=== Present day ===
The North End is still known for having Italian restaurants. Aside from this area, it is no longer possible to generalize about the kinds of businesses run by Boston Italians or the kinds of careers they pursue.

== Culture ==
=== Religion ===
Like the Irish, most Italians are Roman Catholics; due to language and cultural differences, however, they preferred to form their own parishes. St. Leonard's Church was founded in 1873, and Sacred Heart Church in 1888. St. Leonard's was the first Roman Catholic church built in New England by Italian immigrants, and the second oldest Italian church in the U.S.

In the early 20th century, Methodist and Episcopalian ministers actively proselytized in the North End, and some Italians converted. Historian Charles J. Scalise coined the term "WIP" (White Italian Protestant) for Italian Americans who converted to Protestantism during the 19th and 20th centuries.

=== Festivals ===
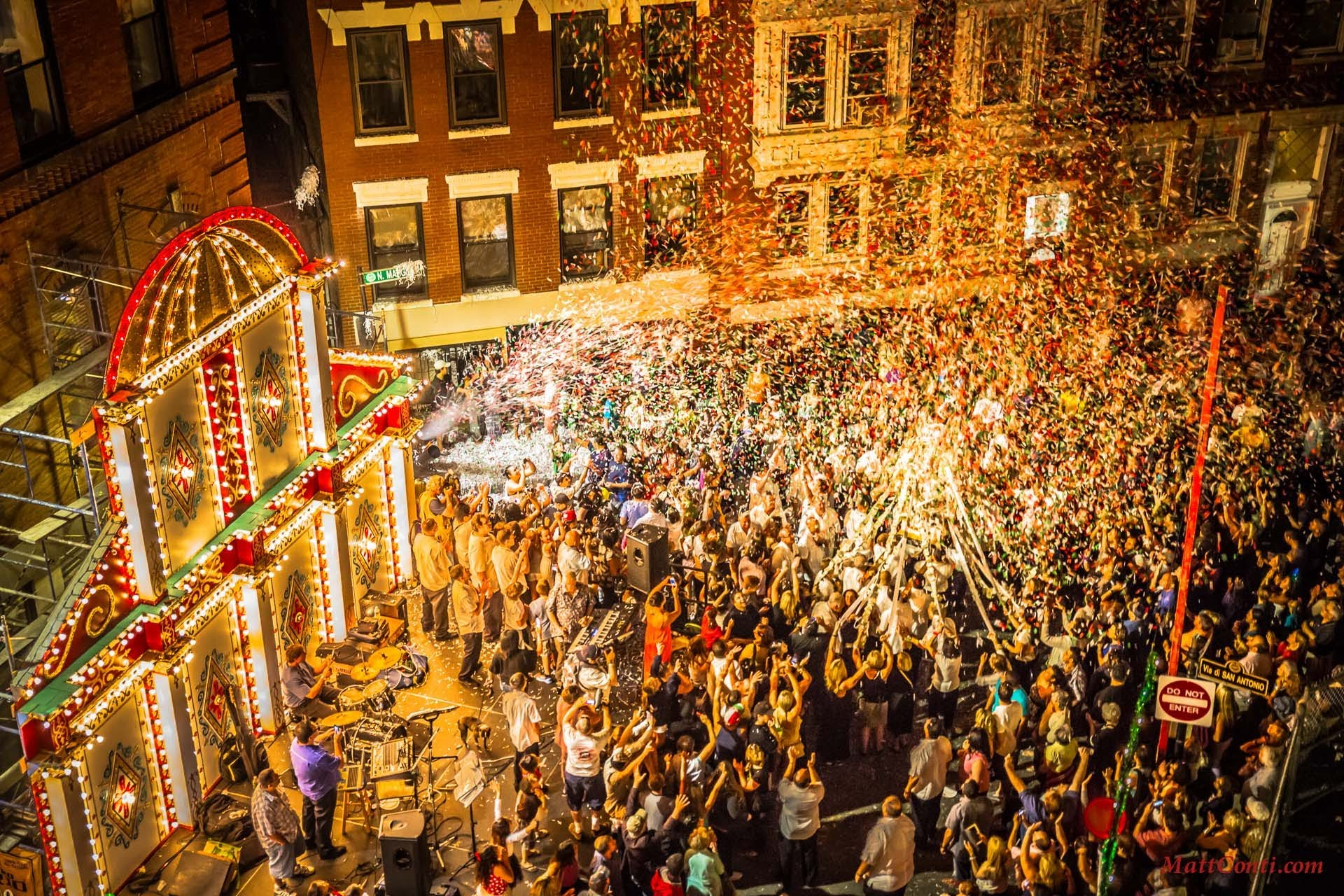
Feast of St. Anthony, 2013

When Italian immigrants arrived in Boston in the early 20th century, they brought their religious traditions with them. In Italy it was common for Catholics to celebrate the feast day of their local patron saint. Italian Americans in Boston still hold several of these festivals each year. Some are three-day street festivals complete with parades, fireworks, contests, live music, and Italian food concessions. Others, due to shifts in the population, have become smaller-scale events consisting mainly of a mass and a procession. The festivals attract tourists from across the world.

North End

The best known Italian festival in Boston is the Feast of St. Anthony, which has been celebrated every August in the North End since 1919. It originated in Montefalcione, Avellino, in honor of the town's patron saint, Sant'Antonio di Padova. The main event is a 10-hour-long procession in which a statue of the saint is carried through the streets of the North End, followed by marching bands and floats.

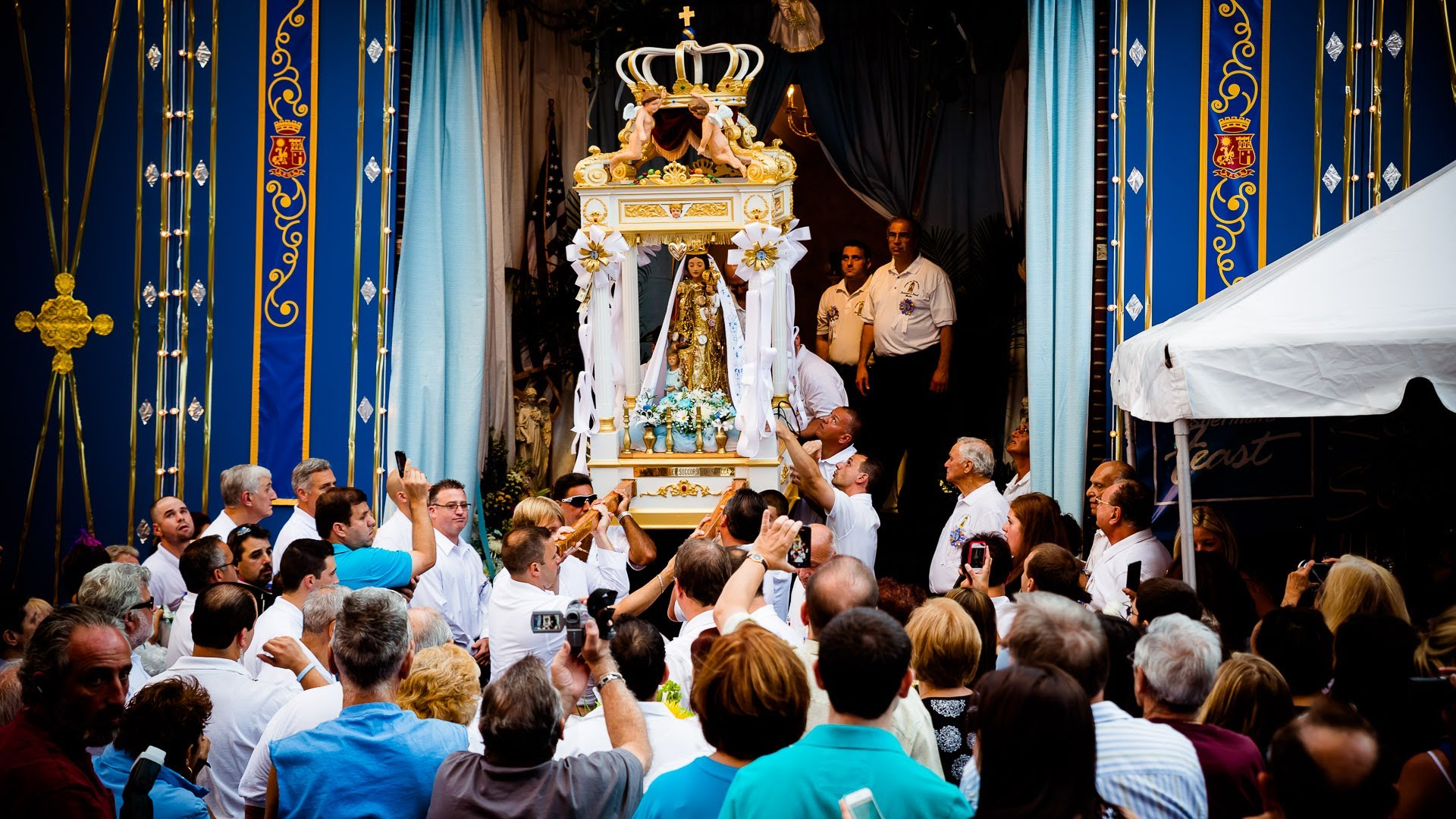
Fisherman's Feast, 2013

The Fisherman's Feast has been a tradition in the North End since 1910. It originated in Sciacca, Sicily, with the festival of the Madonna del Soccorso (Our Lady of Help), which dates back to the 16th century. Ceremonies include a procession to Boston Harbor for the blessing of the waters, and a performance in which a "flying angel" swoops down to greet the Madonna.

The Feast of Saint Agrippina di Mineo, a 3rd-century Roman martyr, originated in Mineo, Sicily, and has been celebrated in the North End since 1914. Festivities include a procession, games, raffles, and music.

Villagers from Pietraperzia, Sicily, brought the annual Madonna Della Cava (Our Lady of the Quarry) celebration to Boston in the early 20th century. According to legend, the Madonna appeared to a young villager in a dream and told him where to dig for a large stone that was miraculously adorned with her image. The stone still rests inside the Madonna Della Cava church in Sicily.

The annual Madonna Delle Grazie (Our Lady of Grace) procession is a tradition brought to the North End in 1903 by immigrants from San Sossio Baronia, Avellino.

East Boston

The Italia Unita festival is a secular festival held annually in East Boston since 1995. Italia Unita is a not-for-profit organization "promoting cultural awareness through Italian programs, events and scholarships".

Massachusetts

The Feast of Saints Cosmas and Damian, the "Healing Saints", has been celebrated in Cambridge since 1926. The tradition was brought over by immigrants from Gaeta, central Italy, whose patron saints were the 3rd-century martyrs and physicians Cosmas and Damian.

The Feast of Saint Rocco, celebrated in Malden, originated in 1929 as a way to raise money for influenza victims. Today the proceeds are donated to local food pantries and non-profit organizations in honor of Saint Rocco, who gave all his possessions to the poor.

Other Italian festivals in Massachusetts include the St. Peter's Fiesta in Gloucester, the Feast of the Madonna Della Luce (Mother of Light) in Hingham, the Feast of the Three Saints in Lawrence, and the Feast of Our Lady of Mount Carmel in Worcester.

=== Media ===
Newspapers

James V. Donnaruma started an influential Italian-language newspaper, La Gazzetta del Massachusetts, in 1905. Based in the North End, La Gazzetta is now published in English as the Post-Gazette, with the tagline "The Italian-American Voice of Massachusetts". A competing newspaper, The Italian News, was founded in 1921 by Principio A. ("P. A.") Santosuosso of Boston. The state's first English-language Italian newspaper, it ran weekly until 1959. The news website Bostoniano, founded by Nicola Orichuia, now bills itself as "Boston's Italian American Voice".

Radio

In the 1930s, the Prince Macaroni Company sponsored an "All Italian" radio talent show, the "Prince Macaroni Hour", on WAAB in Boston. In the 1950s and 1960s, WBZ's "Mr. Fix It" and "Homemaker Helper" were created by and for Italian Americans. Car Talk, a popular radio show on Boston-based WBUR-FM that ran from 1977 to 2012, was co-hosted by two Italian Americans, Tom and Ray Magliozzi.

== Discrimination and stereotyping ==
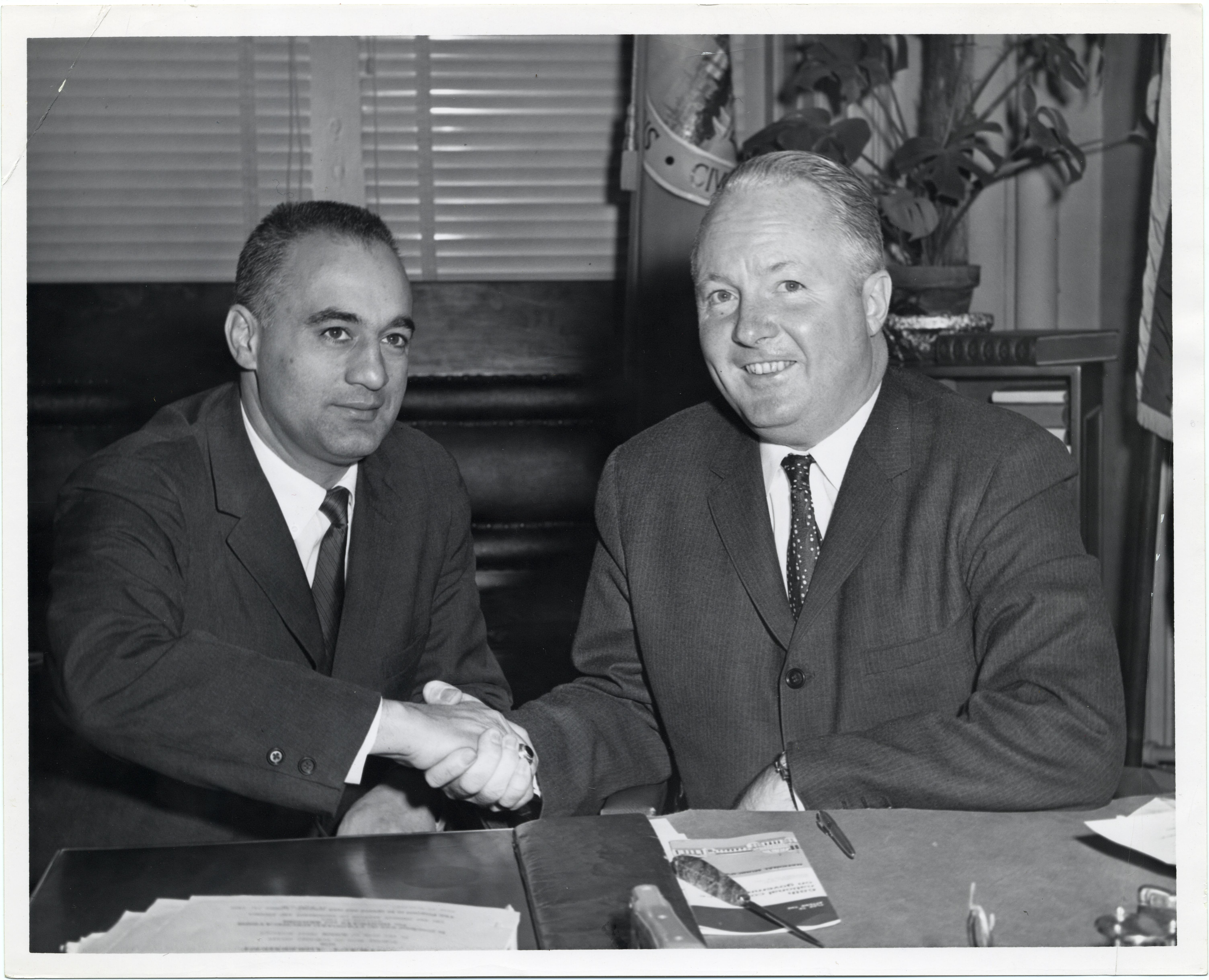
Candidate for Lieutenant Governor of Massachusetts Francis X. Bellotti and Boston Mayor John F. Collins, c. 1962

Police statistics of the early 20th century in Boston show that Italians were no more of a criminal element than any other foreign-born group in the city. Nevertheless, they were stereotyped as criminals and discriminated against by the police, the courts, schoolteachers, college admissions officers, and Irish political bosses who had the power to distribute jobs and favors.

In 1964, when Francis X. Bellotti ran against establishment candidate Endicott Peabody in the primary race for governor, Massachusetts senate president John E. Powers accused him of sabotaging the Democratic party, saying, "I don't want to see an Italian party, and that's just what these people are doing." At the St. Patrick's Day parade, South Boston residents pelted Bellotti with beer cans and shouted ethnic slurs. Rumors circulated that Bellotti was beholden to the Mafia. In fact, Mafia capos were caught on FBI surveillance tapes complaining about Bellotti's refusal to accept their campaign donations.

As recently as 2003, an article in Boston magazine (ironically titled "The Godfathers") described local Italian-American politicians as reluctant to call attention to their ethnicity lest they be stereotyped as criminals. When Robert Travaglini became president of the Massachusetts senate, for example, Boston Herald columnist Howie Carr opined that it was like "handing the keys to the State House to Tony Soprano".

Despite some lingering stereotypes, Italians have made great strides in Boston; so much so that in 2004 the Associated Press ran an article titled, "Move Over, Irish; Italians Now Rule Boston". Today it is other immigrant groups, such as Mexicans and Central Americans, whose experience is comparable to that of Italian Americans in the past.

=== Italians and the Irish ===
In the early 20th century, Italians in Boston, as in other cities, often clashed with the Irish despite the fact that the vast majority of both groups shared a common religion (Roman Catholic) and political party (Democratic). The Irish dominated Boston politics, the police department, and the local church hierarchy. In addition to having arrived earlier than the Italians, and in greater numbers, they had the advantage of speaking English and being generally lighter-complexioned than Italians, many of whom had olive skin. At the same time, working-class Irish and Italian residents were in competition for housing and jobs. Italians were often willing to work for less, and thus posed a threat to Irish job security.

The Sammarco case stirred local controversy in 1920. A fight broke out at a dance hall in Charlestown after an Italian youth danced with an Irish girl. According to witnesses, an Irish police officer who arrived at the scene began beating up the Italian. There was a scuffle, and the officer was shot and killed. One of the youth's friends, Joseph Sammarco, was arrested for murder, and was quickly tried, convicted, and sentenced to life in prison based on what many considered weak evidence. A Boston Globe story at the time read, "[Sammarco] is being given the speediest trial ever accorded a man charged with first degree murder in this country."

The animosity between the two groups diminished over time, and there were many Irish/Italian marriages.

=== Intra-Italian prejudice ===
In Boston as elsewhere, northern Italians often drew a sharp "racial" distinction between themselves and southern Italians. Northern prejudice against southern Italians may in fact have fueled discrimination against them by Americans.

In a 1901 Boston Globe series, five prominent Italian Americans were asked, "Is the Italian more prone to violent crime than any other race?" In his response, the Rev. Fr. Ubaldus Da Rieti distinguished between so-called "true Italians"—Genoese, Piedmontese, Tuscans, Lombardians, Venetians, Romans, Bolognese, and some Neapolitans—and those descended from "Albanians, Saracens, Greeks and Arabs", blaming the latter group for crime in the North End:

The true Italian type of countenance is oval, with a high forehead, an aquiline or old Roman nose, rather fair than dark in complexion, with black eyes and generally symmetrical outlines. The type of the Neapolitan who is not a genuine Italian is marked by a low forehead, small sharp nose, small mouth, small piercing black eyes, prominent cheek-bones, under-sized in stature, with a slinking downcast air when composed, and most violently gesticulative when excited in conversation. This is the criminal type that may be discovered as soon as observed. It sullies the name of Italian.

== Demographics ==
In 2014, people of Italian descent formed the second largest ancestry group in Boston, making up 8.2% of the population (after Irish Americans, who made up 15%). They were 13.6% of the population of Massachusetts.

In 2007, of the approximately 800,000 Italian Americans living in the Boston metropolitan area, fewer than 50,000 lived in Boston. Italian Americans were no longer predominant in East Boston, and were less than 40 percent of the population of the North End.

== Italian organizations in Boston ==
- Italian Americans for Indigenous Peoples Day
- Italia Unita (East Boston)
- Dante Alighieri Society of Massachusetts (Cambridge)
- Sons of Italy (Belmont, Newton)
- Italian Benevolent Society (Newton)
- Professionisti Italiani a Boston
- Scuola Piccoli Italiani di Boston

== See also ==
- Jules Aarons, street photographer who took many photos of Italians in the North End in the 1940s and 50s
- Scali bread, an Italian style of bread that is a regional specialty in Boston

== Sources ==
=== Books ===
Main

- Langone, Fred (1994). The North End: Where It All Began. Boston: Post-Gazette, American Independence Edition.
- Puleo, Stephen (2007). The Boston Italians: A Story of Pride, Perseverance, and Paesani, from the Years of the Great Immigration to the Present Day. Boston: Beacon Press. p. 81. ISBN 9780807050361.

Other

- Avrich, Paul (1991). Sacco and Vanzetti: The Anarchist Background. Princeton, N.J.: Princeton University Press. ISBN 9780691047898.
- Bushée, Frederick Alexander (1897). Italian Immigrants in Boston. Boston: South End House. JSTOR 60225533.
- Caetani, Gelasio (2008). Fascist and Anti-Fascist Propaganda in America: The Dispatches of Italian Ambassador Gelasio Caetani. Cambria Press. ISBN 9781621969266.
- Gamm, Gerald H. (1989). The Making of the New Deal Democrats: Voting Behavior and Realignment in Boston, 1920–1940. University of Chicago Press. p. 75. ISBN 9780226280608.
- Green, James R. (1979). Boston's Workers: A Labor History. Boston Public Library. ISBN 9780890730560.
- LaGumina, Salvatore J. (1999). Wop! A Documentary History of Anti-Italian Discrimination in the United States. Montreal: Guernica Editions. ISBN 9781550710472.
- Petronella, Mary M. (2004). Victorian Boston Today: Twelve Walking Tours. UPNE. p. 43. ISBN 9781555536053.
- Whyte, William Foote (1981). Street Corner Society: The Social Structure of an Italian Slum (Third ed.). University of Chicago Press. ISBN 0226895432.
- Acts and Resolves Passed by the General Court of Massachusetts. University Press of Cambridge. 1906.

=== Articles ===
The Boston Globe

- "Bade Be Calm. Shook Faneuil Hall With Cheers for America. Italians of the Hub Both Loyal and Indignant. In Mass Meeting Declare No Mafia Here". The Boston Globe. March 18, 1891.
- "Death of Peter Pastene". The Boston Globe. March 10, 1901.
- "Is the Italian More Prone to Violent Crime Than Any Other Race?". The Boston Globe. August 4, 1901.
- "Paraders in a Fight: Italians Make an Attack On Men in Charge of Electric Car". The Boston Globe. August 30, 1905.
- "The Italian in America: Social Equality is His Greatest Wish. Few Italian Girls Enter the Domestic Service. Love of Home Life is One of the Reasons". The Boston Globe. March 18, 1906.
- "Death Claims Three Noted Men: North End Loses Leader". The Boston Globe. June 18, 1906.
- "Police Fight Reds in Roxbury: 113 Arrested, Scores Hurt". The Boston Globe. May 2, 1919.
- "New Speed Record in Sammarco Trial: Woman Saw Slayer But Says He Was Not Defendant". The Boston Globe. March 3, 1920.
- "Thousands Struggle to Glimpse Bodies". The Boston Globe. August 26, 1927.
- "200,000 See Huge Parade: Force Used to Drive Back Line of Sacco-Vanzetti Marchers at Forest Hills". The Boston Globe. August 29, 1927.
- "Italians of Boston Pay Curley Honor". The Boston Globe. June 8, 1930.
- "Senator Langone Tells Sons of Italy He Probably Will Seek Higher Office". The Boston Globe. July 4, 1938.
- "Italians of Boston Lift Heads Again; 'Enemy' Ban Is Off". The Boston Globe. October 18, 1942.
- "FCC Will Probe Station WCOP; Cites Fascist Ties". The Boston Globe. December 17, 1942.
- "Mrs. Langone, Civic Leader, Dies at 67". The Boston Globe. April 21, 1964. Archived from the original on September 22, 2017.
- "'Who Does He Think He Is?'--Powers". The Boston Globe. September 9, 1964.
- "P. A. Santosuosso, Was Publisher; 75". The Boston Globe. April 7, 1968.
- "Fears of '66 come alive". The Boston Globe. October 1, 1974.
- "200 attend dedication of N. End Park". The Boston Globe. September 14, 1975.
- "Comedy Clubs Serious Business to Jay Leno". The Boston Globe. January 21, 1983. Archived from the original on October 19, 2016.
- "Giuseppe Dragone; Founder of Cheese Company". The Boston Globe. March 25, 1983.
- "Iannella funeral draws nearly 1,000; Boston councilor called friend of poor". The Boston Globe. September 19, 1992.
- "Msgr. Mimie Pitaro, 79; pastor, legislator who served 'little guy'". September 4, 1995.
- "Frederick C. Langone, at 79; Colorful Boston Councilor". The Boston Globe. June 26, 2001.
- "Thomas M. Menino, Boston's longest serving mayor, dies at 71". The Boston Globe. October 30, 2014.
- "Mattapan church marks the life of Boston's former mayor". October 31, 2014.
- "Menino, the mayor who welcomed Sacco and Vanzetti". The Boston Globe. November 23, 2014.

Journals

- Larson, Kate Clifford (April 2001). "The Saturday Evening Girls: A Progressive Era Library Club and the Intellectual Life of Working Class and Immigrant Girls in Turn-of-the-Century Boston". The Library Quarterly. 71 (2). University of Chicago Press: 195–230. doi:10.1086/603261. JSTOR 4309506. S2CID 141250519.
- Newton, Christopher (1996). "From 'The Prince Macaroni Hour' to 'Car Talk': An Evolution of Italian American Radio". Italian Americana. 14 (1): 5–15. JSTOR 29776333.
- Santos, Jody (October 1, 2010). "The People's Lawyer: As attorney general, Bellotti gave new meaning to the term 'public servant'". BC Law Magazine: 12–15.
- Scalise, Charles J. (2006). "Retrieving the "WIPS": Exploring the Assimilation of White Italian Protestants in America". Italian Americana. 24 (2): 133–146. JSTOR 41427584.
- Whyte, William Foote (1939). "Race Conflicts in the North End of Boston". The New England Quarterly. 12 (4): 623–642. doi:10.2307/360446. JSTOR 360446.

Festival websites

- "Saint Anthony's Feast, North End, Boston".
- "The Fisherman's Feast, North End, Boston".
- "Feast of St. Agrippina di Mineo, North End, Boston".
- "Feast of the Madonna Della Cava, North End, Boston".
- "Madonna delle Grazie Procession, North End, Boston".
- "Italia Unita festival, East Boston".
- "Feast of Saints Cosmas and Damian, Cambridge MA".
- "Saint Rocco's Feast, Malden MA".
- "St. Peter's Fiesta, Gloucester MA".
- "Feast of the Madonna Della Luce, Hingham MA". Facebook.
- "Feast of the Three Saints, Lawrence MA". Archived from the original on 2016-10-14.
- "Feast of Our Lady of Mount Carmel, Worcester MA".

Other

- Bouie, Jamelle (June 14, 2012). "The Democrats' Demographic Dreams". The American Prospect.
- Hannan, James (June 25, 2015). "Review of An Unlikely Union: The Love-Hate Story of New York's Irish and Italians". Commonweal.
- Keller, Jon (March 2003). "The Godfathers". Boston Magazine. Archived from the original on 2017-02-11.
- Kotz, Nick (August 28, 2005). "'When Affirmative Action Was White': Uncivil Rights". The New York Times.
- Nichols, Guild. "North End History: The Italians". North End Boston.
- Pasto, James (February 28, 2013). "Street Corner Society Revisited". Bostoniano.
- Peacott, Joe (2002). "Rocking The Cradle of Liberty: A Guide to Anarchist-Connected Historical Sites in Boston". Bad Press.
- Peter, Jennifer (October 5, 2004). "Move Over, Irish; Italians Now Rule Boston". Free Republic. Associated Press.
- Smith, Bonnie H. "Pauline Agassiz Shaw". Boston Women's Heritage Trail.
- Veronese, Gene P. (1977). "Italian-Americans & Their Communities of Cleveland: Part II, Italian Immigration and Settlement". The Cleveland Memory Project. Archived from the original on 2005-09-01.
- "Italian Timeline: 1850–1949". Boston Family History. Archived from the original on 2016-03-05.
- "About Bostoniano". Bostoniano.
- "Selected Social Characteristics in the United States: 2010–2014 American Community Survey 5-Year Estimates". American FactFinder. U.S. Census Bureau.
- "In the Hidden History of WWII, Italian Enemy Aliens Were Interned, Restricted". New England Historical Society. 15 August 2015.
- "About the Post-Gazette". The Post-Gazette.
- "Proclamation". Massachusetts Court System.
- "Forte, Felix, Papers". U. of Minn. Immigration History Research Center.
- "Cities with the Highest Percentage of Italians in Massachusetts".
