= Gamm =

Gamm may refer to:

== People ==
- Annett Gamm (born 1977), German diver
- Gerald Gamm (born c. 1964), American professor of political science
- Rüdiger Gamm (born 1971), German "mental calculator"
- Eva von Gamm (c. 1933 – 2017), German skater

== Other uses ==
- Gesellschaft für Angewandte Mathematik und Mechanik (GAMM; 'Society of Applied Mathematics and Mechanics')
- Gamm Theatre, in Warwick, Rhode Island, US
