= St. Leonard's Church (Boston) =

St. Leonard's
- St. Leonard of Port Maurice Church
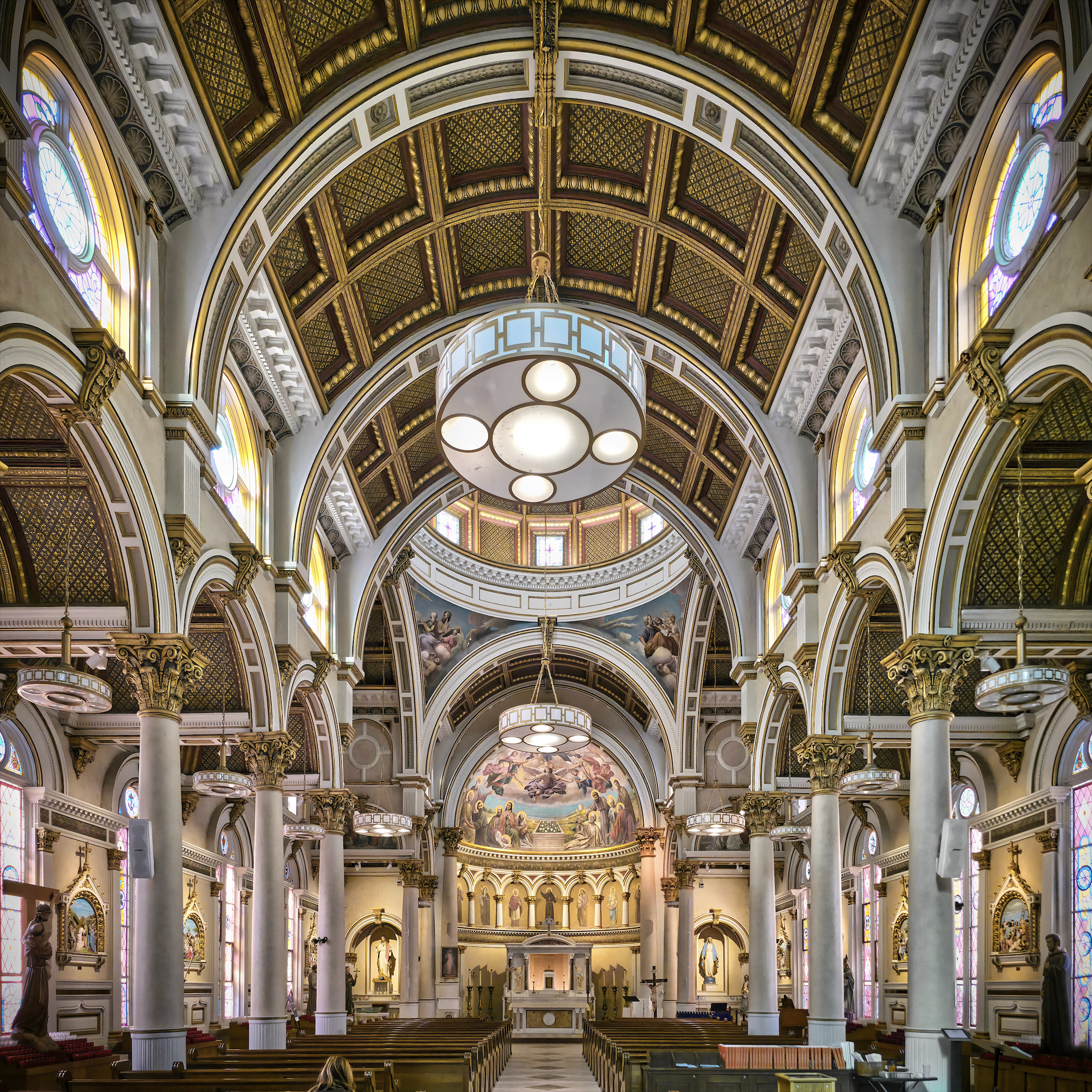
- Interior of St. Leonard's in 2025
- St. Leonard's
- 42.3645024°N 71.0539295°W
- Location: North End, Boston, Massachusetts
- Country: United States
- Denomination: Roman Catholic
- Website: SaintLeonardChurchBoston.com

History
- Founded: 1873
- Founder(s): Fr. Angelo Conterno, OFM
- Dedicated: 1899
- Consecrated: 1891

Architecture
- Architect: William Holmes
- Style: Romanesque Revival

Administration
- Province: Boston
- Diocese: Archdiocese of Boston
- Parish: St. Leonard of Port Maurice Parish

Clergy
- Archbishop: Richard Henning
- Pastor(s): Fr. Antonio Nardoianni, OFM

St. Leonard of Port Maurice Catholic Church, or more simply St. Leonard's, is a parish of the Catholic Church in the Archdiocese of Boston. It is noted for its historic parish church located at the corner of Hanover and Prince Streets in the North End of Boston, one of the oldest churches built by Italian immigrants in the United States. The church is a pending Boston Landmark. It is named after Leonard of Port Maurice.

== History ==
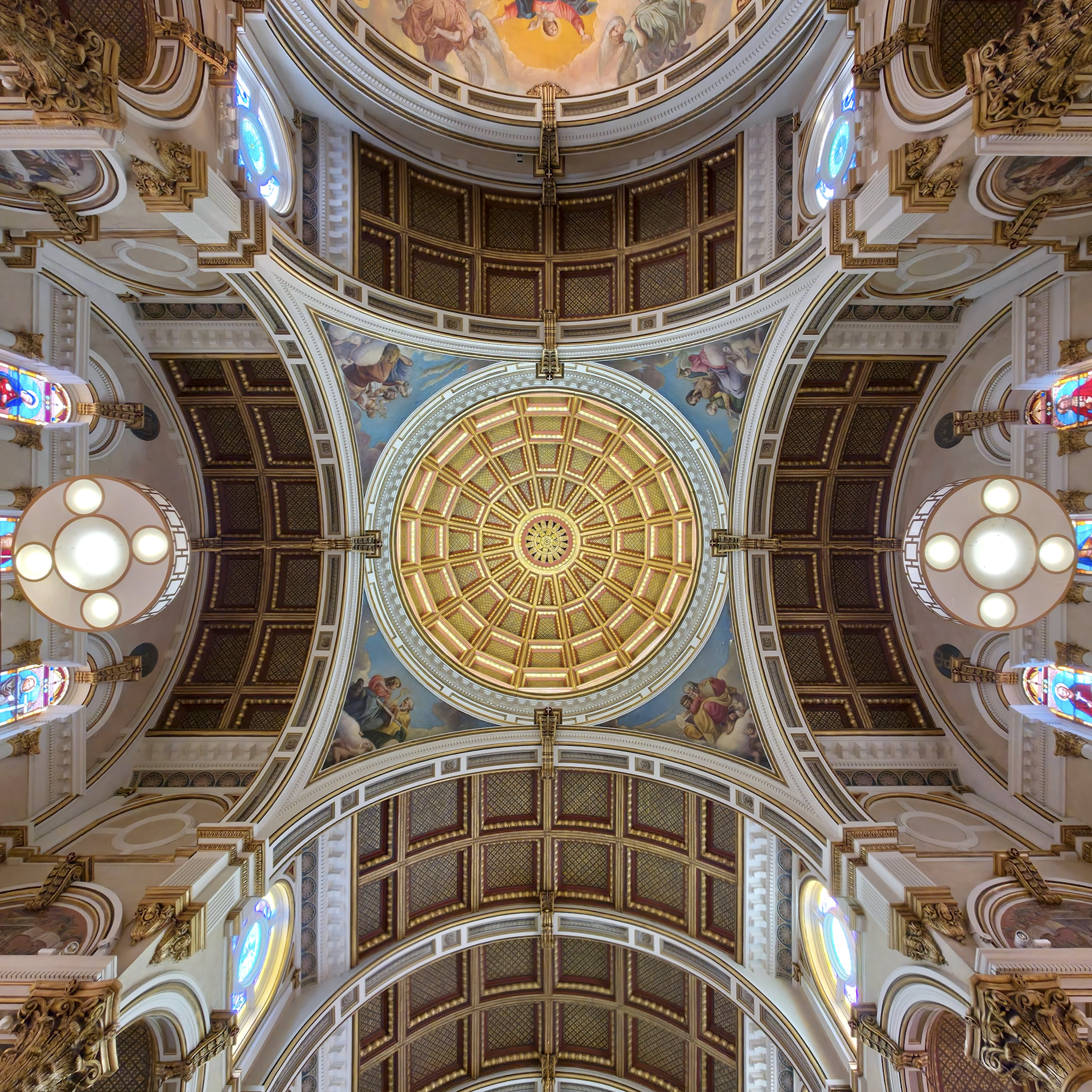
Interior dome

In 1873, Archbishop John Williams asked the Franciscans of the Immaculate Conception Province to minister to Boston's growing population of Italian immigrants. Fr. Angelo Conterno, OFM, founded St, Leonard of Port Maurice Church soon afterwards. Construction of the current building, designed in the Romanesque style by architect William Holmes, did not begin until 1885. The church in the basement opened to the public in 1891, with an estimated 20,000 parishioners. The upper church and the friary on North Bennet Street were completed in 1899. The interior, with its ornate Italian style and color scheme, was created by immigrant craftsmen who were also parishioners.

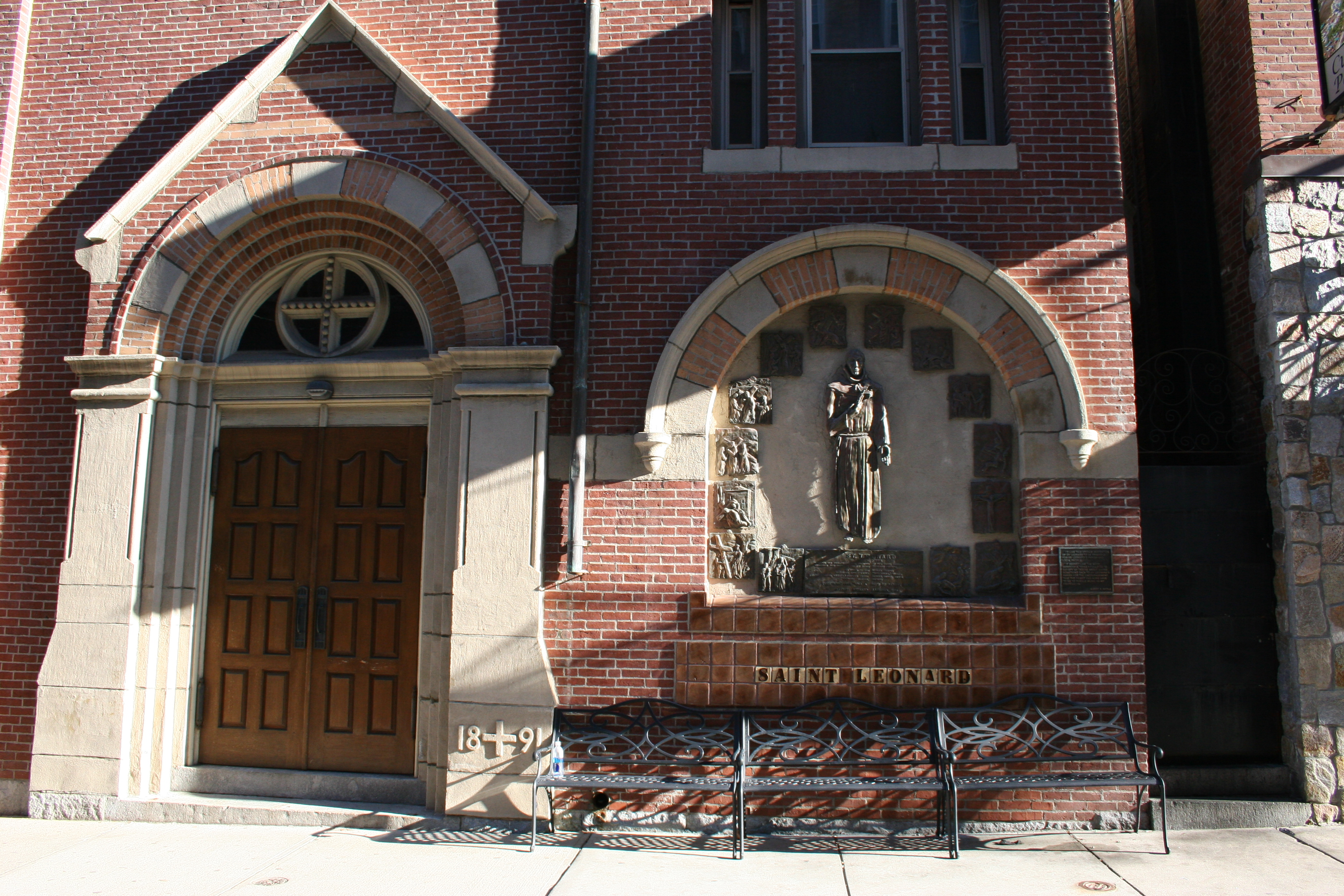
Front of Building featuring Bronze Sculpture by Richard Aliberti

The influenza epidemic of 1918 left many North End children orphaned. Fr. Antonio Sousa, the pastor of St. Leonard's Church at the time, founded the Home for Italian Children in Jamaica Plain to care for them. The home separated from the Catholic Church in 1968 and was renamed the Italian Home for Children in 1974. It is now a residential treatment center providing clinical services for emotionally challenged children.

Today, St. Leonard of Port Maurice Parish also includes the nearby Sacred Heart Church, Saint Stephen's Church, Saint Mary's Chapel, and Saint John Catholic Elementary School.

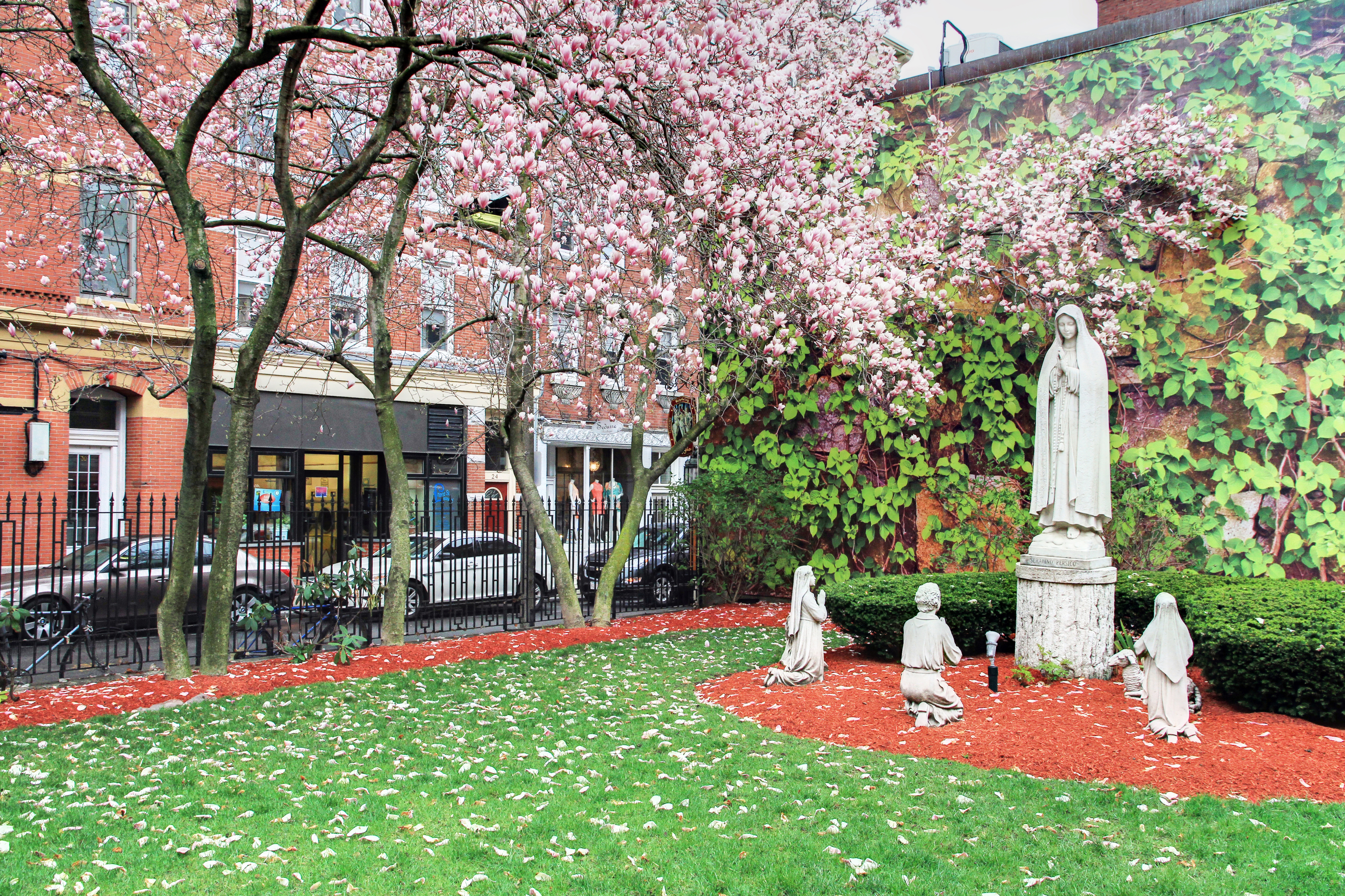
Peace Garden at St. Leonard's

St. Leonard's Church is known for its attractive Peace Garden, and for its St. Anthony shrine, which is the oldest of its kind in Boston. Masses are held in English and Italian, with a weekly radio ministry every Tuesday on WUNR (1600 AM). The parish office is located at 14 North Bennet Street. The parish sponsors the annual St. Anthony's festival celebration in the North End.

St. Leonard's Church has had twice-hourly bells daily from 7 AM to 10 PM.

== See also ==
- History of Italian Americans in Boston
