= Feast of Saints Cosmas and Damian =

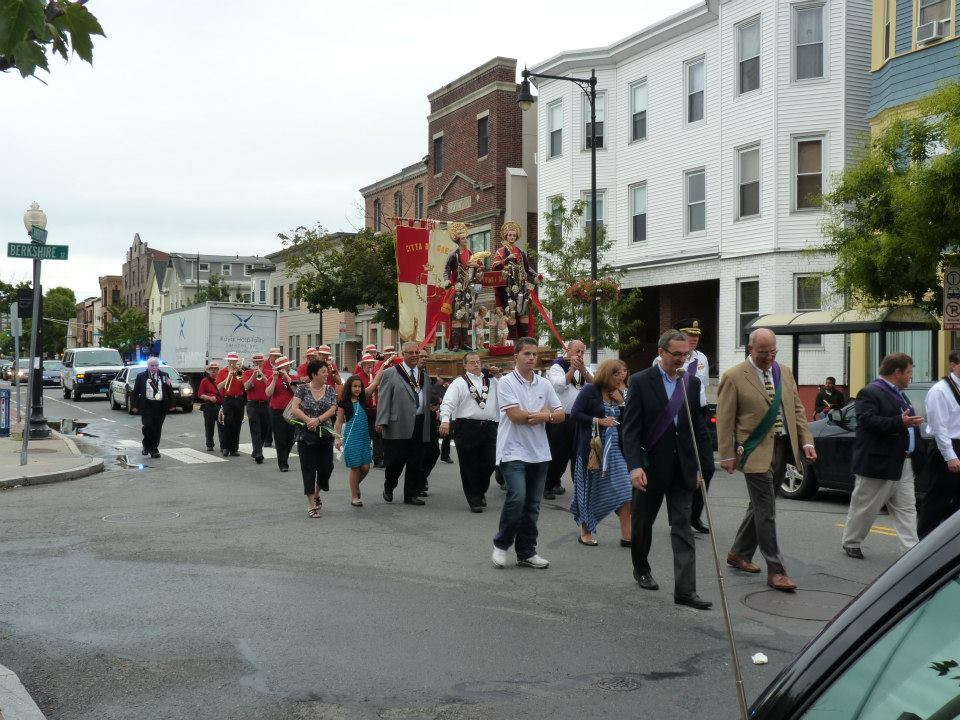
The statues of Saints Cosmas and Damian are carried in the procession to Church in 2012

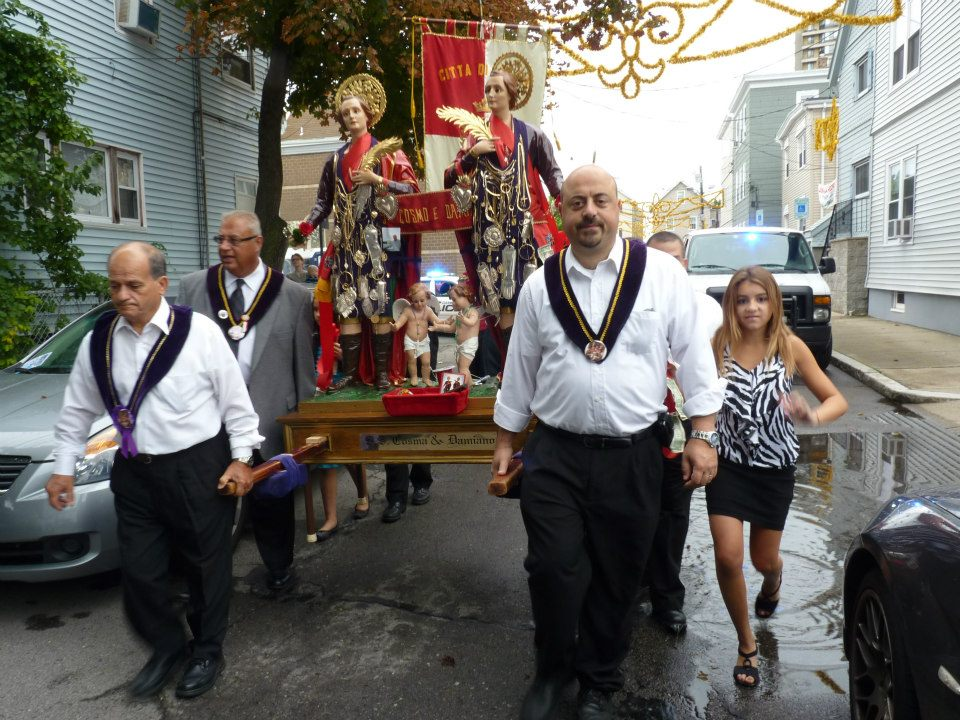
Statues of Saints Cosmas and Damian are carried in East Cambridge on opening night of the feast in 2012

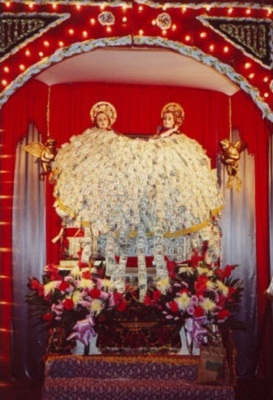
Statues of Saints Cosmas and Damian are covered in money by the end of the feast each year

The Feast of Saints Cosmas and Damian is an Italian/ American festival in honor of the Catholic Saints Cosmas and Damian. It is an annual event that thousands of people attend each year in Cambridge and Somerville, Massachusetts. The Feast typically takes place the weekend after Labor Day.

Just like other Italian feasts in the area (like Saint Anthony's Feast and the Fisherman's Feast), large life-sized statues of the saints are carried by members of the Saints Cosmas and Damian Society down local streets. As the Procession moves along, the Saints are stopped at each house, where people put money and gold on the statues. By the end of the festival, the statues of the saints are filled with money and gold.

As the statues of the Saints are carried down the streets of East Cambridge and Somerville, they are greeted with fireworks, confetti, and balloons. Before the Saints are carried away from each house, they are lifted three times by the carriers to bless the home.

There are also many concessions on the streets of the Feast that are also open to the public. Vendors sell food, items, souvenirs, games, and more. Carnival rides are set up on the local streets. Free entertainment for all is also present throughout the entire weekend. Over the years, many well-known groups have performed at the Feast, such as Taváres, The Village People, Tony Orlando, The Platters, The Drifters, Exposé and Cover Girls.

== Feast History ==
The Feast began in 1926, when Italian immigrants from the city of Gaeta immigrated to the United States in large numbers. These immigrants formed the Society of Saints Cosmas and Damian, which is now a non-profit organization.

When the Saints Cosmas and Damian Society first began, the members sent to Italy for the statues of the saints and each of them paid $265 for them. The Society was broken up into a men's society and a women's society, which both united in 1993.

It was canceled from 1942 to 1944.

== The Saints ==
Saints Cosmas and Damian were twin physicians in Arabia who lived during the time period of 280 A.D. They were Christians that did not accept any form of payment from their patients. Because of their religion, the ruler tried to have them killed, but failed three times. They were finally decapitated in 287 A.D.

== See also ==
- Italian Americans in Boston
