= Seamen's Bethel, Boston =

Sacred Heart Church
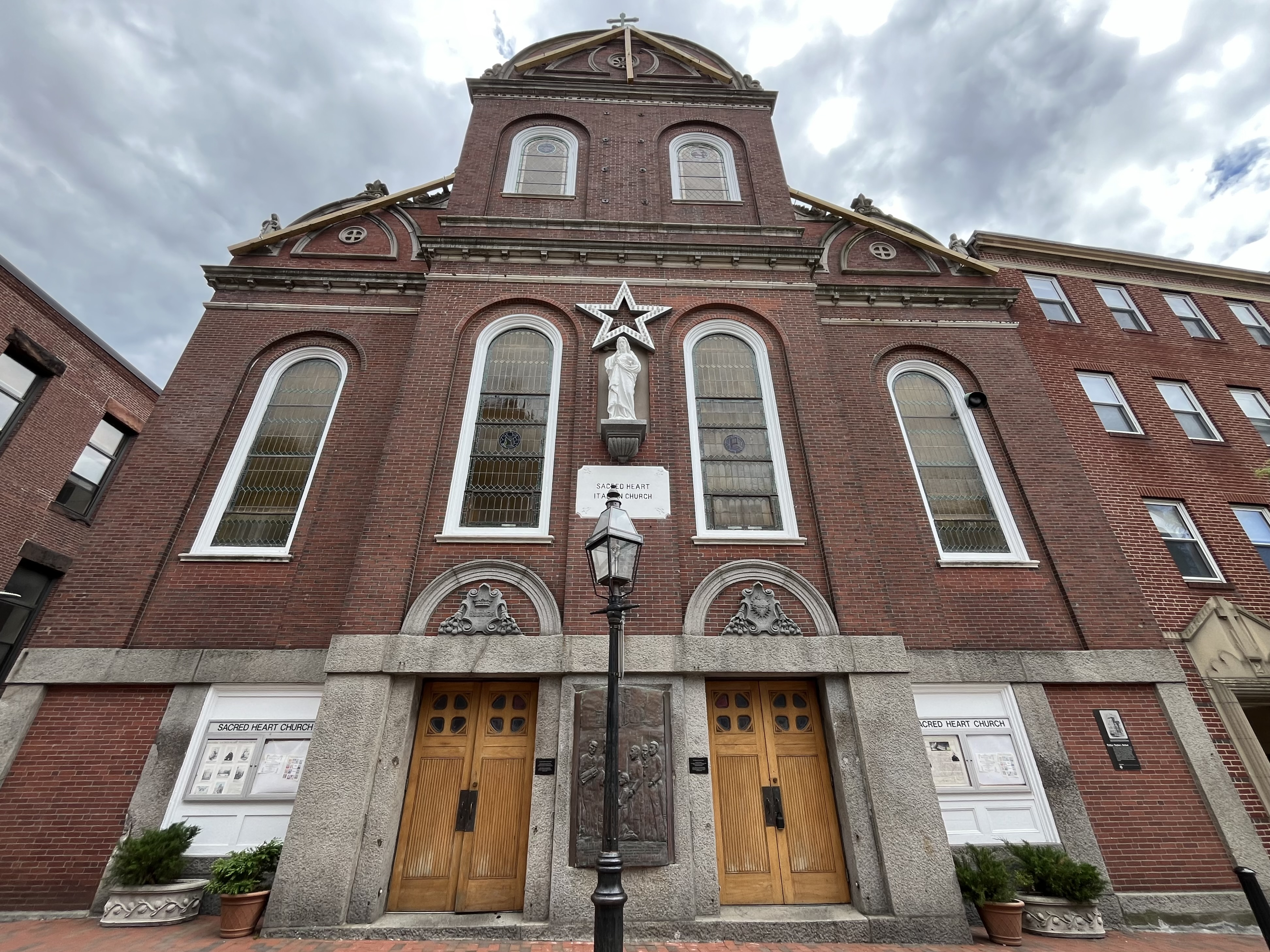
- Sacred Heart Church
- 42°21′49″N 71°03′11″W
- Location: 12 North Square, Boston, Massachusetts, U.S.
- Country: United States
- Denomination: Roman Catholic
- Website: SaintLeonardChurchBoston.com

History
- Founded: 1888

Administration
- Province: Boston
- Diocese: Archdiocese of Boston
- Parish: St. Leonard of Port Maurice Parish

Clergy
- Archbishop: Cardinal Seán Patrick O'Malley
- Pastor: Fr. Michael Della Pena

The Seamen's Bethel in Boston was a Methodist church whose pastor was the famous preacher Edward Thompson Taylor. The building was purchased by Italian immigrants and became the Sacred Heart Church in 1888.

== History ==
In 1829, a group of Boston Methodists formed the Port Society of Boston to provide charitable aid and religious services for the city's sailors. They acquired the vacant Methodist Alley chapel located in the North End, which was the heart of Boston's shipping industry. The Port Society renamed the chapel the Seamen's Bethel, and at the end of the year Edward Thompson Taylor was hired as Mariner's Preacher. The chapel in Methodist Alley proved too small for the growing congregation, and a new church was built at 12 North Square in 1833.

The new building was purchased by the Saint Mark Society, a group of Italian immigrants, in 1884, and was named Sacred Heart by Archbishop Williams in 1888. The church was ministered to by the Scalabrini Fathers from its opening in 1889 until 2004. It is now part of St. Leonard of Port Maurice Parish, and is staffed by the Franciscan Fathers.

This church is currently under study for landmark status by the Boston Landmarks Commission.

== See also ==
- History of Italian Americans in Boston
