= Edward Thompson Taylor =

American Methodist clergyman

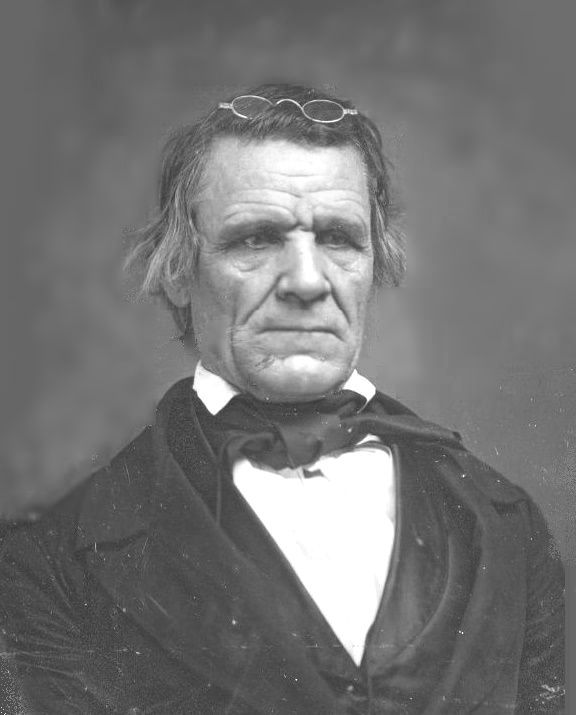

Personal details
- Born: December 25, 1793 Richmond, Virginia
- Died: April 6, 1871 (aged 77) Boston, Massachusetts
- Buried: Mount Hope Cemetery, Mattapan, Massachusetts
- Denomination: Methodist
- Residence: Boston, Massachusetts
- Spouse: Deborah D. Millett

Edward Thompson Taylor (December 25, 1793–April 6, 1871) was an American Methodist minister. He joined the New England Annual Conference of the Methodist Episcopal Church in 1819 and was an itinerant preacher in southeastern New England for 10 years. In 1829, the Port Society of Boston hired Taylor to be the chaplain of the Seamen’s Bethel, a mission to sailors. In Boston, "Father Taylor" became famous as an eloquent and colorful preacher, a sailors' advocate, and a temperance activist.

== Early life ==
Edward T. Taylor was born near Richmond, Virginia, on December 25, 1793, but he never knew his parents. He was raised by a foster mother about whom he seems to have remembered very little. He ran away from home at the age of seven to begin a career as a sailor. In 1811 he came to the port of Boston, Massachusetts. There, he heard a sermon by Edward D. Griffin at the Park Street Church and exclaimed, "Why can't I preach so? I'll try it."

== Sailor and preacher ==
During the War of 1812, Taylor shipped aboard the privateer Curlew, which was captured by the British ship Acasta and its crew held at Melville Island. Not taking to the prayers for the King read by the prison chaplain, Taylor's fellow prisoners asked the prison commandant to allow him to lead worship services in the prison.

After his release from Halifax, Taylor returned to Boston and attended the Bromfield Street Methodist Church. He was licensed as a lay preacher in 1813 and took a job driving a horse and cart for a Boston store, traveling through the countryside to sell tinware and rags. After a year or two, he settled in Saugus, Massachusetts, living in the home of a pious widow. The widow paid Taylor to work her small farm by teaching him how to read. He began holding prayer meetings and services in the widow's house; when his audiences grew, he moved his services to a schoolhouse in East Saugus. Solomon Brown, a local shoemaker who was also a Methodist deacon, became Taylor's supporter. In 1817, Amos Binney, Commandant of the Boston Navy Yard and a prominent Methodist layman, recommended that Taylor receive formal training. He sent Taylor to Wesleyan Academy in Newmarket, New Hampshire.

Taylor left Wesleyan Academy after about six weeks. In 1818, George Pickering, Taylor’s Methodist presiding elder, sent him to preach in Marblehead, Massachusetts. There he met a pious local woman, Deborah D. Millett, whom he married in 1819.

That same year, Taylor was ordained as a minister and assigned to preach in Scituate, Massachusetts, and neighboring towns. In the spring of 1820, he joined a Masonic lodge in Duxbury. He remained a loyal Mason for the rest of his life.

Taylor preached in the Harwich, Massachusetts, area in 1821 and 1822. He was assigned to New Bedford in 1823 and to Martha's Vineyard in 1824. In 1825 he preached in the mill towns around Milford. He was assigned to Bristol and Warren, Rhode Island, in 1826. He preached in Fall River, Massachusetts, in 1827 and 1828.

Most of Taylor's assignments were in coastal towns and seaports, and a significant portion of his parishioners were sailors or maritime workers. Having been a sailor himself, Taylor was particularly effective at preaching to maritime audiences. Alcohol use was a problem in the maritime world, and Taylor preached and counseled temperance to all his listeners. At the same time that he was serving the seafaring and mill towns of southeastern New England, Taylor was a popular preacher at summer camp meetings. By 1828, he had earned a reputation as a skillful and eloquent sailors’ minister and temperance speaker.

== Later ministry ==
In 1829, a group of Boston Methodists formed the Port Society of Boston to provide charitable assistance to, and religious services for, the city’s sailors. They acquired the vacant Methodist Alley Chapel located in the North End, which was the heart of Boston’s shipping industry. The Port Society renamed the chapel the Seamen's Bethel, and at the end of the year Taylor was hired as Mariner's Preacher.

Taylor and his wife moved to the North End of Boston. By 1829 they had two daughters: Dora (who married Augustine C. Taft and later Levi Brigham) and Harriet (who married John O. Bradford). Three more children would be born to them in Boston: Mary Ellen (who married Thomas Russell), Eliza (who married John W.F. Barnes), and Edward.

In 1832, the Port Society was in financial difficulty. Several Boston merchants, primarily Unitarians, pledged to provide financial assistance, and they arranged to build a new and bigger chapel. The new Seamen's Bethel was completed in 1833. While the Bethel was being built, Taylor sailed on a tour of the Mediterranean. In his absence, the magazine editor Sarah Josepha Hale founded the Seaman's Aid Society, a women's charitable organization that assisted the Seamen's Bethel and supported sailors' wives and families. In 1847, Taylor and the Seaman's Aid Society opened the Mariners House, a temperance boarding house for sailors.

The Seamen's Bethel was a nondenominational chapel and Taylor himself was a strong supporter of religious tolerance. Because so many Unitarians supported his ministry, Taylor was appreciative of Unitarian charity and relief work. He worked with, and was admired by, several Unitarian ministers, notably Henry Ware Jr.; William Ellery Channing; Ralph Waldo Emerson; James Freeman Clarke; Robert C. Waterston; and Cyrus A. Bartol.

In 1842, Charles Dickens visited Boston and went to the Seamen's Bethel to hear Taylor preach. In 1847, Taylor served as chaplain of the frigate Macedonian, which provided relief to Ireland during the famine. In the 1850s, the beloved singer Jenny Lind went to the Seamen's Bethel when she was in Boston.

Taylor became one of Boston's most popular and best-known preachers, and he was known everywhere as "Father Taylor". The Boston orator and statesman Edward Everett said Taylor was a "walking Bethel". A contemporary encyclopedia noted that he "mingled nautical terms and figures in his discourses, and by his wit, pathos, and imagination controlled the moods and wrought upon the feelings of his hearers in a remarkable degree." The notable Unitarian minister Henry W. Bellows said of Taylor: "There was no pulpit in Boston around which the lovers of genius and eloquence gathered so often, or from such different quarters, as that in the Bethel at the remote North End, where Father Taylor preached. ... He was, perhaps, the most original preacher, and one of the most effective pulpit and platform orators, America has produced."

Dickens was not the only writer who was interested in Taylor. Ralph Waldo Emerson said, "How puny, how cowardly, other preachers look by the side of this preaching! He shows us what a man can do." Walt Whitman said of Taylor, "I have never heard but one essentially perfect orator." Taylor may have served as a model for Father Mapple in the 1851 Herman Melville novel Moby-Dick.

The European writers Harriet Martineau, Anna Jameson,, Fredrika Bremer and James Silk Buckingham also heard Taylor preach and included him in their American travel books.

Taylor retired from the pulpit in January 1868. He died on April 6, 1871. He and his wife Deborah are buried at Mount Hope Cemetery in Mattapan, Massachusetts.

== Sources ==
- Haven, Gilbert; Russell, Thomas (1871). Father Taylor, the sailor preacher; incidents and anecdotes of Rev. Edward T. Taylor. New York : Hunt & Eaton, Cincinnati, Cranston & Stowe.
- Knickerbocker, Wendy (2014). Bard of the Bethel: The Life and Times of Boston's Father Taylor, 1793-1871. Cambridge Scholars Publishing. ISBN 978-1-4438-6232-5.
- Kverndal, Roald (1986). Seamen's missions : their origin and early growth. Pasadena, Calif.: William Carey Library. ISBN 978-0-87808-4401.
- Starr, Harris Elwood (1936). Malone, Dumas (ed.). Edward Thompson Taylor; Dictionary of American biography. Vol. XVIII. New York: Charles Scribner's Sons.
