= Street Corner Society =

1943 book by William Whyte

- First edition
- Author: William Foote Whyte
- Original title: Street Corner Society: The Social Structure of an Italian Slum
- Subject: Ethnography
- Publisher: University of Chicago Press
- Publication date: 1943
- Pages: 364

Street Corner Society (originally titled Street Corner Society: The Social Structure of an Italian Slum) is an ethnography written by William Foote Whyte and published in 1943. It was Whyte's first book. It received little attention when it was first published, but upon being reissued in 1955 it became a bestseller as well as a standard college text, and established Whyte's reputation as a pioneer in participant observation.

== Background ==
In the late 1930s, on a fellowship from Harvard University, Whyte lived in the North End of Boston, which was mostly inhabited by first- and second-generation immigrants from Italy. Whyte, who came from a well-to-do family, considered the neighborhood a slum, and wanted to learn more about its "lower class" society. Whyte lived in that district for three and a half years, including 18 months he spent with an Italian family. Through this work, Whyte became a pioneer in participant observation (which he called "participant observer research").

== Overview ==
Street Corner Society describes various groups and communities within the district. Compaesani – people originally from the same Italian town – are one example. The first part of the book contains detailed accounts of how local gangs were formed and organized. Whyte differentiated between "corner boys" and "college boys": The lives of the "corner boys" revolved around particular street corners and the nearby shops. Conversely, the "college boys" were more interested in good education and moving up the social ladder.

The second part of the book describes the relations of social structure, politics, and racketeering in that district. It is also a testament to the importance of WPA jobs at the time.

== Reception ==
The book was first published as Street Corner Society: The Social Structure of an Italian Slum by the University of Chicago Press in 1943. It received little attention at the time, but when it was republished in 1955 it garnered critical praise and became a bestseller and a standard college text. It has since been translated into at least six different languages and reprinted in many editions.

Not all the reviews have been positive. The book was not popular in the North End, and Whyte's description of the neighborhood as a "slum" has been called into question. Former Boston city councilman Frederick C. Langone, who lived in the North End and knew Whyte personally, believed Whyte had mischaracterized the neighborhood:

What his book did to the North End was to make it look like everybody was in some kind of racket....In fact, the exact opposite was true....William Whyte's book Street Corner Society was required reading in every college. Consequently, students got the wrong perception of the North End and the Italian-American inhabitants.

== See also ==
- Slumming
- Italian Americans in Boston
