= Mimie Pitaro =

American politician

Msgr. Mimie B. Pitaro (May 3, 1916 - September 3, 1995) was an American priest from the Roman Catholic Archdiocese of Boston and politician.

== Career ==
He was the pastor of Most Holy Redeemer parish in East Boston and the first Roman Catholic priest elected to the Great and General Court of Massachusetts. As a state representative from 1970 to 1972 and president of the East Boston Neighborhood Council, he fought against the expansion of Logan Airport, was instrumental in getting the Boston Redevelopment Agency to build an elderly housing development instead of the waterfront motel it had planned, and worked in the hospice movement. His Boston Globe obituary called him a "a doughty fighter for powerless people."
