= Upham's Corner Market =

- U.S. National Register of Historic Places
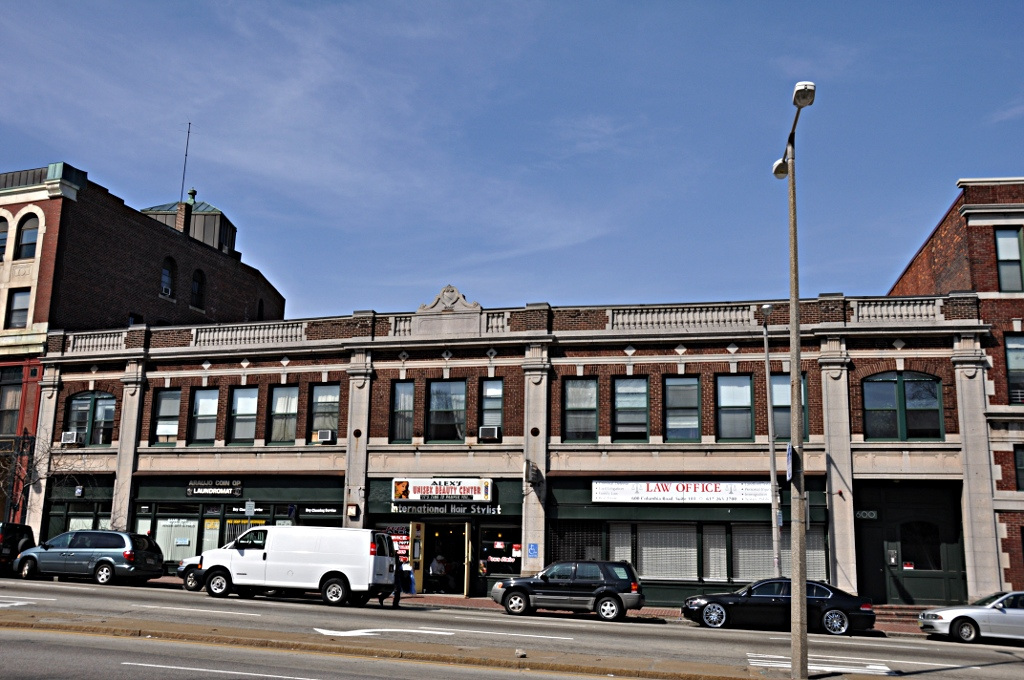

- Location within Massachusetts Location within the United States
- Location: Boston, Massachusetts
- Coordinates: 42°19′2.8″N 71°3′53.4″W
- Built: 1919
- Architect: Bacon, Willard M.
- Architectural style: Classical Revival, Tudor Revival, Other
- NRHP reference No.: 90001537
- Added to NRHP: October 11, 1990

The Upham's Corner Market is an historic commercial building at 600 Columbia Road in the Dorchester neighborhood of Boston, Massachusetts. It is actually three separate buildings built c. 1919, 1923, and 1926. They were built by brothers John and Paul Cifrino, who were Italian immigrants. They established a small neighborhood grocery store in 1915, before building this series of buildings to house what became an early supermarket. After the third section was built, the store had 50,000 square feet (4,600 m^{2}) of space, and was the largest store of its kind in the city, serving a nearby population of more than 250,000. The buildings have been converted to mixed commercial and residential use.

The building was listed on the National Register of Historic Places in 1990.

== See also ==
- National Register of Historic Places listings in southern Boston, Massachusetts
