= William Foote Whyte =

American sociologist (1914–2000)

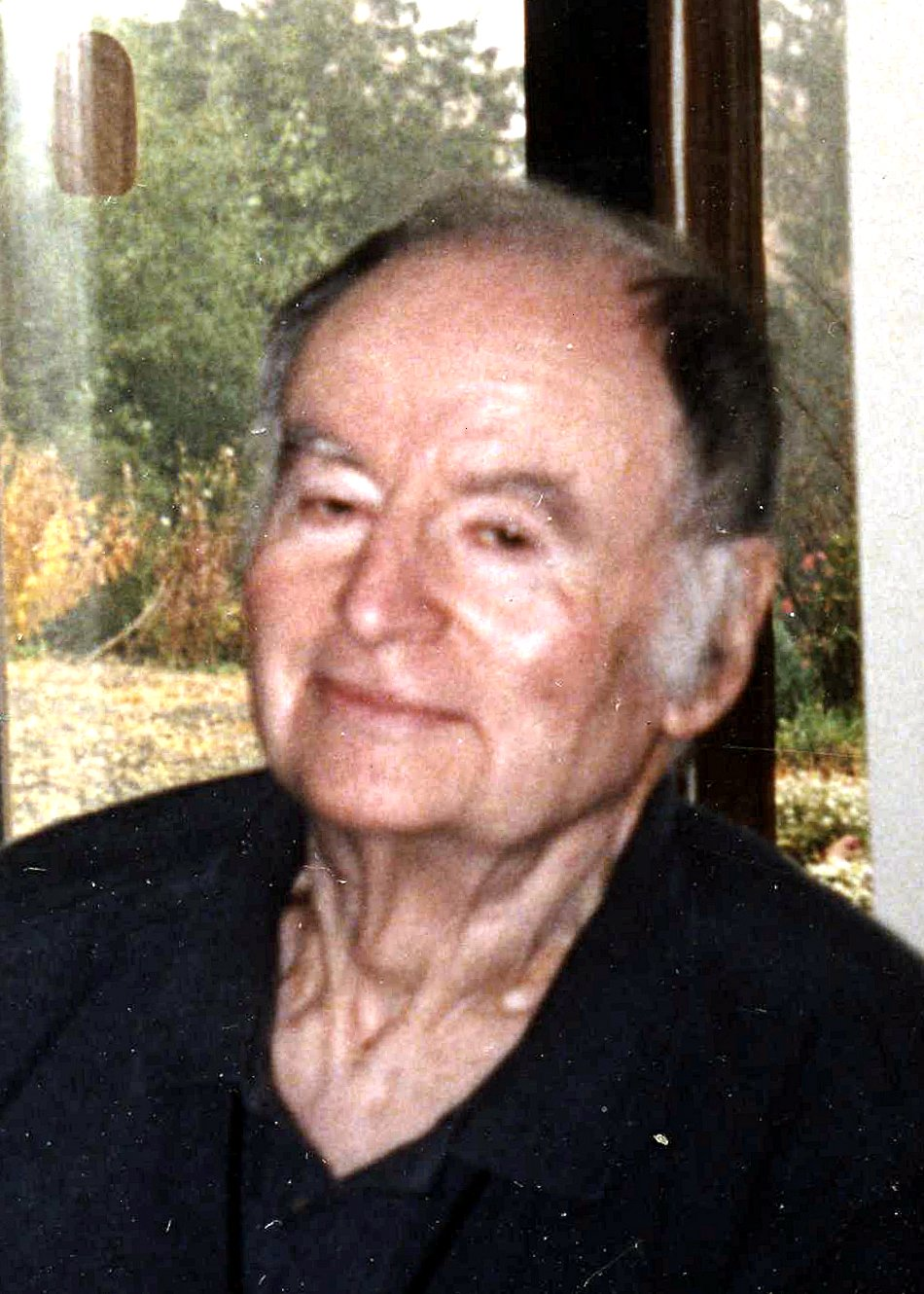
William Foote Whyte at home in Lansing, New York, 1996.

William Foote Whyte (June 27, 1914 – July 16, 2000) was an American sociologist chiefly known for his ethnographic study in urban sociology, Street Corner Society. A proponent of participant observation, he lived for four years in an Italian community in Boston while a Junior Fellow at Harvard researching social relations of street gangs in Boston's North End.

== Early life ==
Whyte, from an upper-middle-class background, showed an early interest in writing, economics and social reform. After graduating from Swarthmore College, he was selected for the Junior Fellows program, where his landmark research was done. After his research in Boston, he entered the sociology doctoral program at the University of Chicago. Street Corner Society was published by the University of Chicago Press in 1943. He spent a year teaching at the University of Oklahoma, but developed polio in 1943 and spent two years in physical therapy at the Warm Springs Foundation. Rehabilitation was only partially successful; Whyte walked with a cane for the rest of his life, and used two arm crutches in his later years.

== Professional career ==
He briefly returned to the University of Chicago in 1944, then joined the New York State School of Industrial and Labor Relations at Cornell University in 1948, remaining at Cornell for the remainder of his career. At Cornell he supervised Chris Argyris with his doctorate. He worked for social reform and social change, directing his efforts toward "empowering the disenfranchized and narrowing the gap between rich and poor." He studied industrial and agricultural workers and workers' cooperatives in Venezuela, Peru, Guatemala and in the Basque region of Spain, as well as in the United States. He authored hundreds of articles and 20 books including an autobiography. He is considered a pioneer in industrial sociology.

== Family ==
At his death William F. Whyte was survived by his wife, Kathleen (King) Whyte, his sons Martin King Whyte and John Whyte, and his daughters Joyce Wiza and Lucy Whyte Ferguson.

== Education ==
Professor Whyte received his bachelor's degree in economics from Swarthmore College in 1936, and was selected for the Junior Fellows program at Harvard University, where his landmark research was done. After his research in Boston, he entered the sociology doctoral program at the University of Chicago.

== Association ==
Whyte served as the president of the American Sociological Association in 1981 and also of the Society for Applied Anthropology in 1964.
