= Rüdiger Gamm =

German mental calculator

Rüdiger Gamm (born 10 July 1971) is a German "mental calculator". He attained the ability to mentally evaluate large arithmetic expressions at the age of 21. He can also speak backwards, and calculate calendars. Featured on the Discovery Channel program The Real Superhumans, he was examined by Allan Snyder, an expert on savants, who concluded that Gamm's ability was not a result of savant syndrome but connected to genetics.

In terms of mental calculations, Rüdiger's most notable talent is the ability to memorize large powers. In the 2008 Mental Calculation World Cup in Leipzig, he recited 81^{100}, which took approximately 2 minutes and 30 seconds. In the tournament itself, he performed strongly, finishing in 5th position overall. He also held a seminar in 2012 at the BOLDTalks event at DUCTAC (Dubai).

== Early life ==
Rüdiger Gamm was born on 10 July 1971 in Welzheim, Germany. Gamm stated that he learnt how to speak backwards before learning how to speak forwards which prompted classmates to tease him or avoid him. Gamm was a self-proclaimed underachiever at school and stated "I was the worst in my class at maths. I failed my exam six times and hated school a lot. The only thing I was interested in was bodybuilding. I wanted to be like Arnold Schwarzenegger, rather than a mathematician." Gamm recalls, shortly after leaving college, listening to the radio and calculating alongside a champion mathematician. After Gamm answered the calculations faster than the champion, he started training his brain into the field of mental math and, a year later, appeared on the German TV game show Wetten, dass..? (in the United States it is known as Wanna Bet? and in the United Kingdom known as You Bet!.) Gamm won the show with the highest score achieved and received a prize of 8,400 Deutsche Marks.
