= Gerald Gamm =

Gerald H. Gamm (born c. 1964) is a professor of political science and history at the University of Rochester. He served for 12 years as chair of the political science department. Currently, his research focuses on Congress, state legislatures, and urban politics. Gamm is the author of two books: The Making of New Deal Democrats (University of Chicago Press, 1989), and Urban Exodus: Why the Jews Left Boston and the Catholics Stayed (Harvard University Press, 1999).

Gamm grew up in Sharon, Massachusetts. He earned his A.B. from Harvard, summa cum laude, in 1986, and obtained his Ph.D. in history and political science there in 1994. Gamm joined the Rochester faculty in 1992.

Gamm was a fellow at the Woodrow Wilson International Center for Scholars from 1996 to 1997, and in 1998 he was a recipient of the Goergen Award for Distinguished Achievement and Artistry in Undergraduate Teaching from the University of Rochester. He was elected a corresponding fellow of the Massachusetts Historical Society in 1999. Gamm also won the American Political Science Association's award for the best dissertation on urban politics for his 1994 dissertation, Neighborhood Roots: Exodus and Stability in Boston, 1870-1990. In 2000, his book Urban Exodus received the Robert E. Peck award of the American Sociological Association for the most distinguished book in urban and community sociology, and in 2001 this book received the Tuttleman Foundation Book Award, presented by Gratz College, for "the outstanding book on Jewish life in contemporary America." In 2007 and 2008, Gamm and Kousser won awards from the State Politics and Policy Section of the American Political Science Association for papers presented at the previous year's annual meeting.

== Selected works ==
- Gamm, Gerald & Kousser, Thad (2010). Broad Bills or Particularistic Policy? Historical Patterns in American State Legislatures. American Political Science Review, 104, 151–170.
- Burns, Nancy, Evans, Laura, Gamm, Gerald & McConnaughy, Corrine (2009). Urban Politics in the State Arena. Studies in American Political Development, 23, 1-22.
- Burns, Nancy, Evans, Laura, Gamm, Gerald & McConnaughy, Corrine (2008). Pockets of Expertise: Institutional Capacity in Twentieth-Century State Legislatures. Studies in American Political Development, 22, 229–248.
- Gamm, Gerald & Putnam, Robert D. (1999). The Growth of Voluntary Associations in America, 1840–1940. Journal of Interdisciplinary History, 29, 511–557.
- Allard, Scott, Burns, Nancy & Gamm, Gerald (1998). Representing Urban Interests: The Local Politics of State Legislatures. Studies in American Political Development, 12, 267–302.
- Burns, N. & Gamm, G. (1997). Creatures of the State: State Politics and Local Government, 1871–1921. Urban Affairs Review, 33, 59–96.
- Rosenof, Theodore & Gamm, Gerald H. (1991). The Making of New Deal Democrats: Voting Behavior and Realignment in Boston, 1920–1940. American Historical Review, 96, 629–630.
