= Feast of St. Anthony =

Festival in Boston, Massachusetts, United States

The Feast of St. Anthony is celebrated every year in the North End of Boston, Massachusetts on the weekend of the last Sunday in August. The feast has been celebrated since 1919 when a group of Italians from Montefalcione settled in the North End of Boston. They began a society called the Sant'Antonio Di Padova Montefalcione which devoted their honor to their patron saint. People come from all across the world to see the decorated streets and parade dedicated to St. Anthony. National Geographic christened St. Anthony’s feast as “The feast of all feasts”. The Italians wanted to keep their heritage strong in America so they continued to celebrate the feast as they did in Italy. In Italy it is common to celebrate festivals and feasts for the Catholic religion, each saint having their own day. This feast includes food and shopping stands, games for children, live performances, and a parade. Additional happenings throughout the feast include: A Filippo Berio (Olive Oil Company) Culinary Pavilion featuring cooking demonstrations the ability to sample food from some of the North End's best eateries, an outdoor Mass in honor of Saint Anthony which includes the veneration and blessing of the Relic of Saint Anthony.

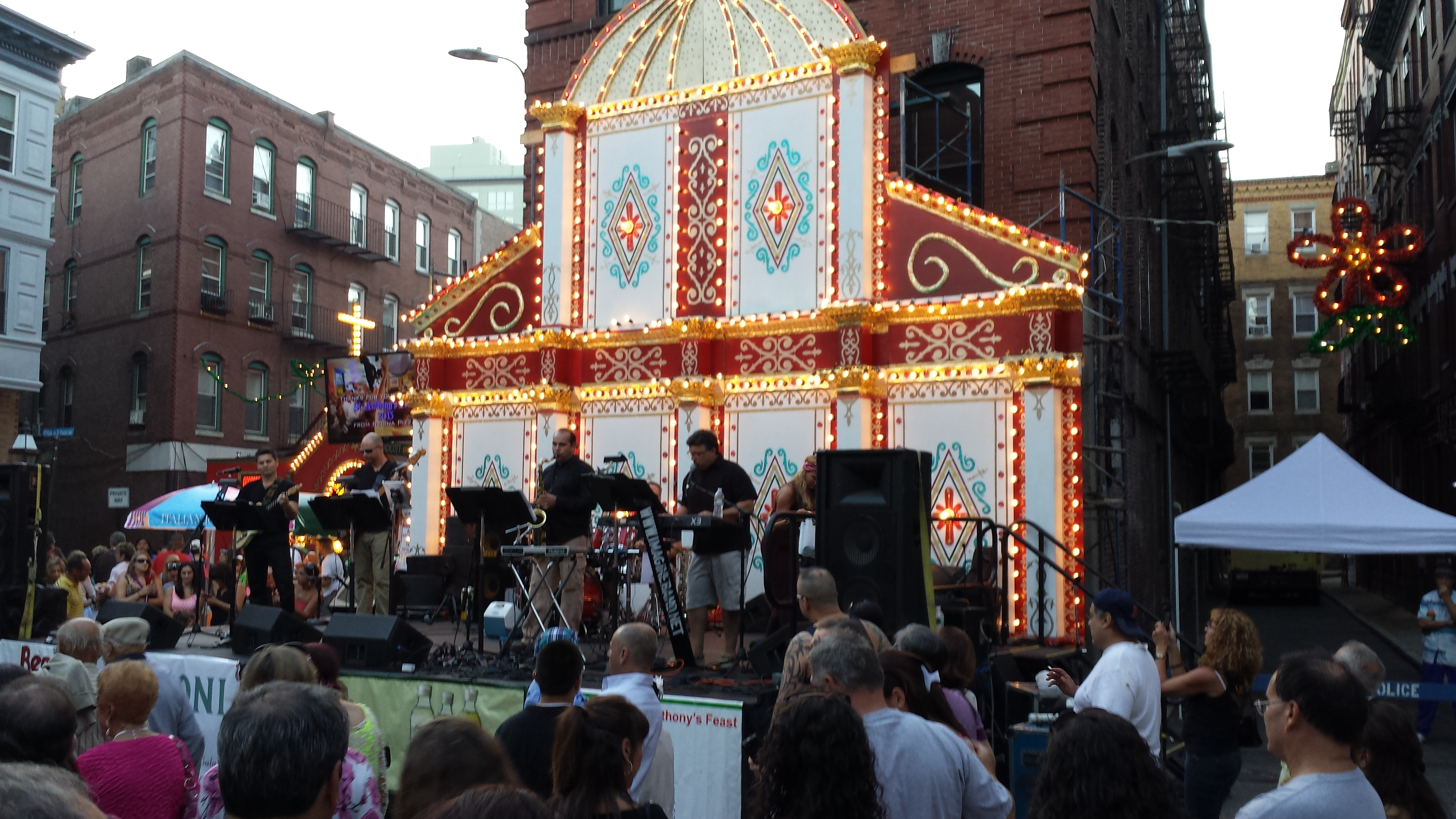
The main stage at the Feast of St. Anthony during the August 2013 Feast.

== Concessions ==
The side streets of the North End are filled with 100 different push carts including food, such as arancini, sausage, peppers and onion, quahogs, calamari, pizza, pasta, and of course zeppole, cannoli and gelato. There are also many famous restaurants that people flock to during this feast, such as Pizzeria Regina, Bova's Bakery and Mike's Pastries. People will wait in line for hours to indulge in delicious pastries or a mouth-watering brick oven-made pizza. In addition to these food carts there are also carts for many different shopping items, mostly reflecting the Italian heritage. Stands similar to carnival games are set up for the children, giving this feast something that each member of the family can enjoy.

== Procession of the Saint ==
The main event is a 10-hour-long procession, in which a statue of St. Anthony is carried through the streets of the North End; it is followed by devotees, numerous marching bands, and floats. Throughout the 10-hour-long procession numerous donations are pinned to the statue, in hopes that the saint will answer the donor's prayer as the band performs Marcia Reale.

== See also ==
- Italian Americans in Boston
