= Durgin =

Surname

Durgin is a surname. Notable people with the surname include:

- Bob Durgin (1943–2018), American radio personality
- Calvin T. Durgin (1893–1965), U.S. Navy vice admiral
- Doranna Durgin, American author
- Dorothy Durgin (1825–1898), American teacher and eldress of the Canterbury Shaker community
- Ezra Durgin (1796–1863), American politician
- Harriet Thayer Durgin (1843–1912), American artist
- Lawrence L. Durgin (1918–1981), American Congregational minister and social activist
- Lyle Durgin (1845–1904), American artist
- William B. Durgin Company, an American silversmith

== Other uses ==
- Durgin Bridge, a covered bridge in Sandwich, New Hampshire, U.S.
- Durgin House, a historical building in Reading, Massachusetts, U.S.
- Durgin-Park, a defunct restaurant in Boston, Massachusetts, U.S.
