= Billerica-Wilmington Airport =

- IATA: none; ICAO: none

Summary
- Operator: Private
- Location: Billerica, Massachusetts, Wilmington, Massachusetts
- Built: Unknown
- In use: 1946-1950s
- Occupants: Private
- Elevation AMSL: 135 ft / 41 m
- Coordinates: 42°33′4.56″N 71°12′51.07″W
- Interactive map of Billerica-Wilmington Airport

Billerica-Wilmington Airport was an airfield operational in the mid-20th century in Billerica, Massachusetts and Wilmington, Massachusetts.
