= Sears Cook Walker =

American astronomer (1805–1853)

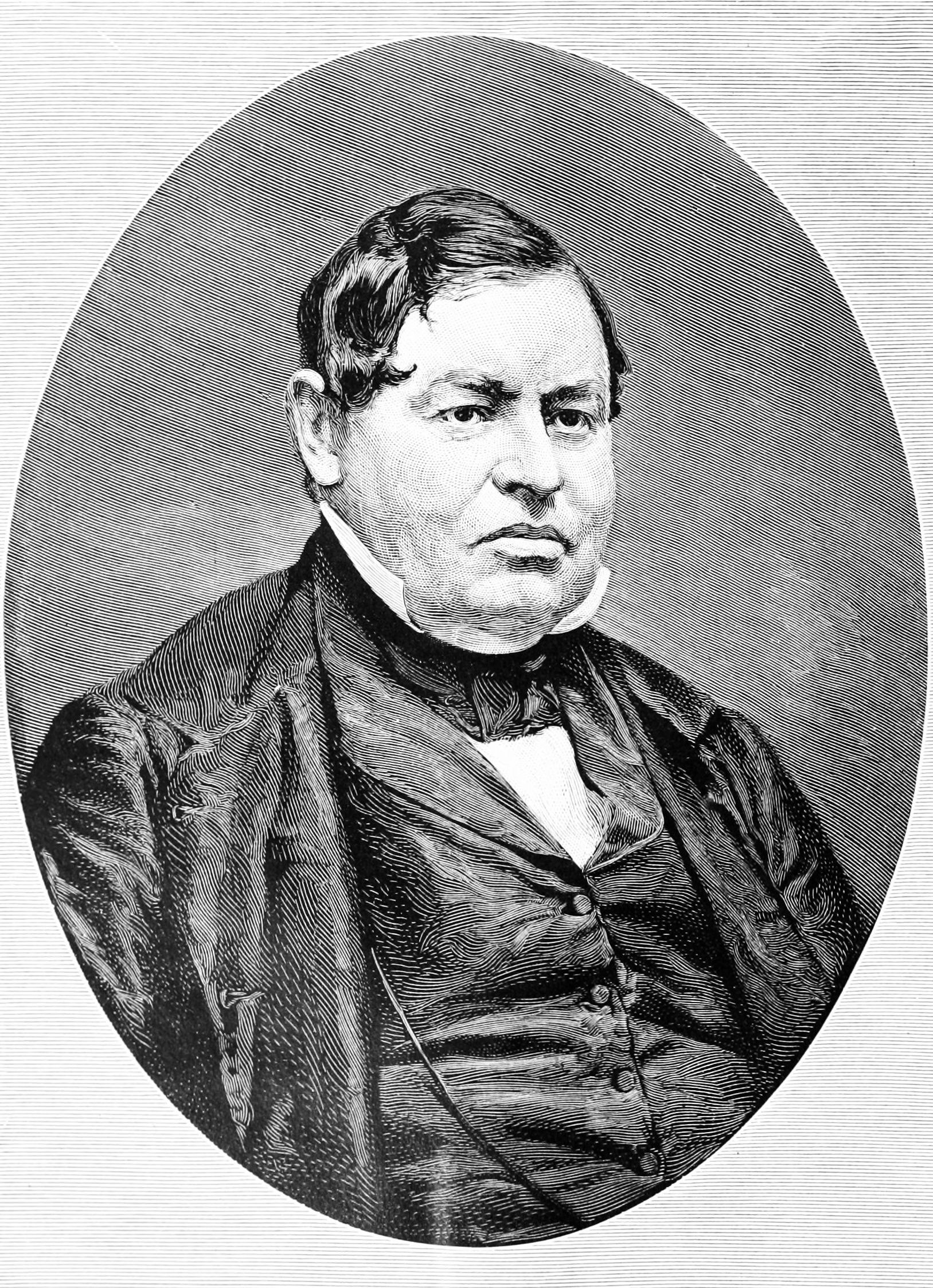
Sears Cook Walker

Sears Cook Walker (March 28, 1805 – January 30, 1853) was an American astronomer.

Born at Wilmington, Massachusetts son of Benjamin Walker and Susanna Cook, he graduated from Harvard University in 1825, he was a teacher till 1835, was an actuary in 1835-1845 for the Pennsylvania Company for Insurance on Lives and Granting Annuities, and then became one of several assistants at the United States Naval Observatory following orders from Superintendent Matthew Fontaine Maury. Sears C. Walker was fired by Maury for publishing United States Naval Observatory findings on the planet Neptune in a foreign nation's scientific news through the help of Joseph Henry of the Smithsonian Institution. However, it was too late, and Walker got personal credit for work that he was only partially involved in. In 1847 he took charge of the longitude department of the United States Coast Survey, where he was among the first to make use of the electric telegraph for the purpose of determining the difference of longitude between two stations, and he introduced the method of registering transit observations electrically by means of a chronograph. He also investigated the orbit of the newly discovered planet Neptune. He died near Cincinnati in 1853.

Walker learned to read at least seven languages. Using his knowledge of German he read the work of German astronomers. The annotations in his copy of Astronomische Nachrichten show that he was interested in data reduction and computation of orbits. He was elected a member of the American Philosophical Society in 1837.

His brother Timothy Walker (1802–1856) was a leader of the Ohio bar.

== See also ==
- Ezra Otis Kendall
