= First Congregational Church (Detroit) =

Historic church in Michigan, United States

- U.S. National Register of Historic Places
- U.S. Historic district – Contributing property
- Michigan State Historic Site
- First Congregational Church in 2019, photograph by Carol M. Highsmith.
- Interactive map
- Location: 33 East Forest Avenue; Detroit, Michigan
- Coordinates: 42°21′19″N 83°3′46″W
- Built: 1891; 1921 (addition)
- Architect: John Lyman Faxon; Albert Kahn
- Architectural style: Romanesque Revival
- NRHP reference No.: 79001173

Significant dates
- Added to NRHP: June 4, 1979
- Designated MSHS: July 26, 1974

The First Congregational Church is located at 33 East Forest Avenue (on the corner of Forest and Woodward Avenue) in Midtown Detroit, Michigan. It was designated a Michigan State Historic Site in 1974 and listed on the National Register of Historic Places in 1979.

== History ==
The First Congregational Church of Detroit was established on December 25, 1844. Two church buildings were built near the Detroit River. The third building was constructed at the present site in 1891, and was designed by architect John Lyman Faxon. An addition to the church, known as the Angel's Wing, was constructed in 1921 by Albert Kahn.

Gaius Glenn Atkins served twice as minister of the church in the early 20th century.

== Architecture ==
The church is designed in a blend of the Romanesque and Byzantine styles, using rough-hewn, warm red limestone. The Woodward facade has a five-bay loggia, with a parapeted front gable. Above that are rounded windows with tracery framed by a rounded arch. The church also features a 120-foot campanile with many narrow arcades. The church is topped by an 8-foot copper figure of the Archangel Uriel.

The church is patterned after churches found in Venice and Ravenna. The sanctuary, which resembles the lower church of St. Francis of Assisi, boasts carved wood, ceiling portraits, rose windows and sumptuous colors. The interior murals were designed and executed by Lyle Durgin, completed in December, 1891.

== Living museum ==
The church offers exhibits about the historical and architectural aspects of the church, its buildings and activities. Visitors can go on self-guided tours of the historic facilities and buildings.

The church also hosts the Underground Railroad Living Museum, a storytelling simulation of the original Underground Railroad.

== Gallery ==
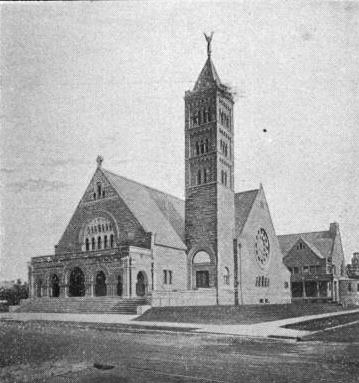
First Congregational Church, c. 1899

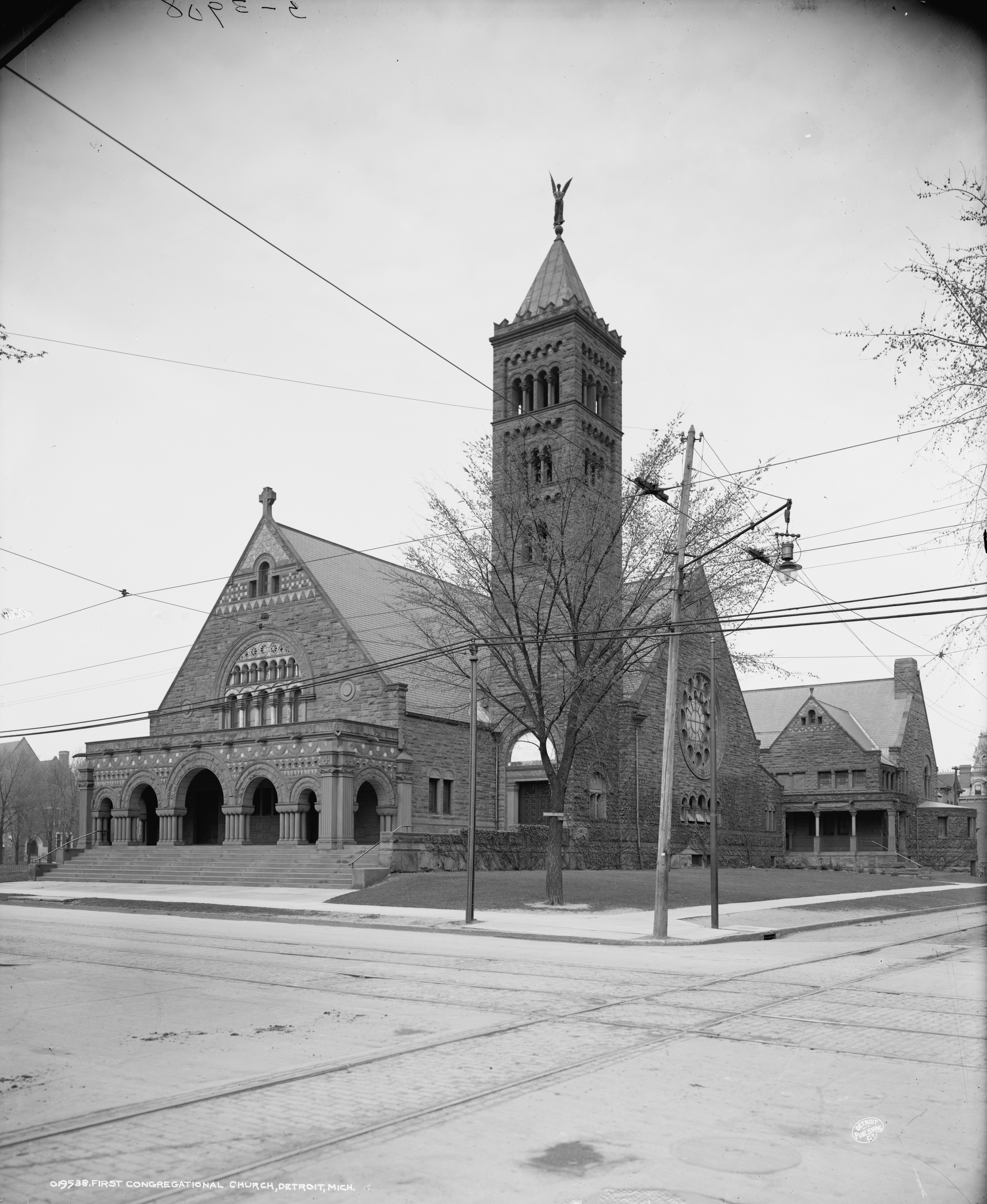
First Congregational Church, c. 1903

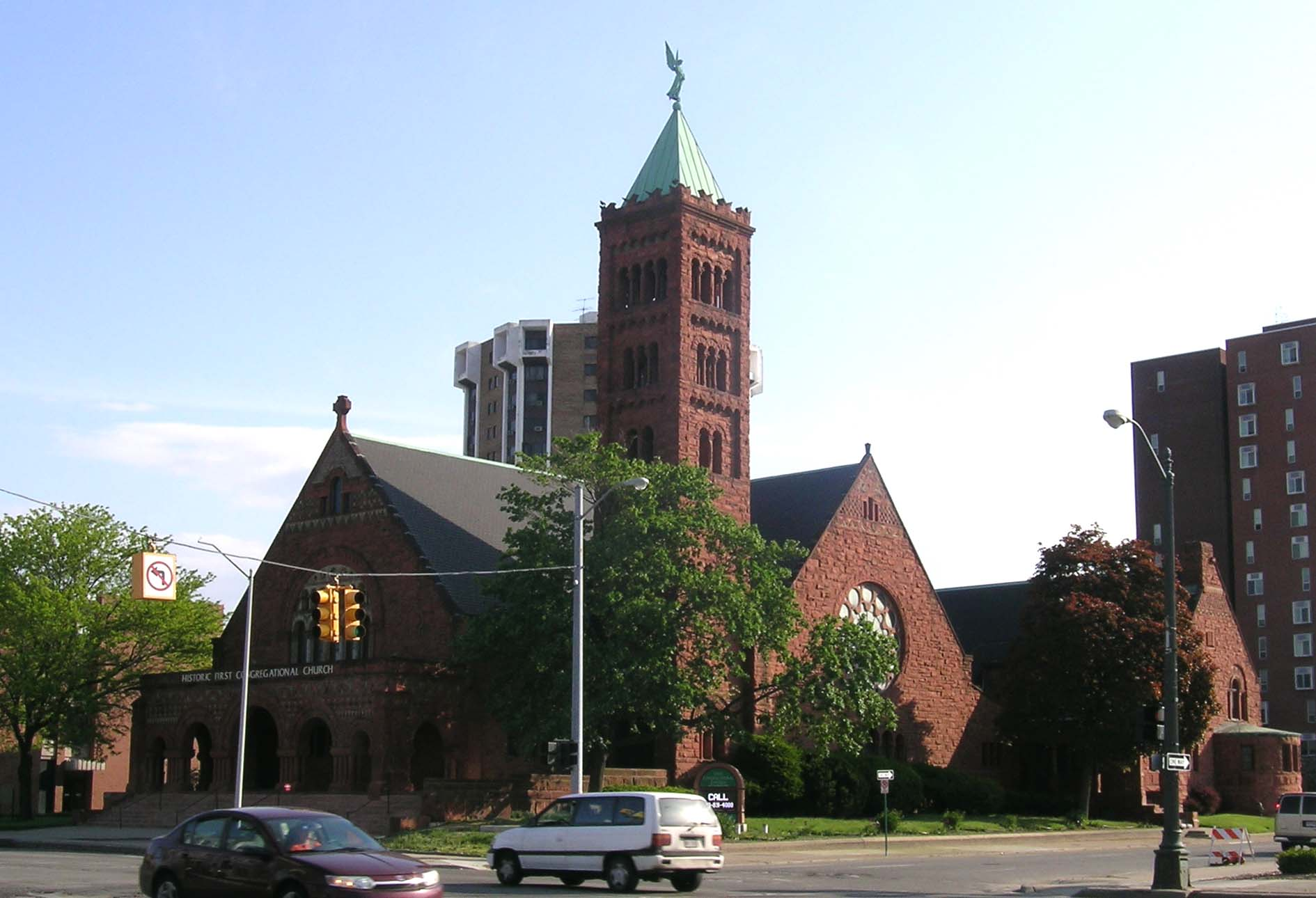
First Congregational Church in 2008

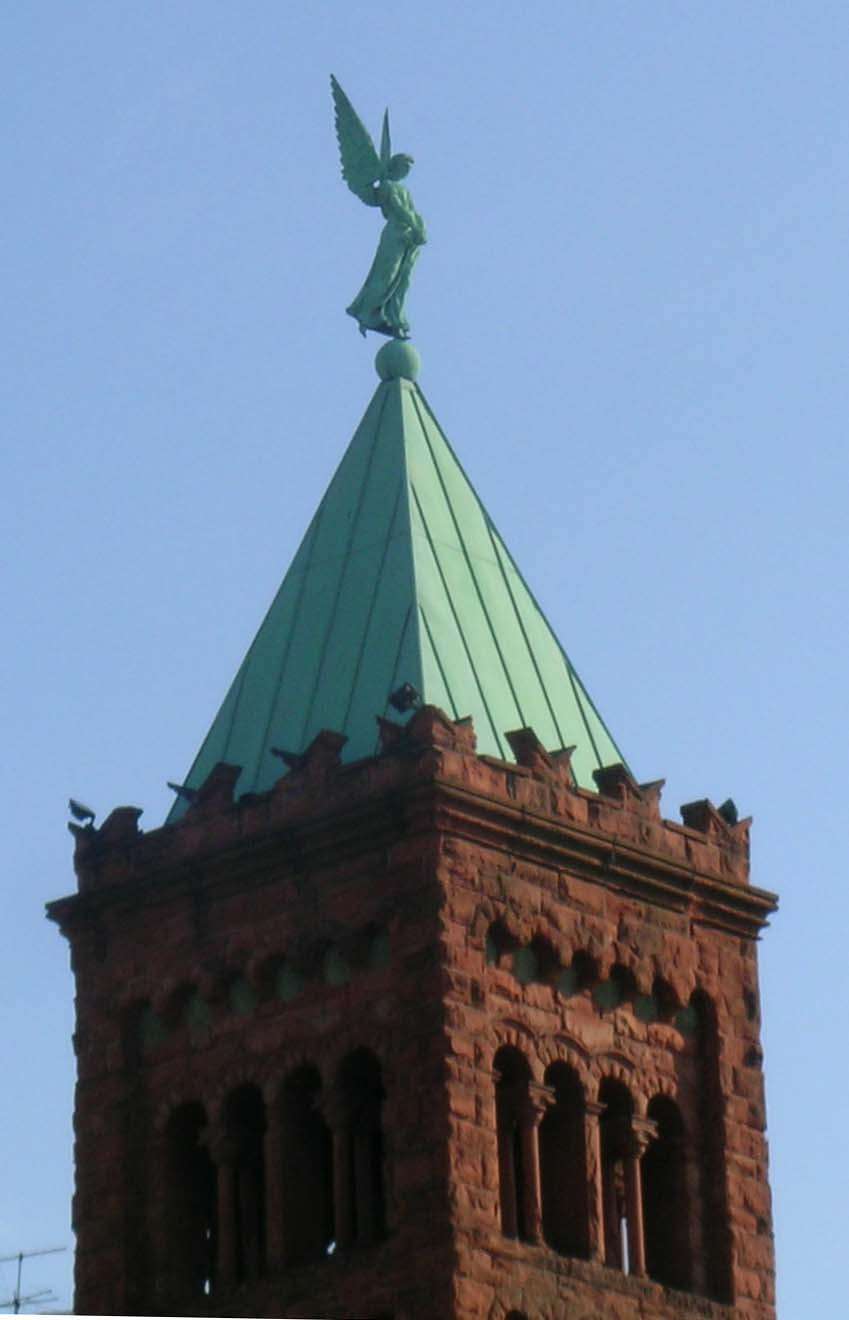
The angel Uriel atop the First Congregational Church
