= First Baptist Church in Newton (Massachusetts) =

Historic church in Massachusetts, United States

- U.S. National Register of Historic Places
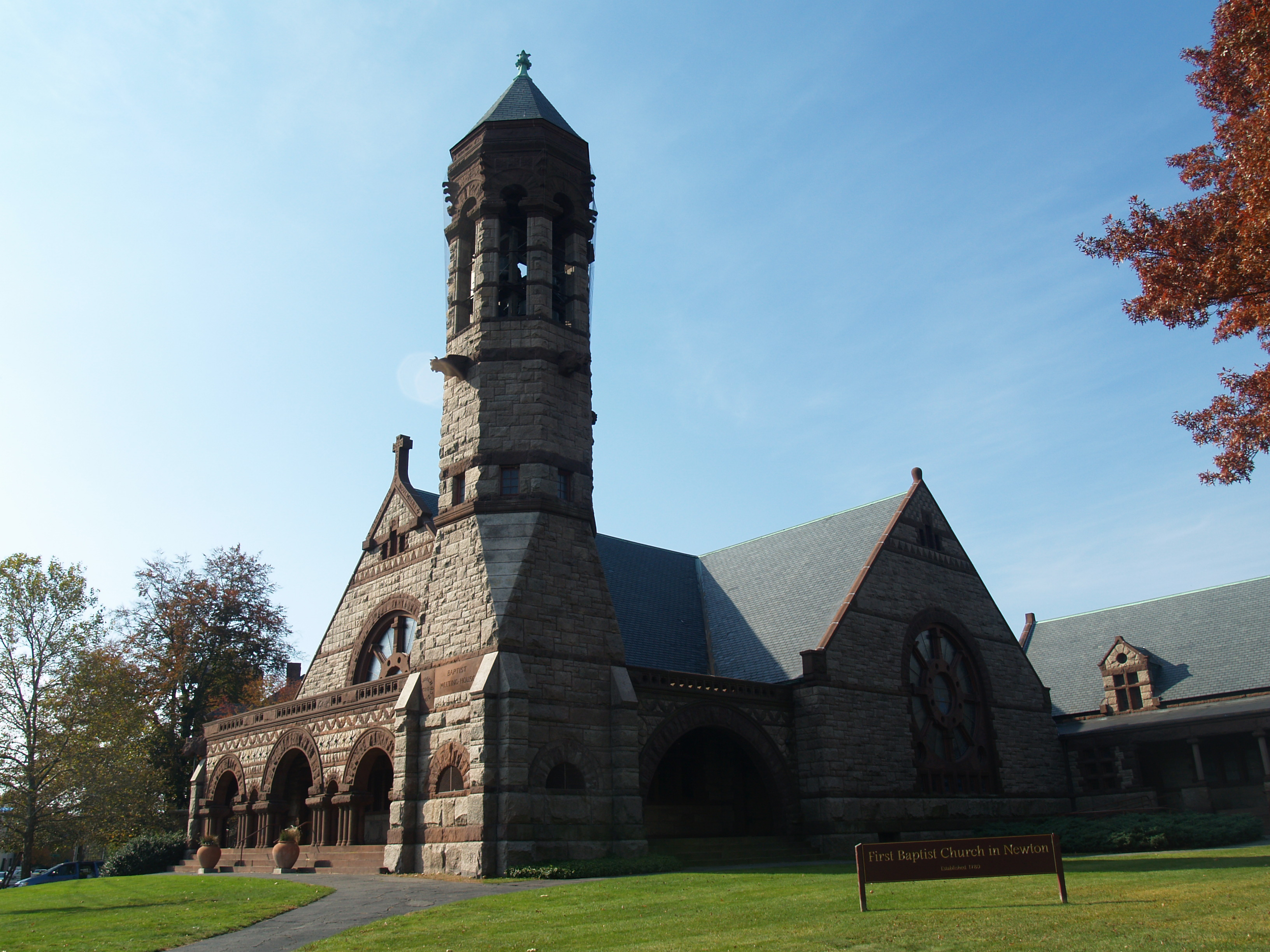
- First Baptist Church in Newton

- Location within Massachusetts Location within the United States
- Location: 848 Beacon St., Newton, Massachusetts
- Coordinates: 42°19′48.2″N 71°11′47.3″W
- Built: 1888
- Architect: John Lyman Faxon
- Architectural style: Romanesque
- NRHP reference No.: 82002746
- Added to NRHP: April 15, 1982

The First Baptist Church in Newton was founded in 1788. Its historic building (built 1888) is located at 848 Beacon Street in the village of Newton Centre, in Newton, Massachusetts. On April 15, 1982, it was listed in the National Register of Historic Places.

== Affiliations ==
As an American Baptist Church, all decisions on church matters rest with its own members. First Baptist Church in Newton is affiliated with the American Baptist Churches USA and a member of The American Baptist Churches of Massachusetts (TABCOM). It also belongs to the Alliance of Baptists and to AWAB, the Association of Welcoming and Affirming Baptists.

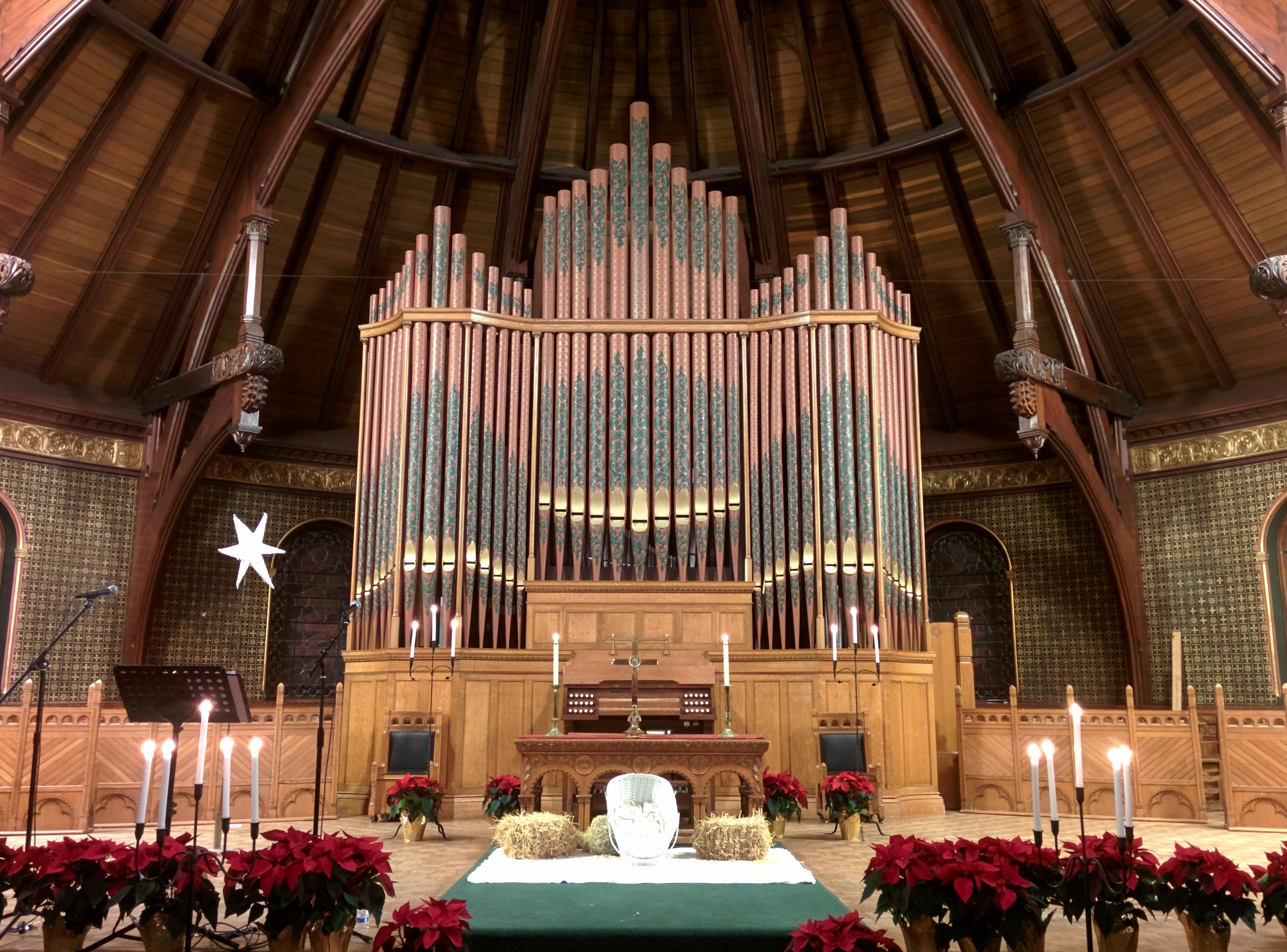
Sanctuary and organ

== History ==
First Baptist Church in Newton was founded on July 5, 1780, on a site just west of the present building. The present building was constructed in 1888 in the Richardsonian Romanesque architectural style pioneered by Henry Hobson Richardson. The church's architect was John Lyman Faxon.

== Famous minister ==
Samuel Francis Smith, famous as the author of My Country, 'Tis of Thee (also known as America), was minister of the church from 1842 to 1854. The bell tower on the present building was given in his memory and was rededicated as the America bell tower in 1932.

== See also ==
- National Register of Historic Places listings in Newton, Massachusetts
