= Silver Lake, Massachusetts =

Silver Lake
- Populated place
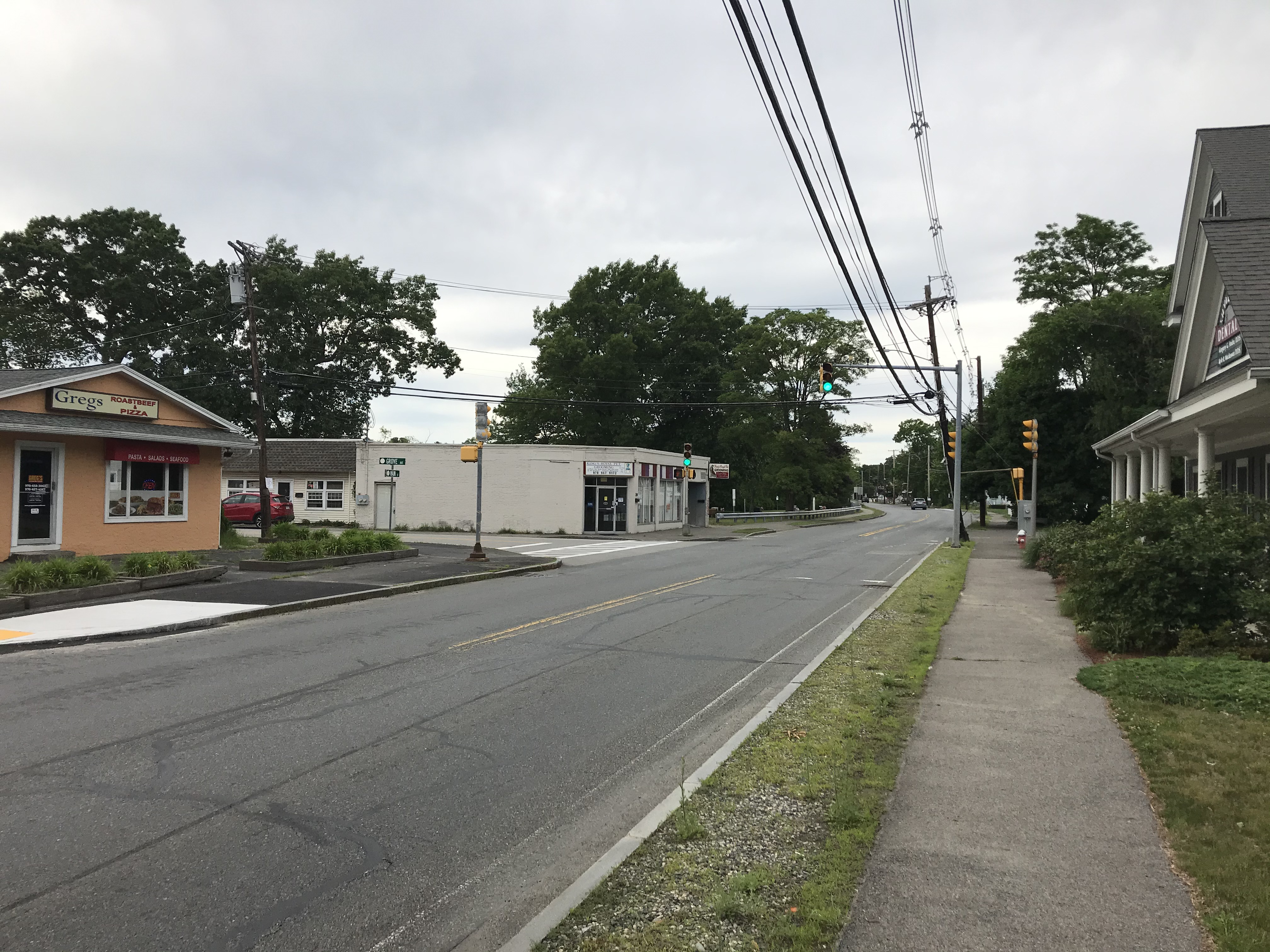
- Main Street
- Nickname: "The Lake"
- Location in Massachusetts
- Coordinates: 42°34′10″N 71°11′28″W
- Country: United States
- State: Massachusetts
- County: Middlesex
- Towns: Wilmington, Tewksbury
- Named for: Silver Lake
- ZIP Codes: 01887, 01876
- Area code: 978

Silver Lake is an unincorporated village in Middlesex County, Massachusetts, in the towns of Wilmington and Tewksbury. It is centered around its namesake lake in Wilmington, Silver Lake. Silver Lake is just off Main Street.

== Points of Interest ==
The shore of the lake features the Town Beach at Silver Lake, as well as Fullerton Park and Landry Park.

A portion of the historic Middlesex Canal runs under Lake Street, and a small pedestrian bridge named Burnap's Bridge is located further up the canal.

Other natural features in the area include a forest named Silver Lake Pines, Lubbers Brook, and Mud Pond.

== Former MBTA station ==
Silver Lake used to contain an MBTA Commuter Rail Lowell Line station, which had service until January 18, 1965. The station building was abandoned around 1943 to reduce the Boston and Maine Railroad tax bill.
