= Wilmington, Massachusetts =

- Town
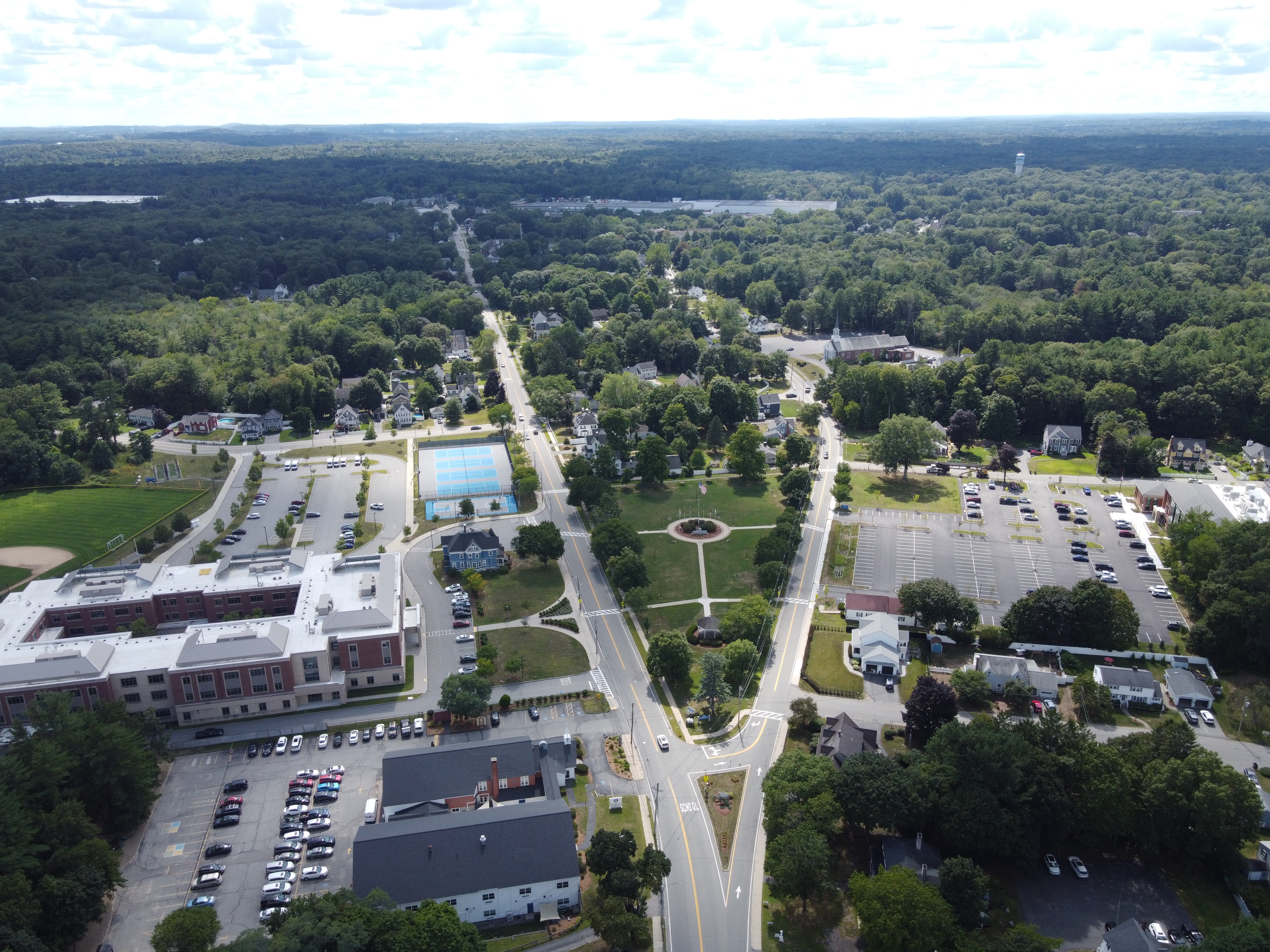
- Wilmington Town Center

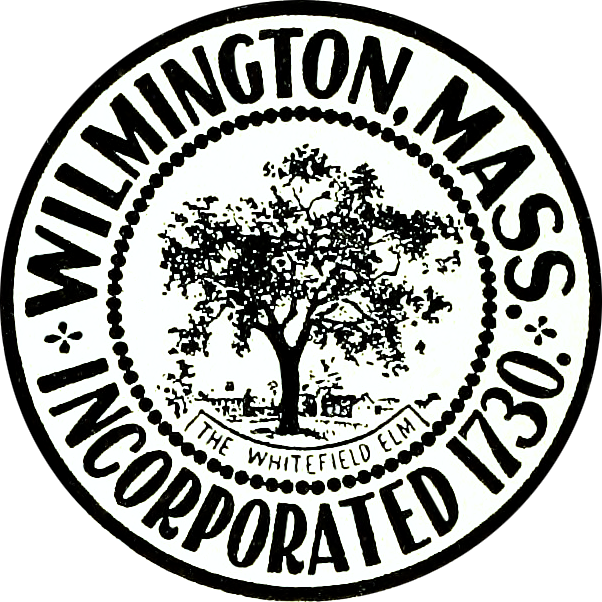
- Seal
- Nickname: Wilmy
- Location in Middlesex County in Massachusetts
- Coordinates: 42°33′N 71°10′W
- Country: United States
- State: Massachusetts
- County: Middlesex
- Region: New England
- Settled: 1665
- Incorporated: 1730
- Named for: Spencer Compton, 1st Earl of Wilmington

Government
  - Type: Open town meeting
  - Town Manager: Eric Slagle

Area
  - Total: 17.2 sq mi (44.6 km^{2})
  - Land: 17.1 sq mi (44.4 km^{2})
  - Water: 0.077 sq mi (0.2 km^{2})
- Elevation: 95 ft (29 m)

Population (2020)
  - Total: 23,349
  - Density: 1,360/sq mi (526/km^{2})
- Time zone: UTC−5 (Eastern)
  - Summer (DST): UTC−4 (Eastern)
- ZIP Code: 01887
- Area code: 978
- FIPS code: 25-80230
- GNIS feature ID: 0618246
- Website: www.wilmingtonma.gov

Wilmington is a town in Middlesex County, Massachusetts, United States. Its population was 23,349 at the 2020 United States census.

== History ==
Wilmington was first settled in 1665 and was officially incorporated in 1730, from parts of Woburn, Reading, and Billerica. The first settlers are believed to have been Will Butter, Richard Harnden or Abraham Jaquith. Butter, a Scottish Covenanter who fought against Oliver Cromwell in the English Civil War, was brought to Woburn as an indentured servant. He achieved his freedom, as did all indentured service, after nine years, then relocated to the opposite side of a large swamp (“the boggy part of Wooburne” “across the river") in what is now Wilmington. Harnden settled in Reading, in an area that is now part of Wilmington. Jaquith settled in an area of Billerica that became part of Wilmington in 1740.

Minutemen from Wilmington responded to the alarm on April 19, 1775, and fought at Merriam's Corner in Concord.

The Middlesex Canal passed through Wilmington. Chartered in 1792, opened in 1803, it provided freight and passenger transport between the Merrimack River and Boston. One important cargo on the canal was hops. From the middle of the 18th century until the early 19th century, Massachusetts was the acknowledged leader in hop production in North America. Middlesex County in particular was famous for its hop yards, and Wilmington was the first place where the culture grew to a fever pitch.

When Lowell was built in the 1820s, the canal became a primary means of transporting cotton to and from the mills. It was abandoned in 1852 after the construction of the Boston and Lowell Railroad.

The Boston and Lowell Railroad was built in 1835. The line is now the oldest operating rail line in the U.S. Wilmington is also served by the Haverhill Division (the old B&M Portland Division). A spur track known as the Wildcat connects the Haverhill and Lowell divisions, following the path of the old Wilmington & Andover Railroad, the corporate ancestor of the Boston & Maine.

Wilmington is where the Baldwin apple was discovered.

Wilmington is also home to the Col. Joshua Harnden Tavern, which probably served as a stop on the Underground Railroad and now houses the Wilmington Town Museum.

Since World War II, Wilmington's population has quadrupled. Interstate 93, Route 62, Route 129 and Route 38 run through town, and Route 128 is about a mile south of Wilmington.

== Geography ==
According to the United States Census Bureau, the CDP has a total area of 17.2 square miles (45 km^{2}), of which 17.1 square miles (44 km^{2}) is land and 0.1 square miles (0.26 km^{2}), or 0.46%, is water.

Wilmington borders the towns of Andover, North Reading, Reading, Woburn, Burlington, Billerica, and Tewksbury. The town is frequently divided into distinct areas, including Silver Lake and North Wilmington.

Much of Wilmington was built on or still is wetlands. The Ipswich River starts in Wilmington, and the Shawsheen River forms part of Wilmington's border with Billerica.

There is one lake in the town, Silver Lake, a kettle lake formed in the retreat of the Pleistocene glaciers at the end of the last ice age. It is open for swimming during the summer.

=== Climate ===
In a typical year, Wilmington, Massachusetts temperatures fall below 50 °F (10 °C) for 195 days per year. Annual precipitation is typically 44.4 inches per year (high in the US) and snow covers the ground 62 days per year, or 17% of the year (high in the US). It may be helpful to understand the yearly precipitation by imagining nine straight days of moderate rain per year. The humidity is below 60% for approximately 25.4 days, or 7% of the year.

== Demographics ==
Historical population
Year	Pop.	±%
1790	710	—
1850	874	+23.1%
1860	919	+5.1%
1870	866	−5.8%
1880	933	+7.7%
1890	1,213	+30.0%
1900	1,596	+31.6%
1910	1,858	+16.4%
1920	2,581	+38.9%
1930	4,013	+55.5%
1940	4,645	+15.7%
1950	7,039	+51.5%
1960	12,475	+77.2%
1970	17,102	+37.1%
1980	17,471	+2.2%
1990	17,651	+1.0%
2000	21,363	+21.0%
2010	22,325	+4.5%
2020	23,349	+4.6%
2024*	23,802	+1.9%
* = population estimate. Source: United States census records and Population Estimates Program data.

The Census Bureau has defined Wilmington as a census-designated place that is equivalent to the town

As of the census of 2000, there were 21,363 people, 7,027 households, and 5,776 families residing in the town. The population density was 1,247.0 inhabitants per square mile (481.5/km^{2}). There were 7,158 housing units at an average density of 417.8 per square mile (161.3/km^{2}). The racial makeup of the town was 96.31% White, 0.41% Black or African American, 0.08% Native American, 2.03% Asian, 0.42% from other races, and 0.74% from two or more races. Hispanic or Latino of any race were 0.95% of the population.

There were 7,027 households, out of which 41.5% had children under the age of 18 living with them, 69.6% were married couples living together, 9.8% had a female householder with no husband present, and 17.8% were non-families. Of all households 14.0% were made up of individuals, and 5.9% had someone living alone who was 65 years of age or older. The average household size was 3.00 and the average family size was 3.33.

In the town, the population was spread out, with 27.6% under the age of 18, 5.9% from 18 to 24, 33.5% from 25 to 44, 22.2% from 45 to 64, and 10.8% who were 65 years of age or older. The median age was 36 years. For every 100 females, there were 98.1 males. For every 100 females age 18 and over, there were 94.1 males.

The median income for a household in the town was $70,652, and the median income for a family was $76,760. Males had a median income of $50,446 versus $36,729 for females. The per capita income for the town was $25,835. About 1.8% of families and 1.9% of the population were below the poverty line, including 1.7% of those under age 18 and 2.7% of those age 65 or over. It is the 134th richest place in Massachusetts. See Massachusetts locations by per capita income.

== Economy ==
Companies based in Wilmington include Analog Devices, Charles River Laboratories, Onto Innovation and UniFirst.

== Arts and culture ==
Points of interest include:

- The Wilmington Town Common and Rotary Park are in the center of town. There are several parks and public recreation facilities throughout town with walking paths, soccer fields, baseball diamonds, and other athletic facilities.
- Shriners Auditorium: a 2,650-seat indoor arena, home of Boston Roller Derby women's flat track roller derby league.
- Silver Lake: The shore of Silver Lake contains the Town Beach, a playground, Fullerton Park, and Landry Park.
- Ristuccia Ice Arena: the former practice rink of the Boston Bruins, it also offers lessons.
- The Baldwin Apple Monument on Chestnut St., southwest of town, marks site of original Baldwin apple tree.
- The Wilmington Memorial library.
- Yentile Farm Recreational Facility: A large public recreational facility located near the center of town.

== Government ==
Wilmington has an open town meeting, a board of selectmen and a town manager. The current town manager is Eric Slagle. Five of the town's six districts are represented in the Massachusetts House of Representatives by David Robertson, the last is represented by Ken Gordon. The town's state senator is Barry Finegold. Wilmington is in the Massachusetts 6th Congressional District and is represented in the United States House of Representatives by Seth Moulton.

== Education ==
Wilmington has its own schools. Kindergarten students attend the Wildwood Street and Boutwell Street Schools. Grades 1–3 attend the Woburn Street School and the Shawsheen School. Grades 4 and 5 attend the North Intermediate School and the West Intermediate School. Grades 6–8 attend Wilmington Middle School. High School Students attend Wilmington High School. Wilmington High's mascot is the wildcat and its athletic teams participate in the Middlesex League, which the town recently changed to. The Wildcats' colors are Navy Blue, Columbia Blue and White and the primary rivals are the Tewksbury Redmen of the Merrimack Valley Conference. Wilmington is also home to Abundant Life Christian School a Pre-K to 8 private religious school. Wilmington students also have the option of attending Shawsheen Valley Technical High School.

== Infrastructure ==
=== Transportation ===
The MBTA Commuter Rail serves Wilmington with two train stations on two of the system's branches – one station per branch. The Lowell Commuter Rail Line stops at Wilmington Station in the center of town, while the Haverhill Commuter Rail Line serves North Wilmington Station located two miles further east. Both stations are located adjacent to Massachusetts State Route 62.

The MBTA Bus serves the town.

== Notable people ==
- Jason Bere, former MLB pitcher, who played for five MLB teams, and American League All-Star in 1994
- Ryland Blackinton, guitarist of Cobra Starship, attended his freshman year at Wilmington High School
- Dudley Allen Buck, inventor of the cryotron, content-addressable memory, and ferroelectric memory
- Sean Collier, Police officer at MIT, killed by perpetrators of the 2013 Boston Marathon bombing
- Harriet Thayer Durgin (born 1848), painter and educator
- Lyle Durgin (born 1850), painter
- Mike Esposito, running back and kick returner for the Atlanta Falcons in the late 1970s. He also set a number of rushing records for Boston College Eagles
- Keith Gill, retail investor notable for his involvement in the GameStop short squeeze
- Gen. Henry Harnden, Civil War officer, tracked down Confederate President Jefferson Davis and confirmed his identity
- David G. Hartwell (1941-2016), science-fiction editor
- Thomas Holmes, executive with W. R. Grace and Ingersoll Rand
- Ezra Otis Kendall, LL.D., 1818–1899 prof. of mathematics and astronomy at University of Pennsylvania. Author of Uranography, a guide to the heavens, with atlas, Philadelphia, 1844. Half-brother to Timothy Walker and Sears Cook Walker
- Benjamin Thompson, Jr., Count Rumford, taught school in Wilmington 1768–1769
- Dan Vassallo, marathon runner, 3-time Olympic Trials qualifier
- Sears Cook Walker, 19th-century astronomer, brother of Timothy Walker, half-brother of E.O. Kendall
- Timothy Walker, noted 19th-century jurist, author of Introduction to American Law, founder of Cincinnati Law School
- Phillis Wheatley, first published African-American poet
