= Gaius Glenn Atkins =

American minister

- Born: October 4, 1868; Mount Carmel, Indiana
- Died: April 5, 1956 (aged 87); Bethlehem, Pennsylvania
- Education: Ohio State University
- Occupation: Minister
- Spouse: Ada Haynes

Gaius Glenn Atkins (October 4, 1868 – April 5, 1956) was a Congregational minister, author, and a professor of homiletics at Auburn Theological Seminary in New York City.

== Early life and education ==
He was born in Mount Carmel, Indiana to Thomas Benjamin Atkins and Caroline Morris. His father was a rural minister, and his first name was taken from the New Testament. He graduated from Ohio State University in 1888, and was a member of Beta Theta Pi and Phi Beta Kappa. He earned a bachelor of law degree from Cincinnati Law School in 1891, and graduated from Yale Divinity School in 1892. He received a D.D. degree from Dartmouth and an L.H.D. in 1923 from the University of Vermont. In 1933, he obtained his Litt.D. from Ohio State University.

== Career ==
Before entering the ministry, he was head of the history department at Mount Hermon School from 1892 to 1895. During this time, he was heavily influenced by the school's founder, Dwight L. Moody.

He was ordained as a Congregational minister in 1895. He served the following churches:

- Second Congregational Church, Greenfield, Massachusetts (1895–1900)
- First Congregational Church, Burlington, Vermont (1900–1906)
- First Congregational Church, Detroit, Michigan (1906–1910)
- Central Congregational Church, Providence, Rhode Island (1910 to 1917)
- First Congregational Church, Detroit, Michigan (1917–1927)

He was a professor of homiletics at Auburn Seminary from 1927 to his retirement in 1939. He also lectured at Union Theological Seminary.

In 1911, his comments on the marriage of John Jacob Astor IV and Madeleine Force were featured in the New York Times. Their wedding was performed by another Providence Congregational minister in Newport. The Times wrote "As a preliminary to his sermon the Rev. Gaius Glenn Atkins, pastor of the Central Congregational Church, the largest and wealthiest congregational parish in Providence referred to the marriage. 'I hesitate to speak on the matter, but I regret exceedingly that the Congregational Church generally and the Congregational churches in Providence in particular were called upon to bear the odium of the solemnization of the marriage of Col. John Jacob Astor and Miss Force....As far as I personally know the temper, either of the Congregational ministers or the Congregational Church as a whole, I want to say emphatically that I do not believe that the thing which has been done represents either our attitude or ideals.'

During the First World War, he worked as a YMCA worker with soldiers in France and served as the American director of the Foyer du Soldat with the French Army.

He was the author of 19 books himself and two books with colleagues. One such work was Modern Religious Cults and Movements. One sermon preached at Central Church in 1914 was entitled The Right and Wrong of Feminism. Atkins was critical of movements such as Baháʼí Faith, Christian Science, Unity Church, New Thought, and Theosophy. In 1942, he published History of American Congregationalism with Frederick W. Fagley.

In 1914, he was the winner of the Carnegie Church Peace Union prize for the best essay on international peace.

He preached at Wellesley College in 1916, and gave the Ohio State commencement address in 1933.

After retiring from teaching, Atkins lived with his wife in Marshfield, Massachusetts. the As of 1953, he was residing in Bethlehem, Pennsylvania.

== Family life ==
He married Adalina Haynes (1867-1947) in Bellbrook, Ohio in 1892. Children included Helen, Morris, Laurence, and Robert Atkins. They owned a cottage called "The Sea Shell" on Heron Island in Maine from 1897 to 1900.

He is buried with his wife in the Bellbrook Cemetery.

== Publications ==
- Pilgrims of the Lonely Road (1913)
- The Maze of the Nations and the Way Out (1915)
- The Godward Side of Life (1917)
- Jerusalem Past and Present: The City of Undying Memories (1918)
- Modern Religious Cults and Movements (1923)
- Religion In Our Times (1932)
- Master Sermons Of The Nineteenth Century (1940)
- History of American Congregationalism (1942)
