= Silver Lake (Wilmington, Massachusetts) =

Kettle lake in Wilmington, Massachusetts

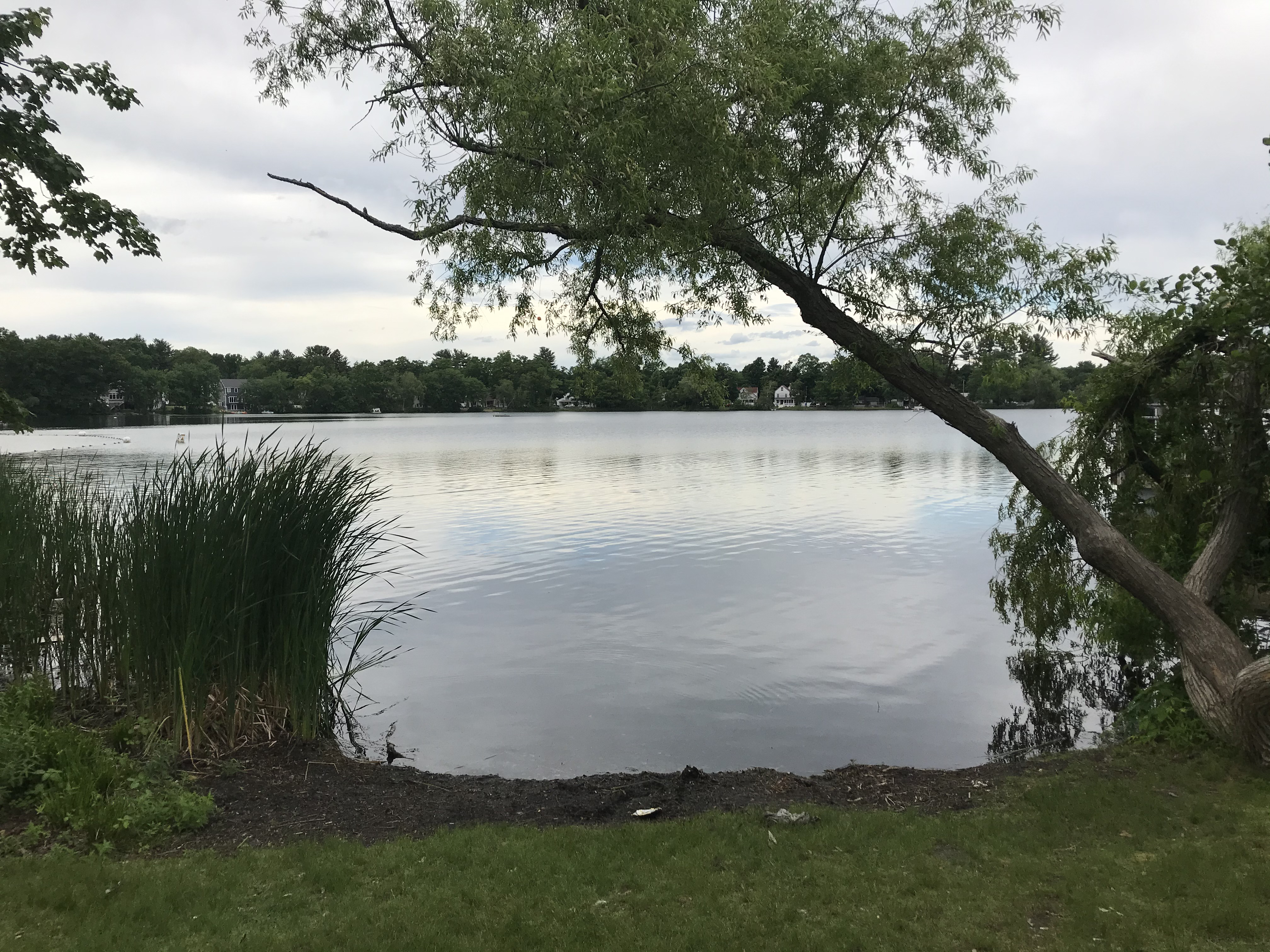
- Silver Lake

- Location within Massachusetts
- Location: Wilmington, Middlesex County, Massachusetts
- Coordinates: 42°33′57″N 71°11′17″W
- Type: Kettle lake
- Basin countries: United States of America

Silver Lake is a kettle lake in Wilmington, Massachusetts. Originally called Sandy Pond, the lake is home to the town beach and draws in visitors from all over Greater Boston during the summer. The lake is at the heart of a USGS recognized populated place in Wilmington and Tewksbury, also called Silver Lake.

== Recreation ==
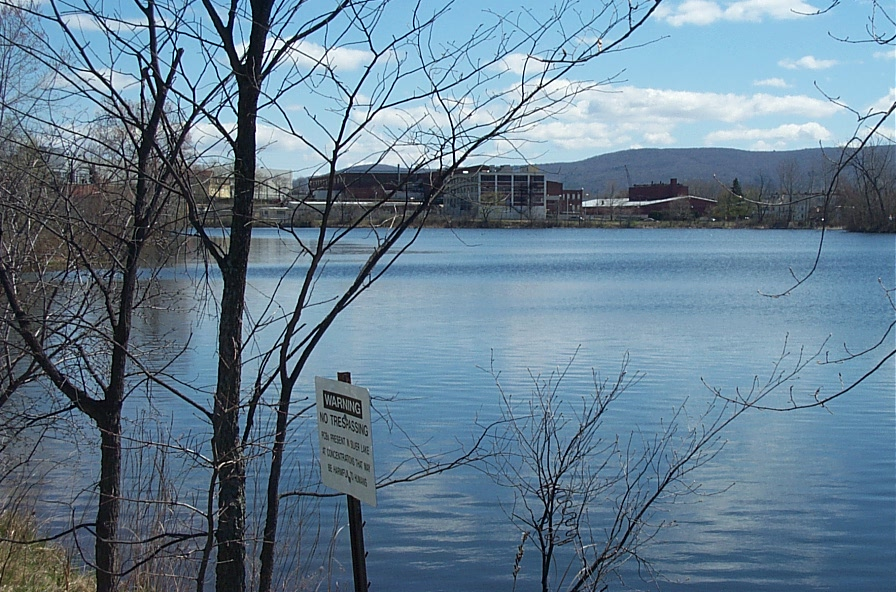

Along the shore of the lake is the Town Beach at Silver Lake, containing a large beach on Burnap Street alongside a playground dedicated to Sean Collier. Next to the beach is Fullerton Park, a large park located on Grove Avenue. Another park, Landry Park, is located along Massachusetts Route 38.

A smaller beach, known as Baby Beach, exists on Grove Avenue as well, however this beach has since been closed to the public.
