= Wilmington High School (Massachusetts) =

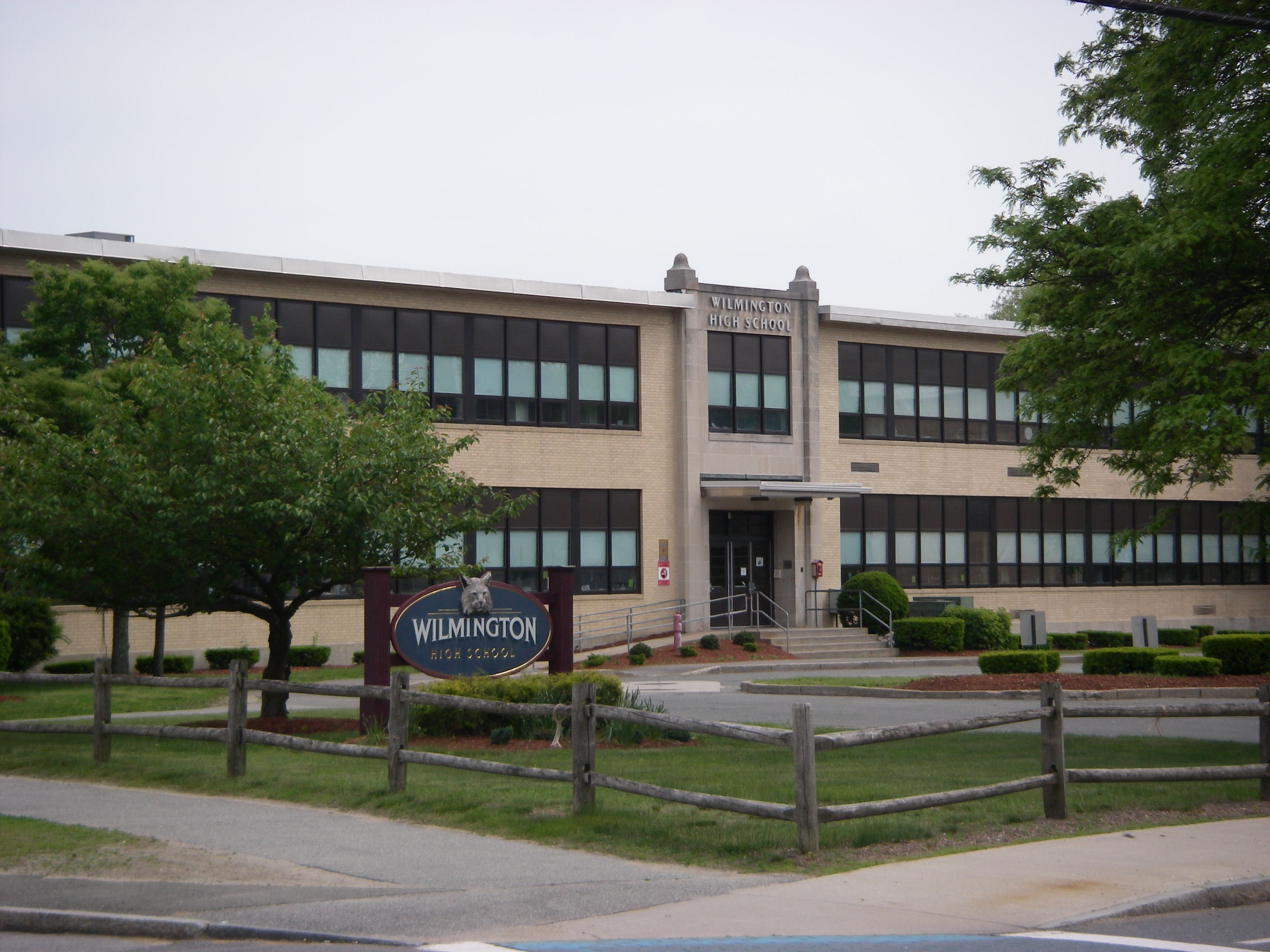
- Old building - demolished 2015

Location
- 159 Church Street; Wilmington, Massachusetts 01887; United States; 42°33′21″N 71°09′52″W

Information
- Type: Public
- Principal: Ryan Gendron
- Faculty: 70
- Grades: High school (9-12)
- Enrollment: 613 (2023-2024)
- Student to teacher ratio: 9.18
- Colors: Navy Blue, Columbia Blue and White
- Mascot: Wildcat
- Team name: Wildcats
- Rival: Tewksbury Memorial High School (Tewksbury, MA)
- Website: whs.wpsk12.com

Wilmington High School is the public high school for the town of Wilmington, Massachusetts, United States. It is home to the Wilmington Wildcats. Ryan Gendron is the principal.

== New High School Project ==
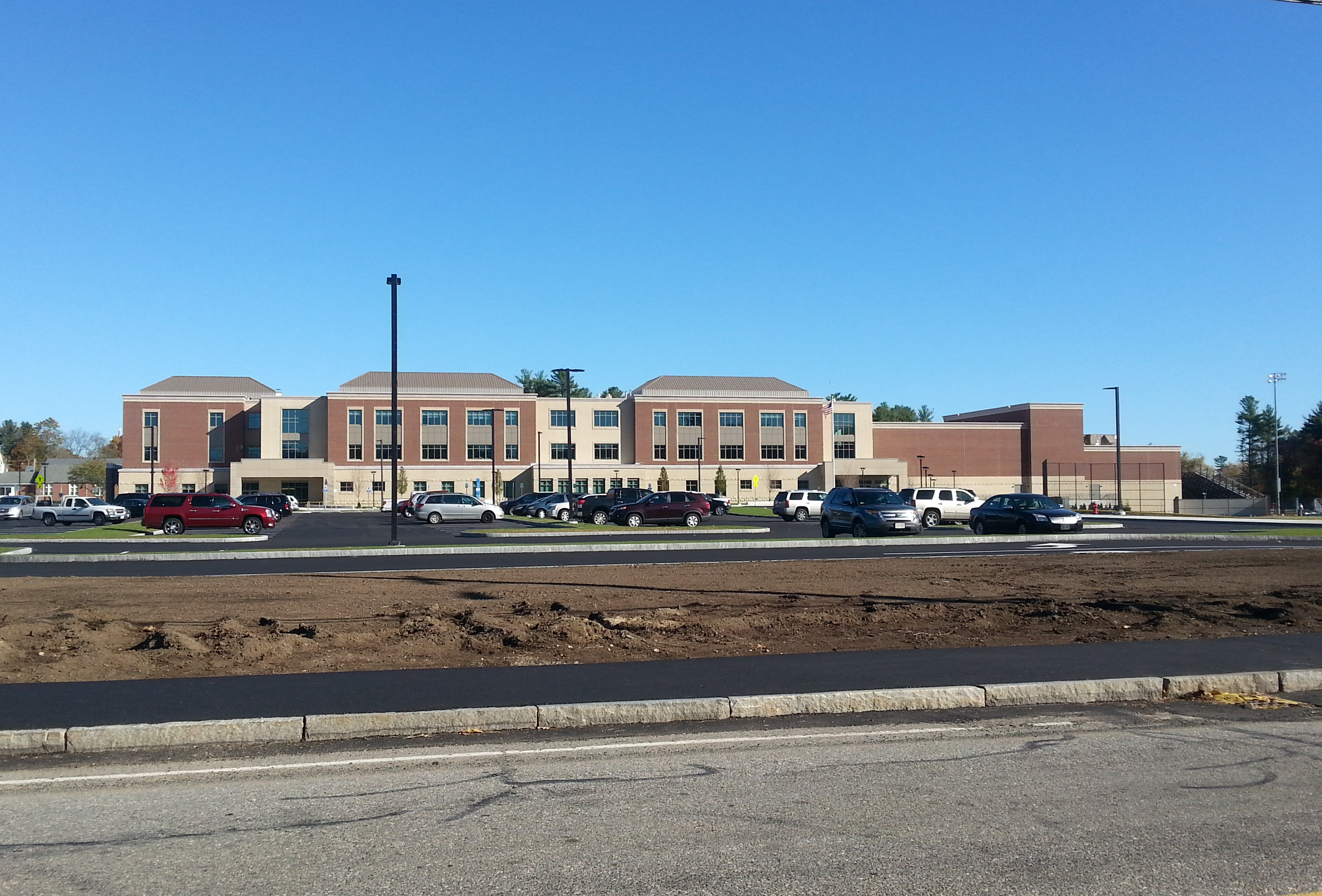
New building - southwest view

Wilmington was approved by the state of Massachusetts to build a new high school. On January 9, 2013, it was announced that the school's gymnasium would be torn down. Many saw this to be a big step forward in the construction of a much-needed, 21st-century education for the students of Wilmington. Nearly two years after the demolition of the gymnasium, the new high school was completed. An event celebrating the school's completion was held on Sunday, February 22, 2015, and students moved into the new school on February 24, 2015. Demolition of the old high school began in March 2015, and the rest of the athletic facilities were demolished by the end of 2015.

== Rotating Schedule ==
The school has a four-day schedule with four classes a day including a lunch block. Each class is 75 minutes long, with three different half-hour lunch periods throughout the day. Additionally, there is a flex block period which functions as a study hall. Blue 1: 1-2-3-4 White 1: 1-2-3-4 Blue 4: 4-2-3-1 White 4: 4-2-3-1

== Sports ==
In 2012 and 2013, the Wilmington High School boys' hockey team won the school's first Division 2 state championships, beating Franklin High School in the championship game two years in a row.

== Notable alumni ==
- Jason Bere, former MLB pitcher
- Ryland Blackinton, guitarist of Cobra Starship
- Mike Esposito, former NFL player
- David G. Hartwell, science fiction editor
- Olivia Wingate, soccer player
