= Old East Boston High School =

- U.S. National Register of Historic Places
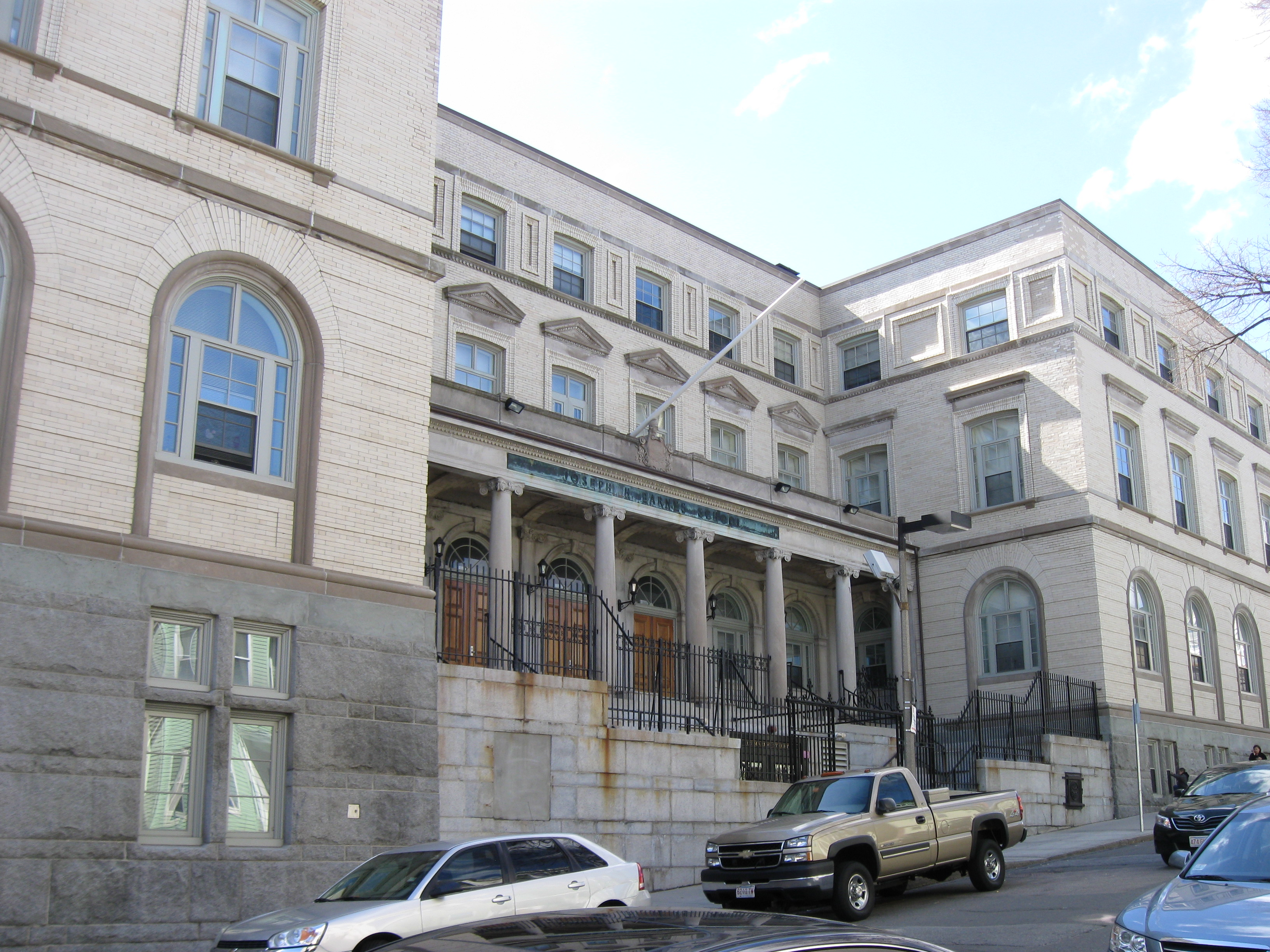
- View of the Old East Boston High School façade.

- Location within Boston Location within Massachusetts Location within the United States
- Location: Boston, Massachusetts
- Coordinates: 42°22′36″N 71°02′12″W
- Built: 1901
- Architect: John Lyman Faxon; Charles R. Greco
- Architectural style: Renaissance
- NRHP reference No.: 06000127
- Added to NRHP: March 15, 2006

Old East Boston High School (also known as Joseph H. Barnes School) is an historic school building at 127 Marion Street in East Boston, Massachusetts. It now acts as Section 8 housing for elderly or disabled people.

This building is currently under consideration for Boston Landmark status by the Boston Landmarks Commission.

The Renaissance style school was built in 1901 to a design by John Lyman Faxon and expanded in 1933 to a design by Charles R. Greco. It is a three-story structure, faced in yellow brick and limestone, with a flat roof and a raised basement. It is roughly in the shape of an H, with a central section that has side wings projecting to both the front and rear. A circular auditorium section stands behind the central section.

The building was added to the National Register of Historic Places in 2006.

== See also ==
- National Register of Historic Places listings in northern Boston, Massachusetts
