= Ezra Otis Kendall =

American professor, astronomer and mathematician

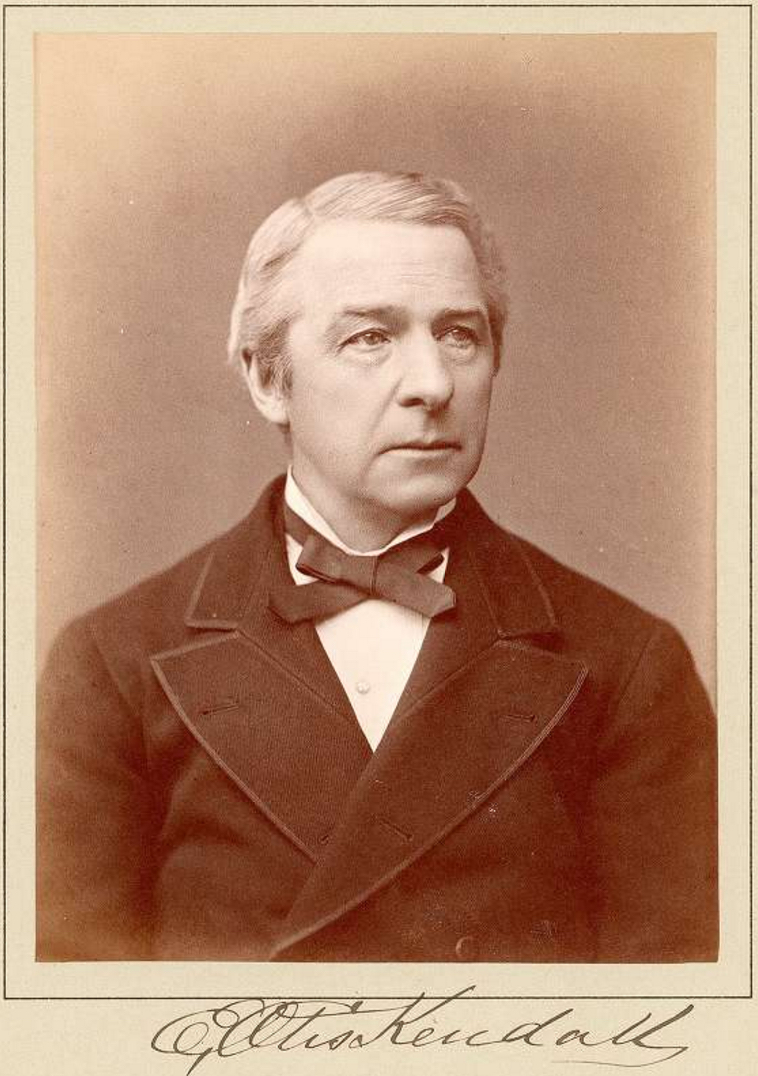
- Born: May 17, 1818; Wilmington, Massachusetts, US
- Died: January 5, 1899 (aged 80); Philadelphia, Pennsylvania, US

Ezra Otis Kendall (1818–1899) was an American professor, astronomer and mathematician. He was known for his work in uranography.

Kendall was born on May 17, 1818, in Wilmington, Massachusetts to parents Ezra Kendall and Susanna Cook Walker. His mother was a descendant of Mayflower passengers Francis Cooke and Stephen Hopkins. In 1835, he moved to Philadelphia to study mathematics with Sears Cook Walker, his half-brother. In 1838, he became professor of mathematics and astronomy at Philadelphia's Central High School and director of the observatory. In 1842, he was elected a member of the American Philosophical Society and later served as a vice-president. In 1855, he became professor of mathematics and astronomy at the University of Pennsylvania. In 1883, he became vice-provost and dean of the college faculty. He received a Doctor of Laws, LL.D., honorary degree from the university in 1888 for his scientific work. He died on January 5, 1899, in Philadelphia and is buried in the Saint Luke's Episcopal Churchyard.

== Works ==
- Kendall, E. Otis; Walker, Sears C. (May 20, 1842). "Observations of Encke's Comet, at the High School Observatory, Philadelphia, March and April 1842, with the Fraunhofer Equatorial". Transactions of the American Philosophical Society.
- Kendall, E. Otis (1845). Uranography; or, A Description of the Heavens; Designed for Academics and Schools; Accompanied by An Atlas of the Heavens, Showing the Places of the Principal Stars, Clusters, and Nebulæ. Philadelphia: E. H. Butler & Co. hdl:2027/hvd.hn2b59.
