= Thomas Holmes (executive) =

American executive

Thomas Holmes is an American executive.

Holmes was born in Wilmington, Massachusetts, where his father, John Thomas Holmes, was chairman of the Board of Selectmen. Holmes' father died when Thomas was 10 years old. Holmes graduated from Wilmington High School in 1941.

Holmes served as a naval pilot in the Pacific Theatre in World War II. He then attended the University of Missouri–Rolla (UMR) with the help of the G.I. Bill. He majored in mining engineering.

He went on to work for Ingersoll Rand for 30 years, eventually becoming CEO in 1980, stepping down in 1988. In the 1990s, he was chairman of W.R. Grace.

He is known among residents of Wilmington for providing a full scholarship that allows other Wilmington High students to study at UMR.
