= John Lyman Faxon =

American architect (1851–1918)

- Born: July 19, 1851; Quincy, Massachusetts
- Died: March 13, 1918 (aged 66); Newton, Massachusetts
- Occupation: Architect

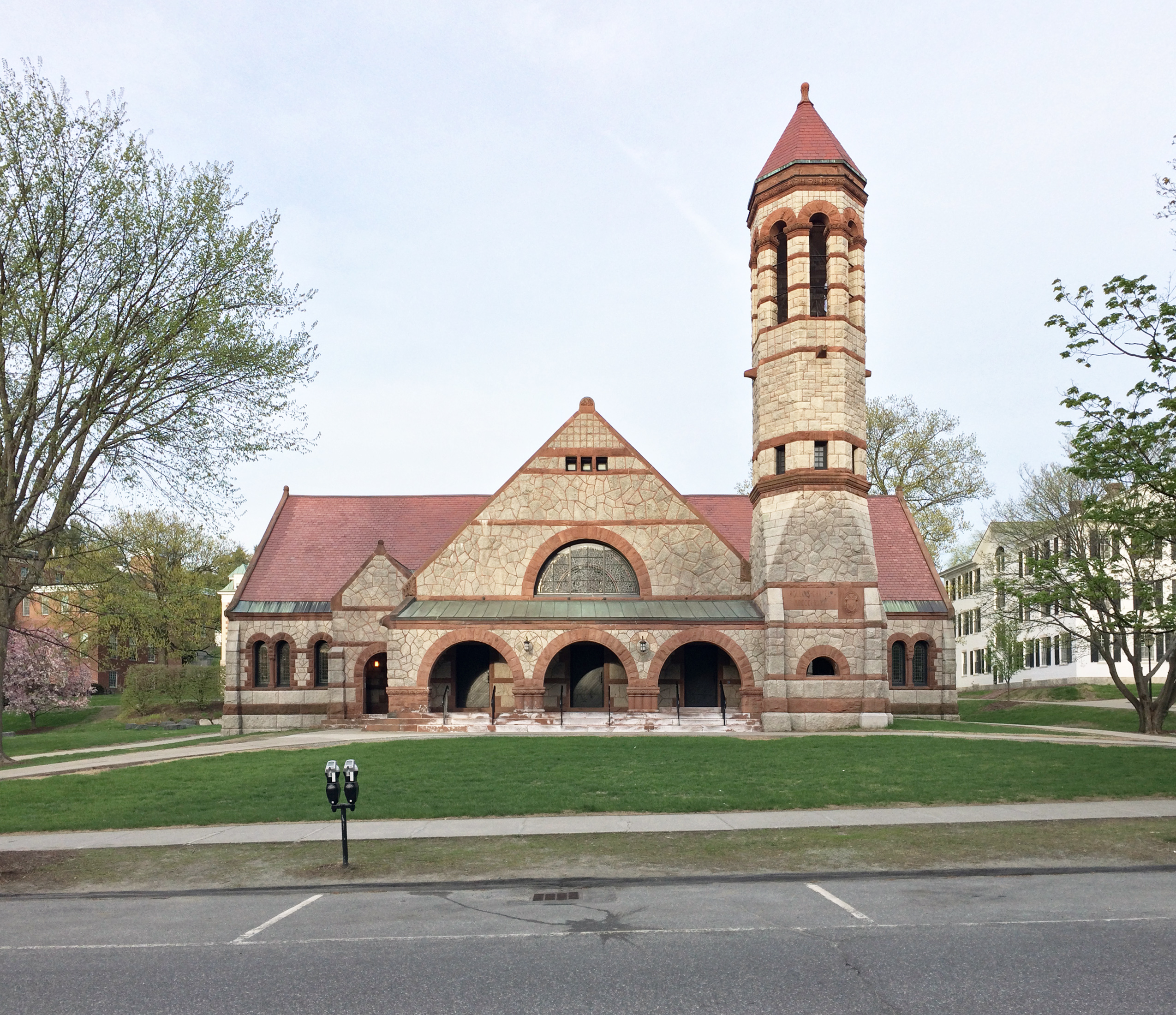
Rollins Chapel, Dartmouth College, Hanover, New Hampshire, 1884-85

John Lyman Faxon (1851–1918) was an American architect practicing in Boston, Massachusetts, during the late nineteenth and early twentieth centuries. Three of his buildings, the First Baptist Church of Newton (1888), the First Congregational Church of Detroit (1889–91) and the former East Boston High School (1898–1901), have been listed on the United States National Register of Historic Places.

== Life and career ==
John Lyman Faxon was born July 19, 1851, in Quincy, Massachusetts, to Francis Gray Faxon and his first cousin, Elizabeth (Faxon) Faxon. He attended the architectural school of the Massachusetts Institute of Technology, graduating in 1874. He then formed a partnership with his uncle, J. Warren Faxon, a grocer turned real estate developer. This partnership, known as J. W. & J. L. Faxon, was formed to design and develop buildings in downtown Boston. This was dissolved in 1876, with Faxon turning to private practice. In 1877 Faxon briefly relocated to Saint John, New Brunswick, prompted by the fire of that year. In practice as Currier & Faxon with Springfield architect James M. Currier, Faxon was one of many architects who participated in the rebuilding of St. John. Faxon returned to Boston in January 1878.

In 1909 Faxon formed a partnership with New York architects Danford N. B. Sturgis, a son of architect Russell Sturgis, and Norman McGlashan. The new firm of Sturgis, Faxon & McGlashan, known as Sturgis & Faxon from 1910, had offices in New York and Boston, but was cut short by the death of Sturgis in 1911.

== Personal life ==
Faxon married in 1882, to Mary Jane Carr of Quincy. They separated circa 1888, and she died in 1894. They had one daughter.

Faxon died March 13, 1918, in Newton.

== Legacy ==
Faxon was the author of Byzantine Art and the New Old First (1891), written to explain his architectural philosophy as well as his design of the First Congregational Church of Detroit. He also wrote extensively on art and design in the architectural press. After his retirement, Faxon prepared a manuscript entitled The Ancient Theatres of Europe, which was completed but unpublished at the time of his death. It was gifted to the Boston Public Library in 1925.

At least three buildings designed by Faxon have been listed on the United States National Register of Historic Places, and others contribute to listed historic districts.

== Architectural works ==
- Holbrook Town Hall, Holbrook, Massachusetts (1878)
- Emerson School (former), Concord, Massachusetts (1880)
- Mansfield Town Hall, Mansfield, Massachusetts (1882–83, demolished)
- Leonard School (former), Malden, Massachusetts (1884)
- Rollins Chapel, Dartmouth College, Hanover, New Hampshire (1884–85)
- Hotel Victoria, Boston, Massachusetts (1886)
- First Baptist Church, Newton, Massachusetts (1888, NRHP 1982)
- First Congregational Church, Detroit, Michigan (1889–91, NRHP 1979)
- Dod Hall, Princeton University, Princeton, New Jersey (1890)
- Brown Hall, Princeton University, Princeton, New Jersey (1892)
- Ferdinand Building, (Note: The façade was incorporated into the design of the Bruce C. Bolling Municipal Building, completed in 2015.) Roxbury, Boston, Massachusetts (1895, mostly demolished 2012)
- Twelfth Baptist Church, Boston, Massachusetts (1895–96, demolished)
- Mayhew School, Boston, Massachusetts (1896–97, demolished)
- Mount Olive Baptist Church, Cambridge, Massachusetts (1896–98, demolished 1920)
- East Boston High School (former), East Boston, Boston, Massachusetts (1898-1901, NRHP 2006)
- Knights of Columbus Building, (Note: Designed in association with James Hayden Wright of Boston.) New Haven, Connecticut (1904, demolished)
- James Otis School, East Boston, Boston, Massachusetts (1904)

== Gallery of architectural works ==
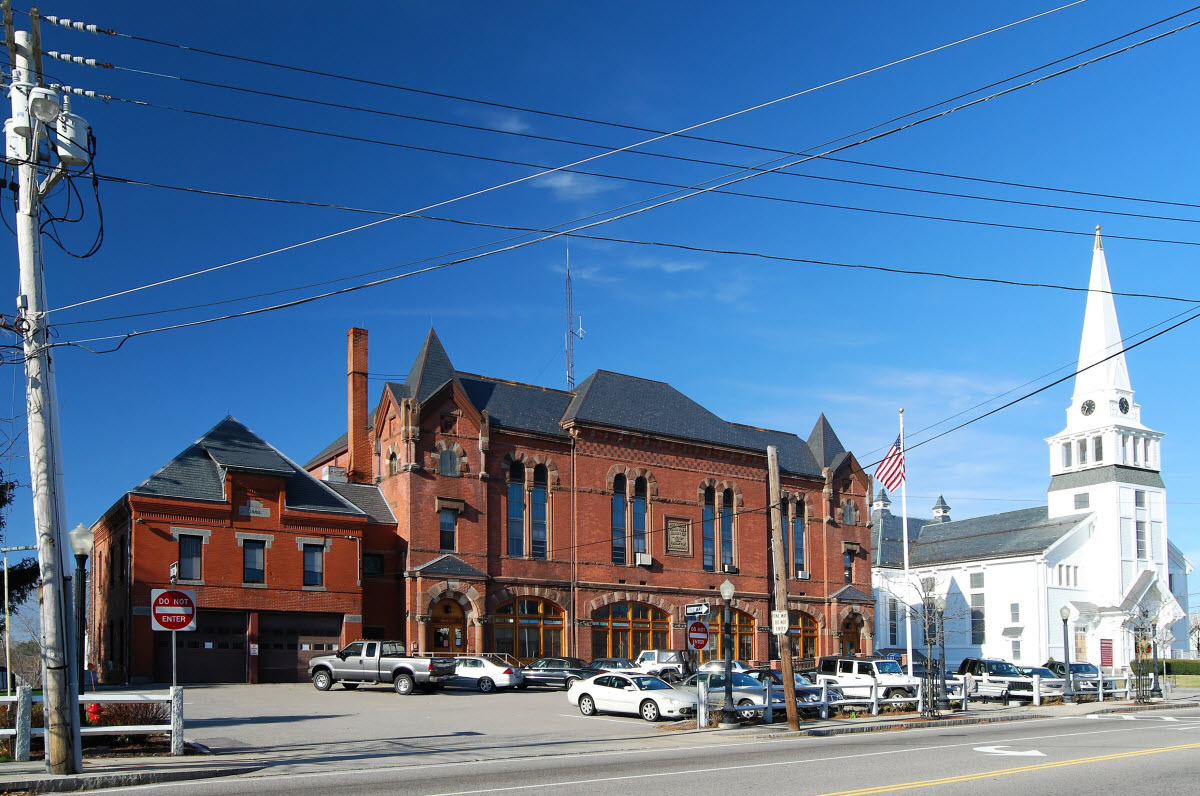
Holbrook Town Hall, Holbrook, Massachusetts, 1878

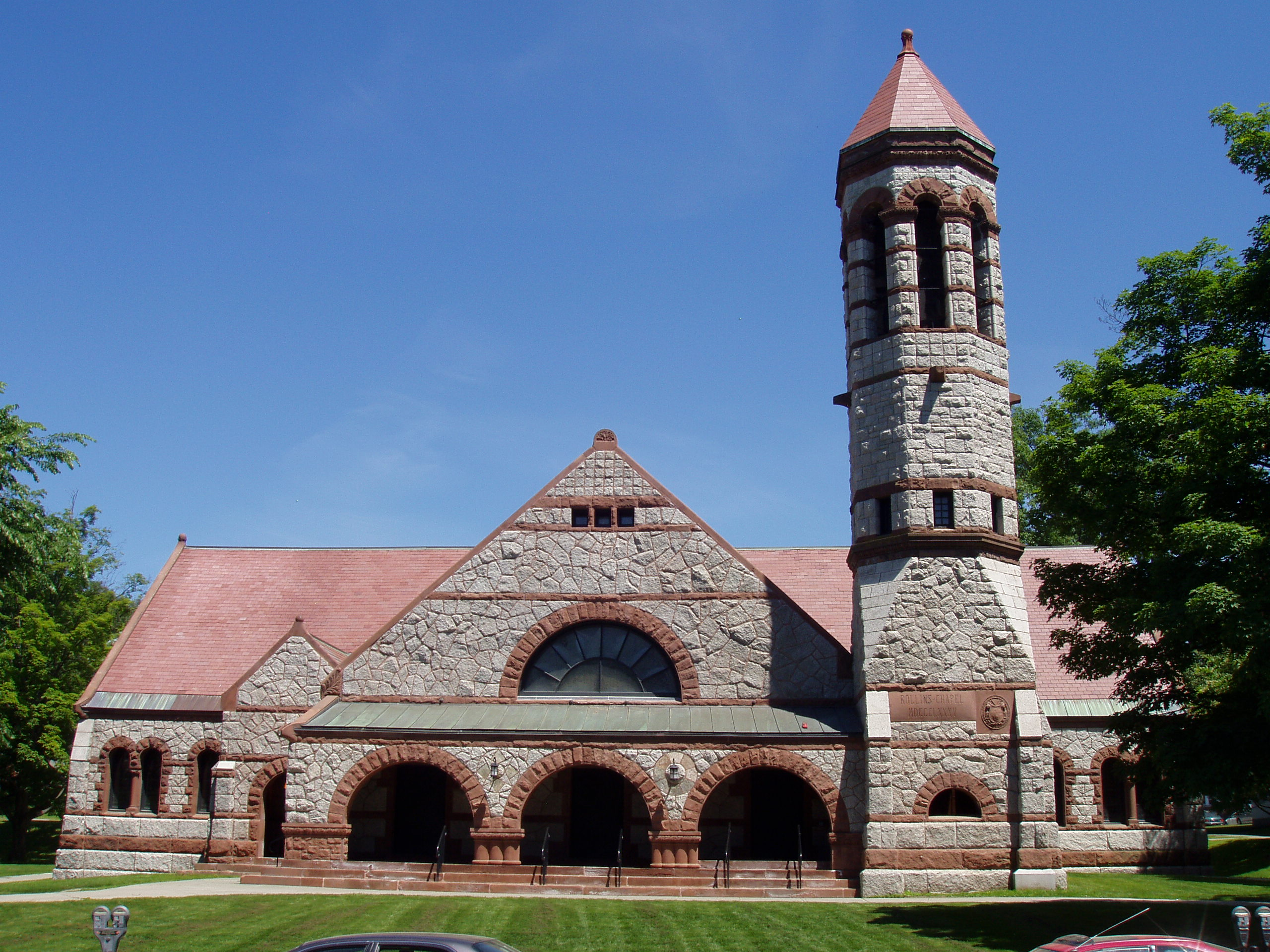
Rollins Chapel, Dartmouth College, Hanover, New Hampshire, 1884–85

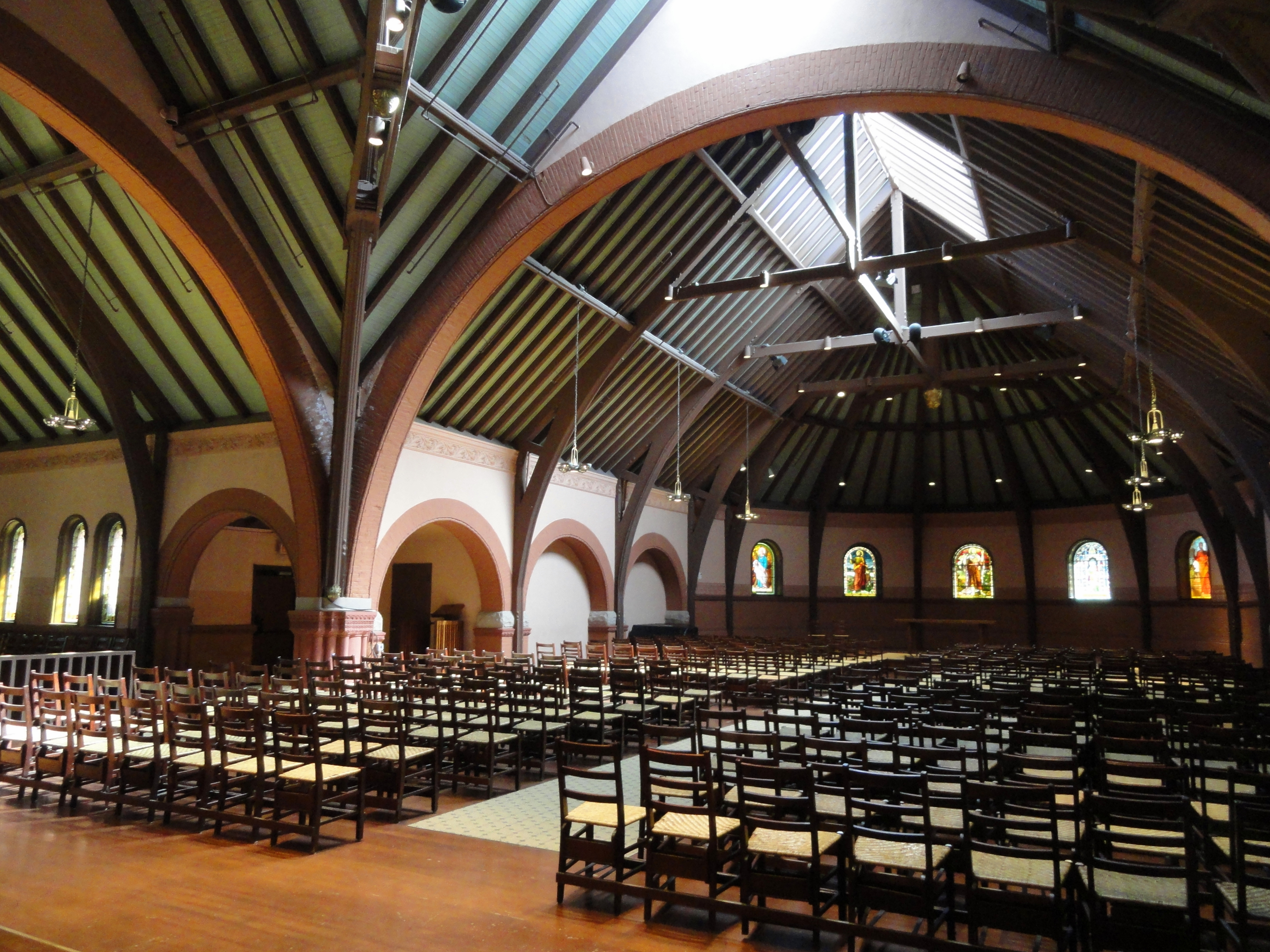
Interior of the Rollins Chapel, Dartmouth College, Hanover, New Hampshire, 1884–85

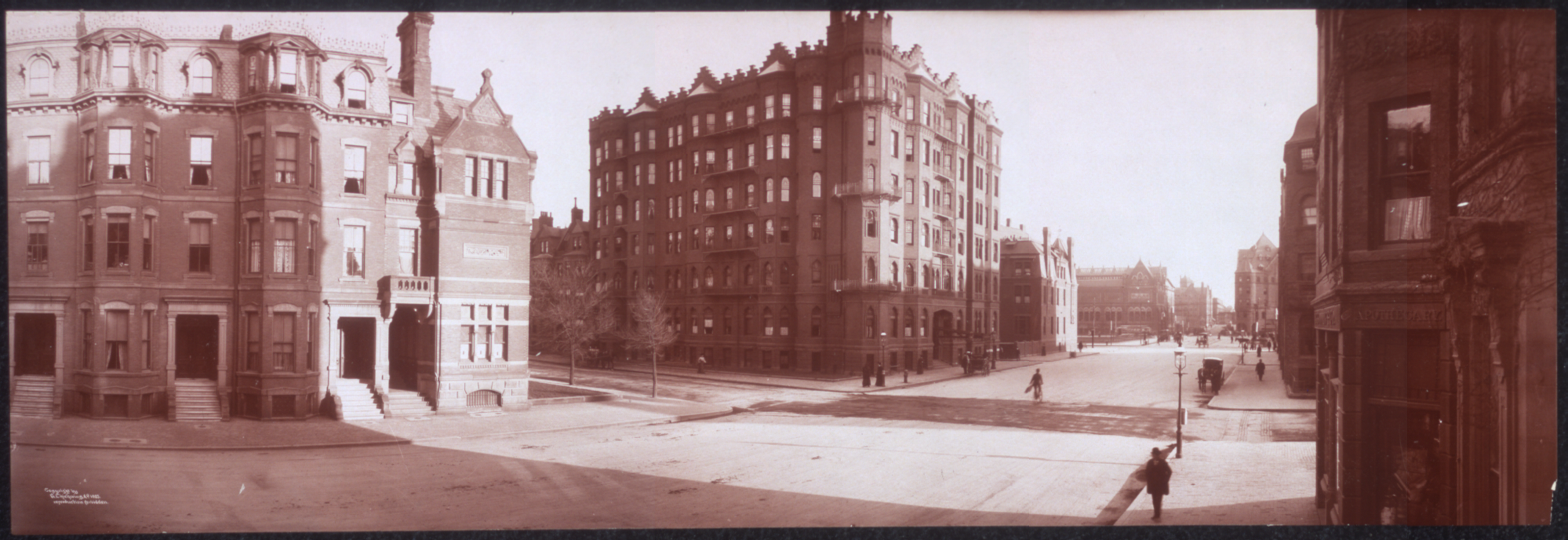
Hotel Victoria (at center), Boston, Massachusetts, 1886

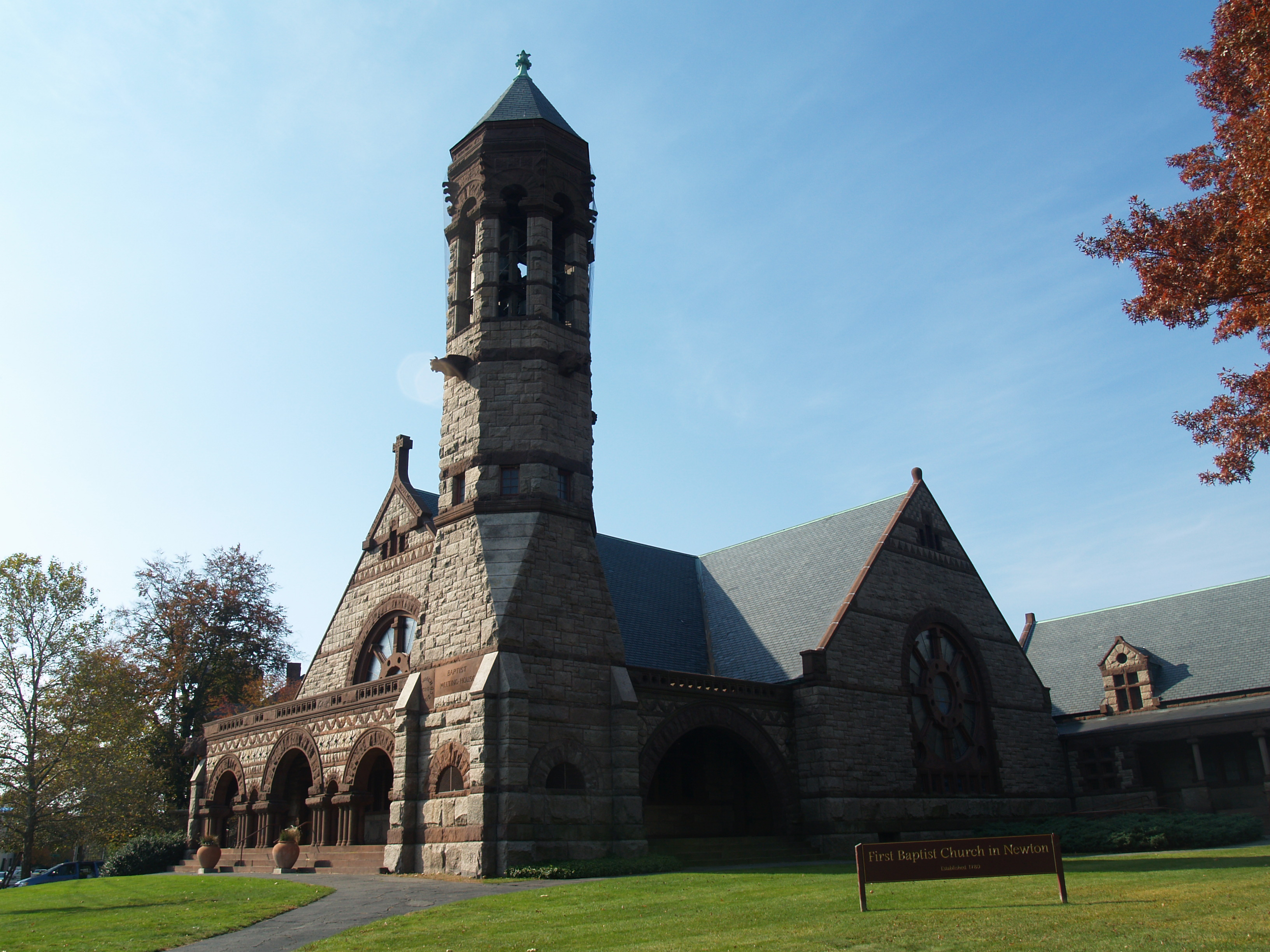
First Baptist Church, Newton, Massachusetts, 1888

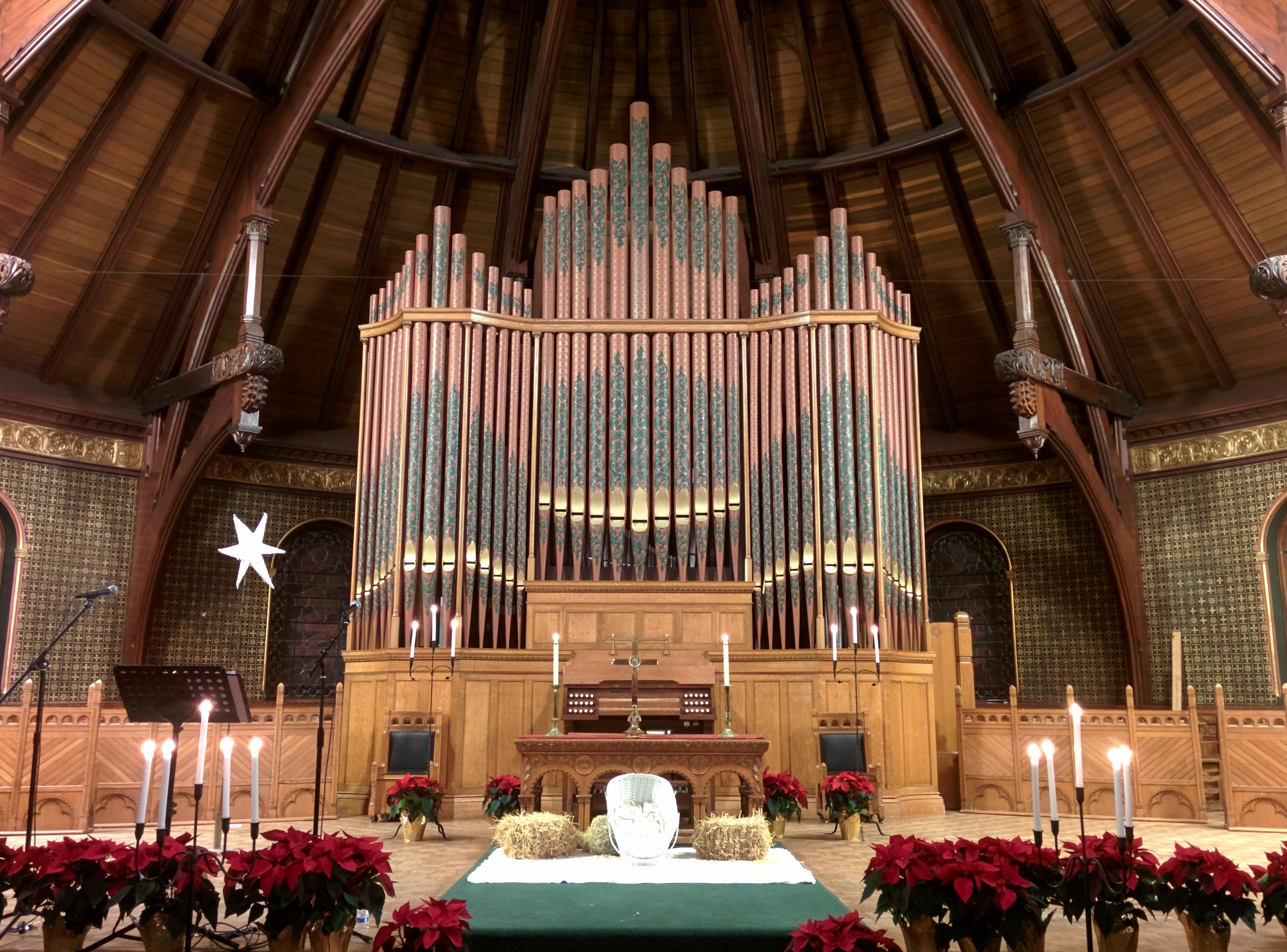
Interior of the First Baptist Church, Newton, Massachusetts, 1888

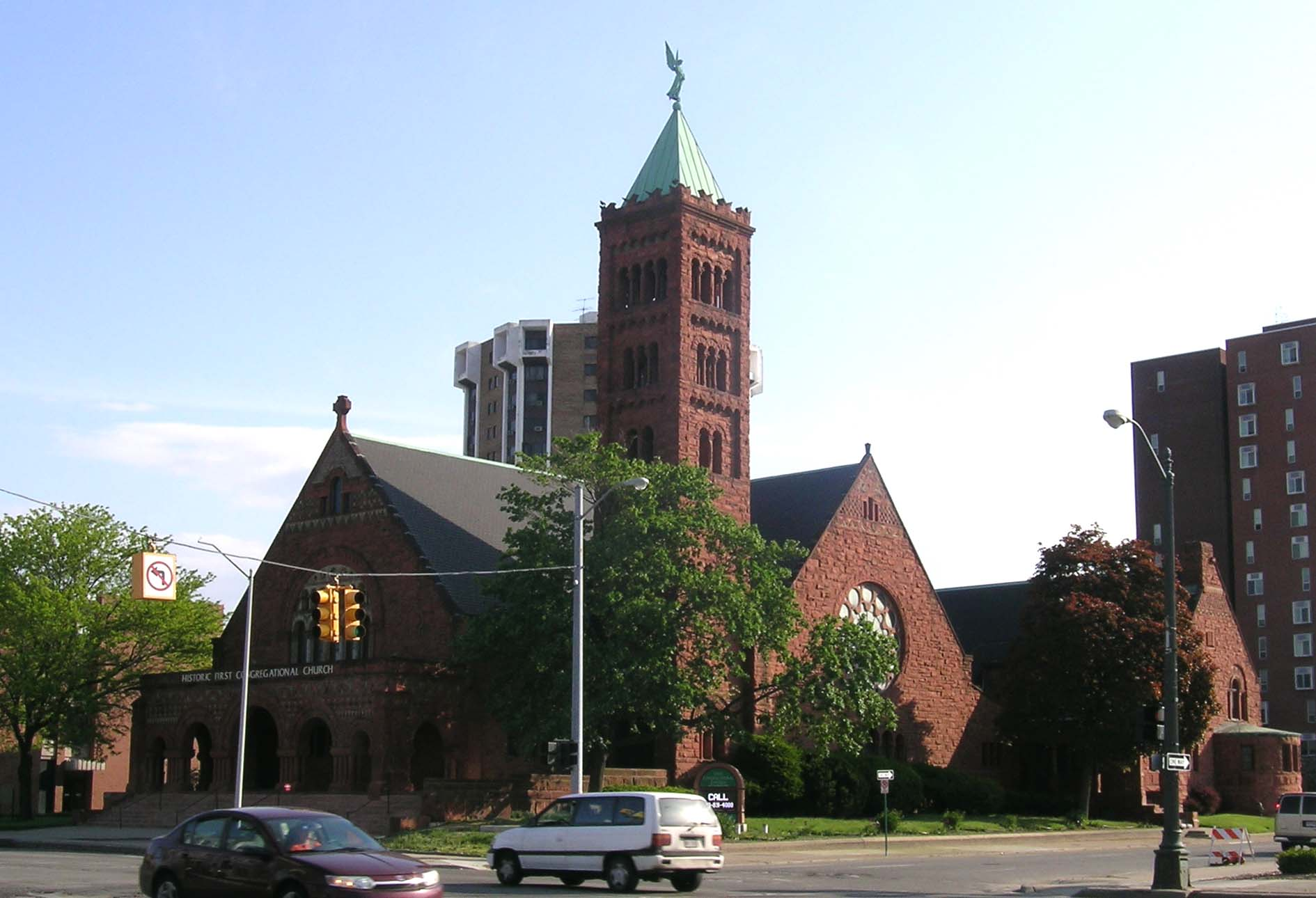
First Congregational Church, Detroit, Michigan, 1889–91

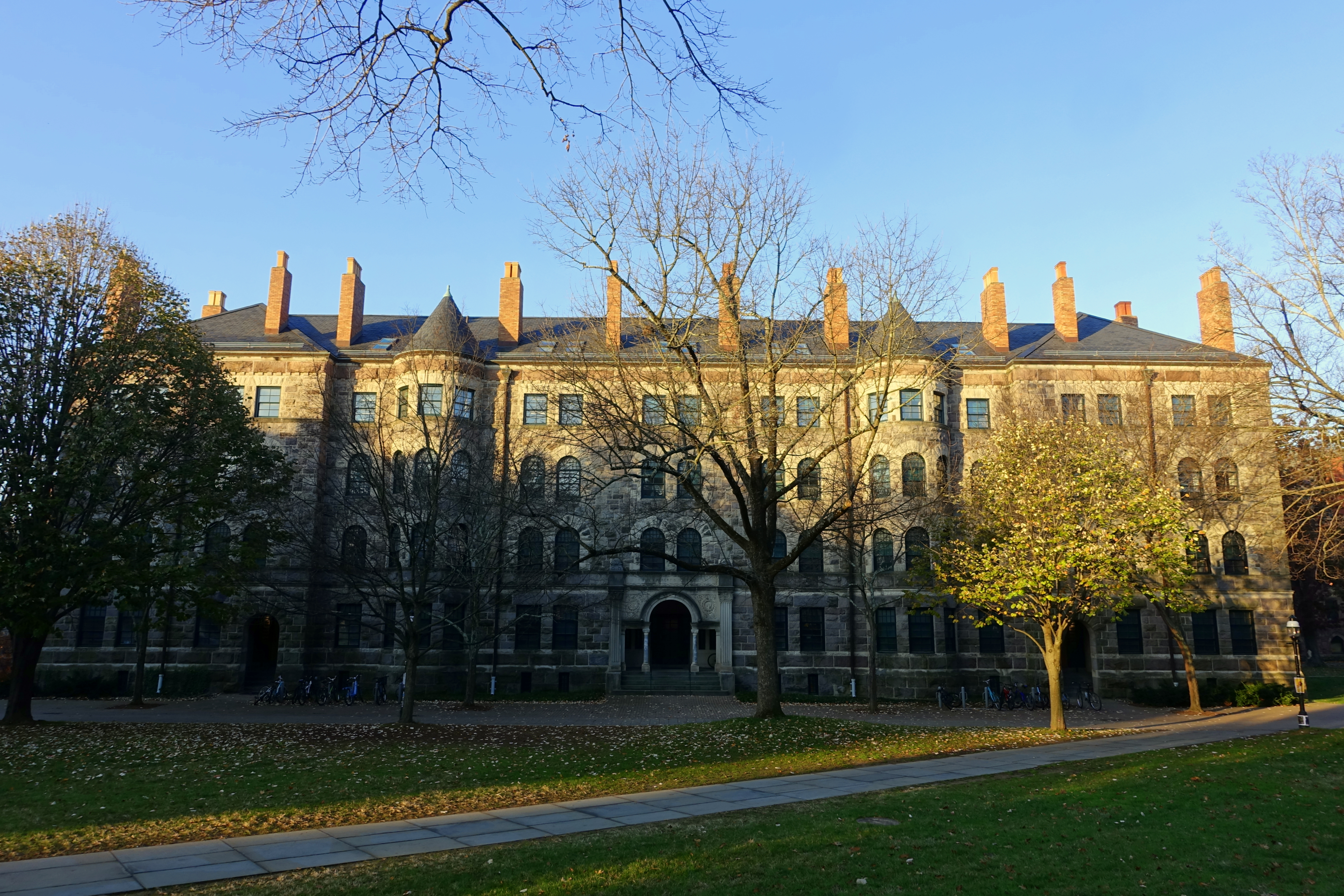
Dod Hall, Princeton University, Princeton, New Jersey, 1890

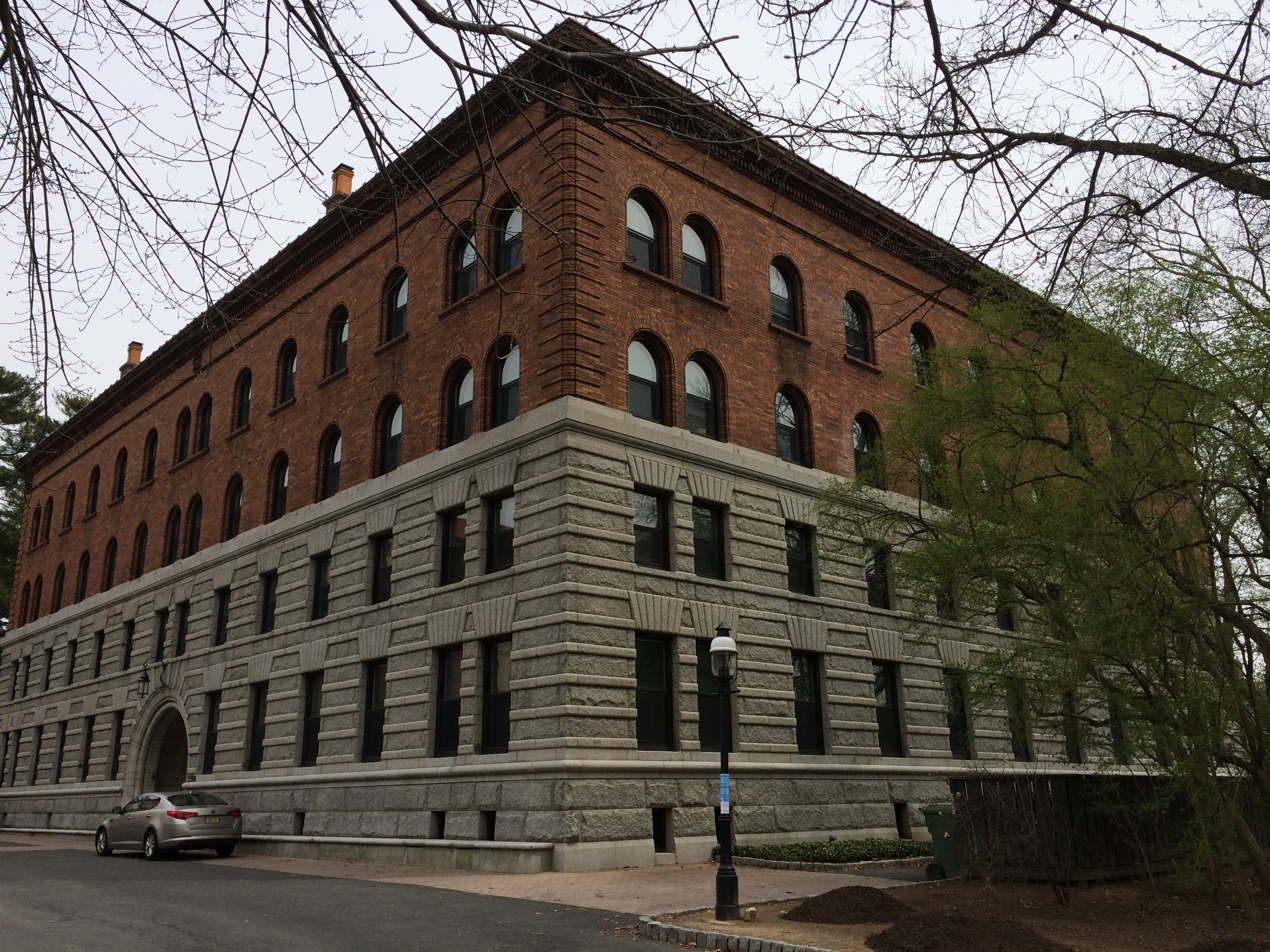
Brown Hall, Princeton University, Princeton, New Jersey, 1892

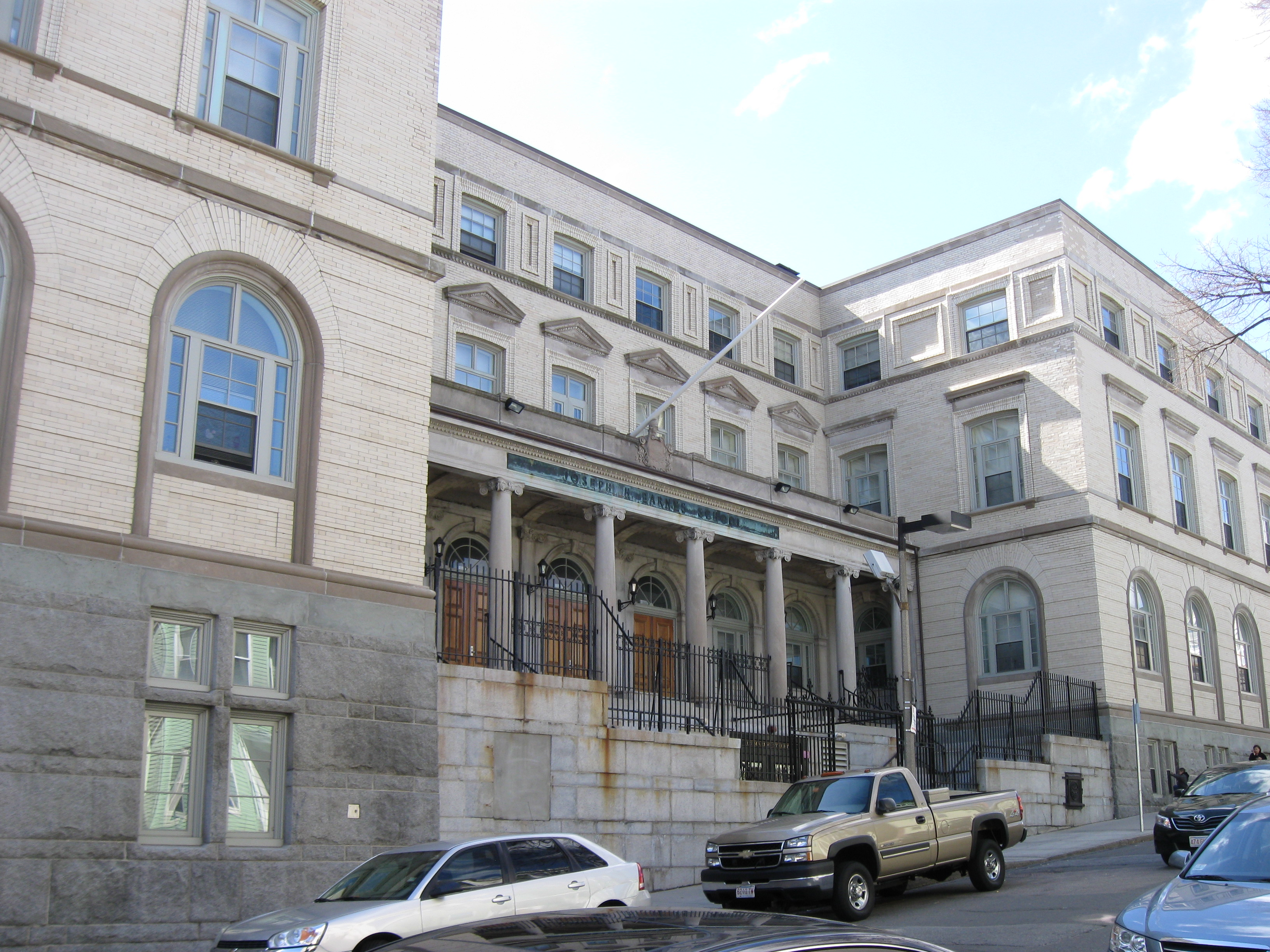
East Boston High School (former), East Boston, Boston, Massachusetts, 1898–1901

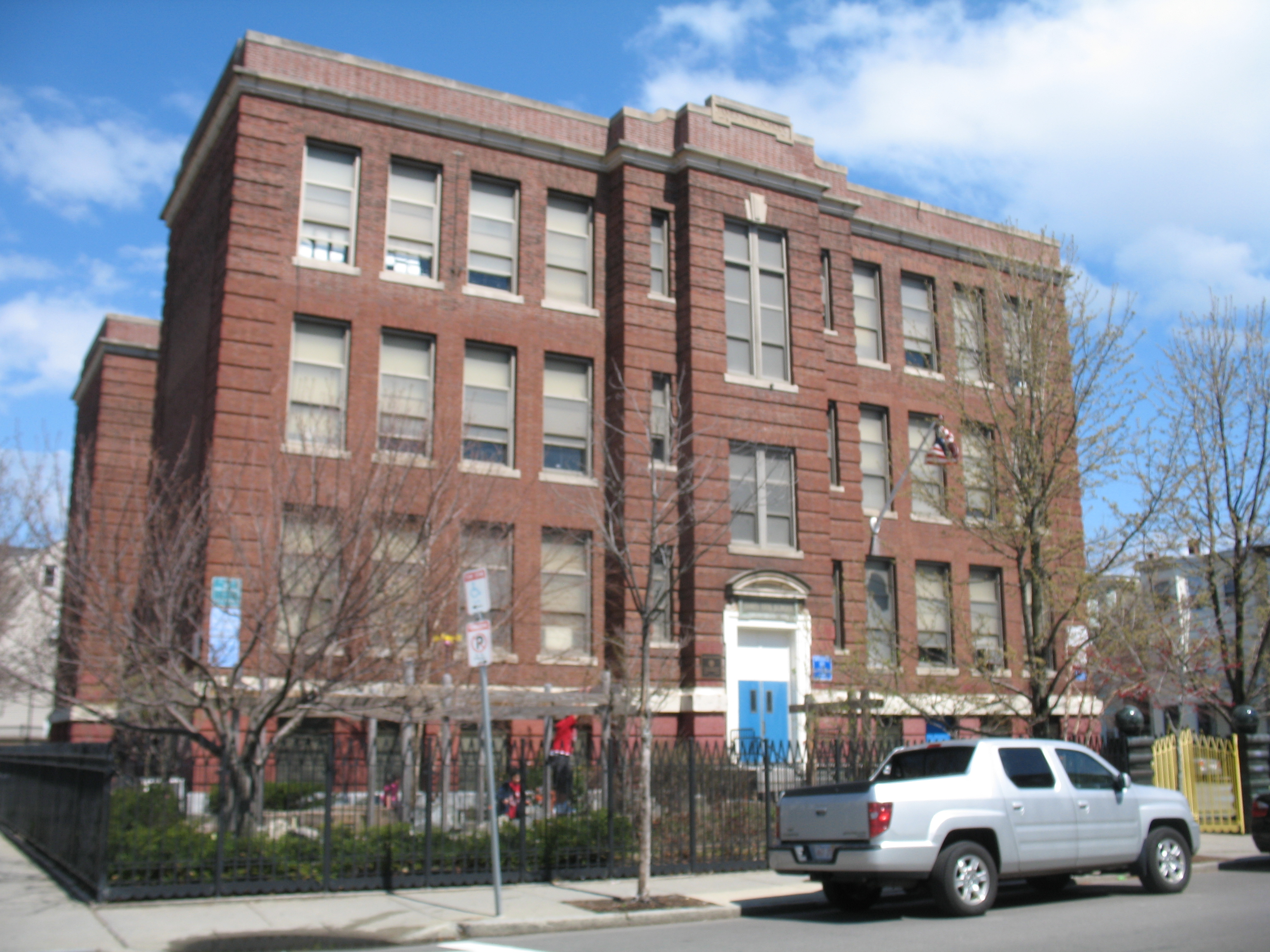
James Otis School, East Boston, Boston, Massachusetts, 1904
