= Harriet Thayer Durgin =

American painter

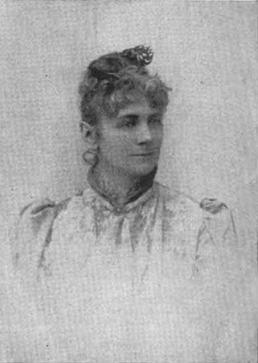
- Born: August 17, 1843; Wilmington, Massachusetts, U.S.
- Died: February 12, 1912 (aged 68)
- Resting place: Gilmanton Ironworks, New Hampshire, U.S.
- Education: Delphine Arnould de Cool-Fortin, Francois Rivoir
- Known for: floral-painting genre

Harriet Thayer Durgin (August 17, 1843 – February 12, 1912) was a pioneering 19th-century American artist from the U.S. state of Massachusetts, who specialized in water colors and sketches of landscapes and still-lifes focused on botanical motifs. After studying in Paris, where she received special notice in the Salon of 1886, she shared a studio in Copley Square, Boston, with her sister, the muralist, Lyle Durgin. Durgin is remembered as one of the foremost American artists of the floral-painting genre during the late 19th and early 20th centuries.

== Early years and education ==
Harriet Thayer Durgin was born in Wilmington, Massachusetts. She was the daughter of Rev. John Milton Durgin (1813–1887), a Baptist minister from New England. Her mother, Harriet R. Thayer (1807–1868), also of New England, was of the Braintree-Thayer family.

The first American ancestor appears to have been William Durgin, who is said to have come from England in 1690 and settled in Massachusetts. He had five children: Francis, William, Daniel, Sarah and Hannah. The identity of the christian names, Francis and William, with those of the following line leaves room for little doubt that this line is of the same stock. As in the case of most patronymics, there have been considerable variations in the spelling, Durgen, Durgan, Ditrgain and Dirgin, being found in some of the older records. In Colonial times, Benjamin Durgan, of Rowley, Massachusetts, appears on the muster roll of Captain Joseph Smith's company, and in 1776 James Durginn was in the company of Captain Moses MacFarland, Colonel Nixon's regiment. In later times, Dr. Samuel Holmes Durgin, born at Parsonsfield, Maine, 1839, was a conspicuous figure in the medical profession, having been a lecturer at the Harvard Medical School since 1884, and president of the American Health Association.

One of five children, Durgin pursued her preparatory studies in the schools of her town, and passed the concluding years of study in the New Hampton Institute, in New Hampshire.

== Career ==
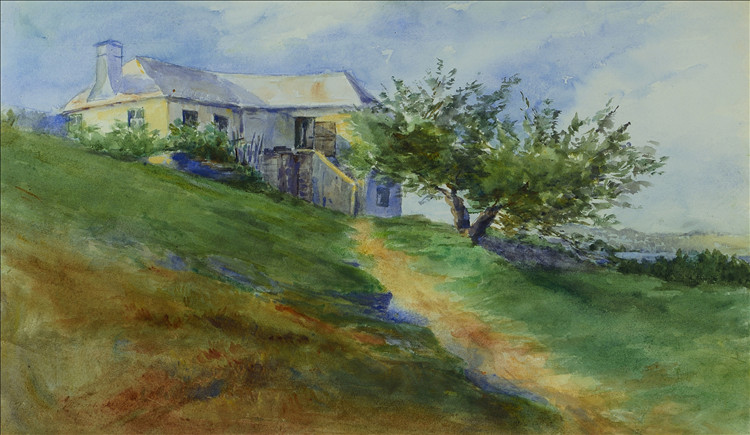
House by the Water, Bermuda

Durgin started her professional life as a teacher. In 1880, she joined her sister, Lyle Durgin, in Paris, France, where they shared a home on the Rue de Verneuil, near the Luxembourg Gallery. In Paris, she entered the studio of Delphine Arnould de Cool-Fortin, and later that of Francois Rivoire. The sisters also found time to sketch in England and Switzerland. After returning to Boston, the sisters opened a studio, on Copley Square. As a flower painter, Durgin was said to stand among the foremost of American artists. A panel of tea roses received special notice in the Salon of 1886, and a group combining flowers and landscape in 1890 won much notice.

Harriet, Lyle and their parents were all interred at the Pine Grove Cemetery at Gilmanton Ironworks, Belknap County, New Hampshire.

== Exhibitions ==
- Solo display, Noyes and Company, Boston (1888)
- Group shows:

- Montreal Art Association (1889)
- National Academy of Design (1898)
- Boston Art Club (1889-1898)
