= Mike Esposito (American football) =

American football player (born 1953)

No. 26
- Position: Running back

Personal information
- Born: April 24, 1953 (age 73); Everett, Massachusetts, U.S.
- Listed height: 6 ft 0 in (1.83 m)
- Listed weight: 183 lb (83 kg)

Career information
- High school: Wilmington (MA)
- College: Boston College
- NFL draft: 1975: 7th round, 159th overall pick

Career history
- Atlanta Falcons (1976–1978)

Awards and highlights
- 2× Second-team All-East (1972, 1973); Boston College Varsity Club Athletic Hall of Fame (1980)

Career NFL statistics
- Rushes: 101
- Rushing yards: 439
- Rushing TDs: 2
- Stats at Pro Football Reference

Michael John Esposito (born April 24, 1953) is an American former professional football player. He is perhaps best known as the player depicted in the logo for the East–West Shrine Bowl.

Esposito attended Wilmington High School in Massachusetts and played college football for the Boston College Eagles as a running back. He went on to play in the National Football League (NFL) for parts of three seasons (1976–1978) with the Atlanta Falcons.

Esposito was a participant in the 50th edition of the East–West Shrine Game, contested in December 1974 in Stanford, California. As part of activities leading up to the game, each player would visit the Shriners Hospitals for Children. While visiting, he noticed Nicole Worley-Urteaga, a two-year-old patient with Holt-Oram syndrome. She appeared frightened and was crying. Esposito took her hand to calm her down and they walked down the hallway together. A photographer from a local newspaper noticed the scene and snapped a photo of the two. The image became the inspiration for the official logo of the annual all-star contest, now known as the East–West Shrine Bowl, and is displayed annually on the 50-yard line. Esposito and Urteaga met again prior to the 100th edition of the game, played in January 2025.

Logo of the East–West Shrine Bowl, featuring Esposito wearing his no. 26 jersey
