= Lyle Durgin =

American artist

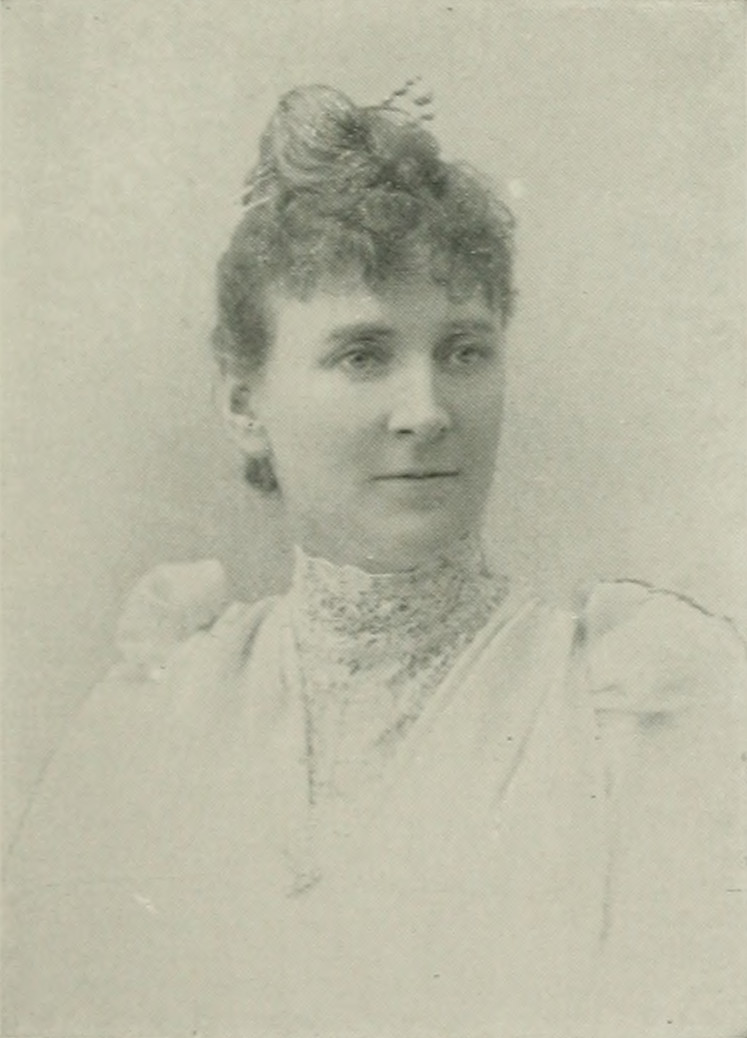
- Born: February 3, 1845; Wilmington, Massachusetts, U.S.
- Died: November 2, 1904 (aged 59)
- Resting place: Gilmanton Ironworks, New Hampshire, U.S.
- Education: Léon Bonnat, Jules Bastien-Lepage, Académie Julian, Georges Chicotot
- Known for: Murals, figure painting

M. Lyle Durgin (February 3, 1845 – November 2, 1904) was a 19th-century American artist from the U.S. state of Massachusetts, who specialized in portraiture and murals. A graduate of New Hampton Institute, New Hampshire, she studied art in Paris where she exhibited in the Salon. After returning to the US, she shared a studio with her sister, Harriet Thayer Durgin, in Copley Square, Boston. Durgin is remembered for designing and executing the murals at the First Congregational Church of Detroit, Michigan.

== Early life and education ==
Lyle Durgin was born in Wilmington, Massachusetts. She was the daughter of John Milton Durgin, a Baptist minister from New England. Her mother, Harriet R. Thayer, also of New England, was of the Braintree-Thayer family.

The first American ancestor appears to have been William Durgin, who is said to have come from England in 1690 and settled in Massachusetts. He had five children: Francis, William, Daniel, Sarah and Hannah. As in the case of most patronymics, there have been considerable variations in the spelling, Durgen, Durgan, Ditrgain and Dirgin, being found in some of the older records. In Colonial times, Benjamin Durgan, of Rowley, Massachusetts, appears on the muster roll of Captain Joseph Smith's company, and in 1776, James Durginn was in the company of Captain Moses MacFarland, Colonel Nixon's regiment. Dr. Samuel Holmes Durgin, born at Parsonsfield, Maine, 1839, was a conspicuous figure in the medical profession, having been a lecturer at the Harvard Medical School since 1884, and president of the American Health Association.

Lyle Durgin was a sister of Harriet Thayer Durgin; the two grew up together, studied in the same schools, and when their education was completed, found themselves with the same inclination toward art. Lyle went to Paris in 1879 and became a pupil of Léon Bonnat and Jules Bastien-Lepage. Later, she entered the Académie Julian for more serious study in drawing, supplementing her studio work by anatomical studies at the Ecole de médecine under Georges Chicotot. In summer time, the sisters sketched in England, Switzerland and France, gaining inspiration from nature and travel, and taking home collections of sketches for their winter's work. Lyle chose figure painting in oil and portraiture as her special interest. She was so diligent with her studies from 1879 to 1884, that the Salon received her paintings in the latter-named year, and again two years later.

== Career ==
In 1886, the Durgin sisters returned to the US and opened a studio in Boston. The first picture exhibited by Lyle in Boston was a portrait of a lady. Then followed in rapid succession one of Henry Sandham, a celebrated artist of Boston, and many others of persons of more or less distinction in the social and literary world. Receiving a commission for mural paintings for a church in Detroit, Michigan, she started early in 1890 for a prolonged course of travel in Italy, finally settling in Paris for the execution of those original works, which were completed and placed in the church in December, 1891. They represent the four Evangelists and are of heroic size, filling the four compartments of the dome-shaped interior. They are painted after the manner of the middle period of the Venetian school, corresponding to the Byzantine character of the edifice. Although the ecclesiastical traditions of saints and church fathers allow for little variation, her works were characterized by freshness, originality and strength.

== Death ==
She died in Boston in 1904. Lyle, Harriet, and their parents were all interred at the Pine Grove Cemetery at Gilmanton Ironworks, Belknap County, New Hampshire.
