= Dorothy Durgin =

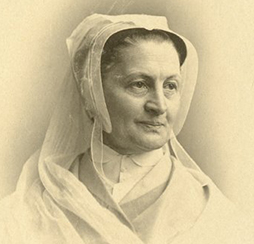
Portrait of Dorothy Durgin

Dorothy Ann Durgin (November 23, 1825 – August 24, 1898) was an American teacher and eldress of the Canterbury Shaker community. She is credited with the design of the "Dorothy Cloak". She also wrote over 500 pages of hymns.

== Biography ==
Dorothy Durgin was born on November 23, 1825, in Sanbornton, New Hampshire, to William Durgin and Dorothy Dearborn Sanborn. She had a brother, Henry. Her mother died when Durgin was eight, at which point she and her brother were adopted by Asa and Abigail Bean, her uncle and aunt. Dorothy and Henry were admitted to the Canterbury Shaker Village on July 13, 1834. She was instructed by Mary Whitcher in the Shaker women's school.

Durgin was a teacher at the Shaker School from 1846 to 1852. Durgin became a Second Eldress under Marcia Hastings in 1852. In 1857, she continued to rise through the ranks and became a First Eldress of the Church Family, and she continued as an Eldress for 46 years. She wrote over 500 pages of hymns.

Durgin is attributed with the design of the "Dorothy Cloak" in around 1890. The loose-fitting, hooded opera cloak was manufactured and sold by Hart and Shepard under the name "The Dorothy" and trademarked their design in New Hampshire in 1901. Other manufacturers included Clarissa Jacobs who made the Dorothy Cloak worn by Frances Cleveland for the second inauguration of her husband, President Grover Cleveland, in 1893. Cloaks continued to be made at Sabbathday Lake until the 1970s.

Eldress Durgin died of cancer on August 24, 1898.
