= Margaret Burnham Geddes =

American architect (1907–1995)

- Born: Margaret Burnham Kelly; 26 September 1907; Evanston, Illinois
- Died: February 18, 1995 (aged 87); Providence, Rhode Island
- Education: Vassar College, Massachusetts Institute of Technology
- Occupations: Architect, Urban Planner, Activist
- Years active: 1930s–1970s
- Spouse: J. Peter Geddes (m. 1942)
- Relatives: Daniel Burnham (grandfather)

Margaret Burnham Geddes (née Kelly; September 26, 1907 – February 18, 1995) was an American architect, urban planner, and activist who worked in Providence, Rhode Island. She designed several early modernist houses in southern New England with partner J. Peter Geddes and worked as a planner for the Providence Redevelopment Agency.

== Early life and education ==
Margaret Burnham Kelly was born on September 26, 1907, in Evanston, Illinois. She was one of five children of George T. Kelly, a graduate of the University of Wisconsin, and Margaret Sherman Burnham, daughter of the architect Daniel Burnham. In December 1921, the widowed Margaret Sherman Kelly married Benjamin Fairchild Stower of Sturbridge, Massachusetts. In 1922, the family relocated to Brown Street on the East Side of Providence, Rhode Island. Margaret Burnham Kelly graduated from the Wheeler School in June 1925.

Kelly entered Vassar College in the fall of 1925 and studied art and mathematics. She was a member of the track team and a news editor for The Vassar Miscellany News. Kelly was elected to Phi Beta Kappa and graduated from Vassar in the spring of 1929.

The following fall, Kelly enrolled as an architecture student at the Massachusetts Institute of Technology in Boston, Massachusetts where she studied under William Emerson, William H. Lawrence, Paul W. Norton, and Frederick Adams. Her unbuilt senior thesis project for “A Beach Development” on Ocean Road in Narragansett, Rhode Island is similar to her later designs in its effective response to the site, careful consideration of circulation, and combination of land use planning and development. Kelly described the project as "modern, very simple and direct, and horizontal in its treatment."

== Architectural and planning career ==
=== Work with Peter Geddes ===
After graduating from MIT, Kelly returned to her family home in Providence, Rhode Island and worked independently for several years. In 1934, she formed an architectural partnership with J. Peter Geddes, who had received his degree in architecture from Columbia University in 1926. The firm Geddes & Kelly worked predominately on residential projects and was active between 1934 and 1948, maintaining an office on the second floor of the Hospital Trust Building on Westminster Street in Providence.

Most of the firm's projects date from 1938 to 1941. The George R. Rowland House (1938) in Brookfield, Massachusetts was their first and largest house project. It is representative of their other work in its simplified version of traditional New England domestic architecture, relying on unadorned brick and bands of casement windows. In 1939, Geddes & Kelly designed two houses on Manning Street Street in Providence, one of which was a residence for Peter Geddes. In 1941, four houses designed by Geddes & Kelly were featured in Pencil Points and Architectural Forum, introducing their work to a national audience. Editors noted the buildings' "clean lines and restful surfaces" and "austere avoidance of decoration." Three of the firm's houses were included in the 1941 “Exhibition of Contemporary Rhode Island Art” at the Rhode Island School of Design Museum.

Kelly and Geddes married on December 3, 1942, at which time Kelly changed her last name to Geddes and moved into the house they had designed at 29 Manning Street. The firm disbanded briefly between 1942 and 1944 due to World War II. During this time, Margaret Geddes worked as a Project Planner for the Federal Public Housing Authority in Washington, DC and as a truck driver employed by the U.S. Army, while Peter Geddes served as an Army engineer in the Pacific.

Peter Geddes formed the partnership Harkness & Geddes with Albert Harkness in 1948. Margaret Geddes worked part-time at the new firm while also pursuing independent commissions. In 1950, she designed the Scott House on Stimson Avenue in Providence. Margaret Geddes's designs were included in a 1950 architecture exhibition sponsored by the Rhode Island chapter of the American Institute of Architects (AIA) at the Providence Art Club, where she was a lifetime member.

=== Planning and preservation work ===
Margaret Geddes left her position at Harkness & Geddes in 1956 when she was hired as a planner for the Providence Redevelopment Agency. Earlier in the 1950s, Margaret Geddes had worked as an urban planning activist and organizer, leading the community planning committee of the League of Women Voters of Providence and serving on the boards of the Providence Redevelopment Agency in 1954 and the Citizens Committee for Redevelopment in 1955.

Once hired, Geddes's principal responsibility at the Providence Redevelopment Agency was project planning for the Constitution Hill rehabilitation area, located on the East Side of the city along North Main Street and the Moshassuck River. She was also instrumental in early efforts to establish a historic zoning area in Providence's College Hill neighborhood, especially along Benefit Street, in collaboration with members of the Providence Preservation Society. She continued to educate members of the League of Women Voters on issues of redevelopment and remained openly supportive of fair housing laws in Rhode Island.

=== Later career ===
Geddes left the Providence Redevelopment agency in 1961, but continued to work on planning and advocacy projects. As a city planning consultant, she worked for various firms such as Blain & Stein and for the Cape Cod sector of the Massachusetts State Plan. She remained active in planning and policy in the 1960s and 70s. In 1964, she served on a panel on urban redevelopment policy at Vassar College, and in 1974 advocated for responsible land use on behalf of the Audubon Society of Rhode Island.

Geddes was a member of the American Institute of Planners and the Rhode Island chapter of the American Institute of Architects from 1940 until her death. She held various leadership positions in the RI AIA including chair of the Public Information Committee from 1949 to 1952, secretary from 1952 to 1954, and chair of the Civic Improvement Committee in 1954, the same year she represented the chapter at the 86th annual AIA convention.

Geddes was involved with the League of Women Voters from 1952 to 1969, serving as the director of the Providence chapter from 1954 to 1956. She was a member of the Vassar Alumnae Council and the Rhode Island Vassar Alumnae Association, serving variously as its president and as the chair of the Class of 1929 Fund.

== Death and legacy ==
Margaret and Peter Geddes promised their home at 29 Manning Street to Brown University in 1966. In 1992 architectural historian William Jordy noted the significance of the building as "an early example of domestic 'modernism' in Providence" and warned against the future demolition of this house to make room for new buildings on campus.

Margaret Geddes died in 1995 at age 87 and is buried at Swan Point Cemetery in Providence.

After her death, the Geddes House became property of Brown University. Brown's Urban Studies Program was housed in the building until 2015 when the university demolished the house to make way for a new Engineering Research Center designed by KieranTimberlake.

== Selected buildings ==
- 1936 - American Brass Company Building, Providence, Rhode Island
- 1938 - George R. Rowland House, Brookfield, Massachusetts
- 1939 - Narragansett Boat Club, Providence, Rhode Island
- 1939 - Geddes House, Manning Street, Providence, Rhode Island (demolished 2015)
- 1939 - Sturges House, Manning Street, Providence, Rhode Island
- 1940 - Albert B. Wells House, Walker Pond, Southbridge, Massachusetts
- 1941 - William C. and Margary D. Harris House, Barrington, Rhode Island
- 1941 - Bachelor's House, Seekonk, Massachusetts
- 1941 - Guest House, Sturbridge, Massachusetts
- 1947 - N.D. Hartzell House (alterations and addition), Tillinghast Place, Nayatt, Barrington, Rhode Island
- 1950 - David C. Scott House, Stimson Avenue, Providence, Rhode Island
- 1952 - G.D. Morgan House, Gaithersburg, Maryland

=== Gallery ===
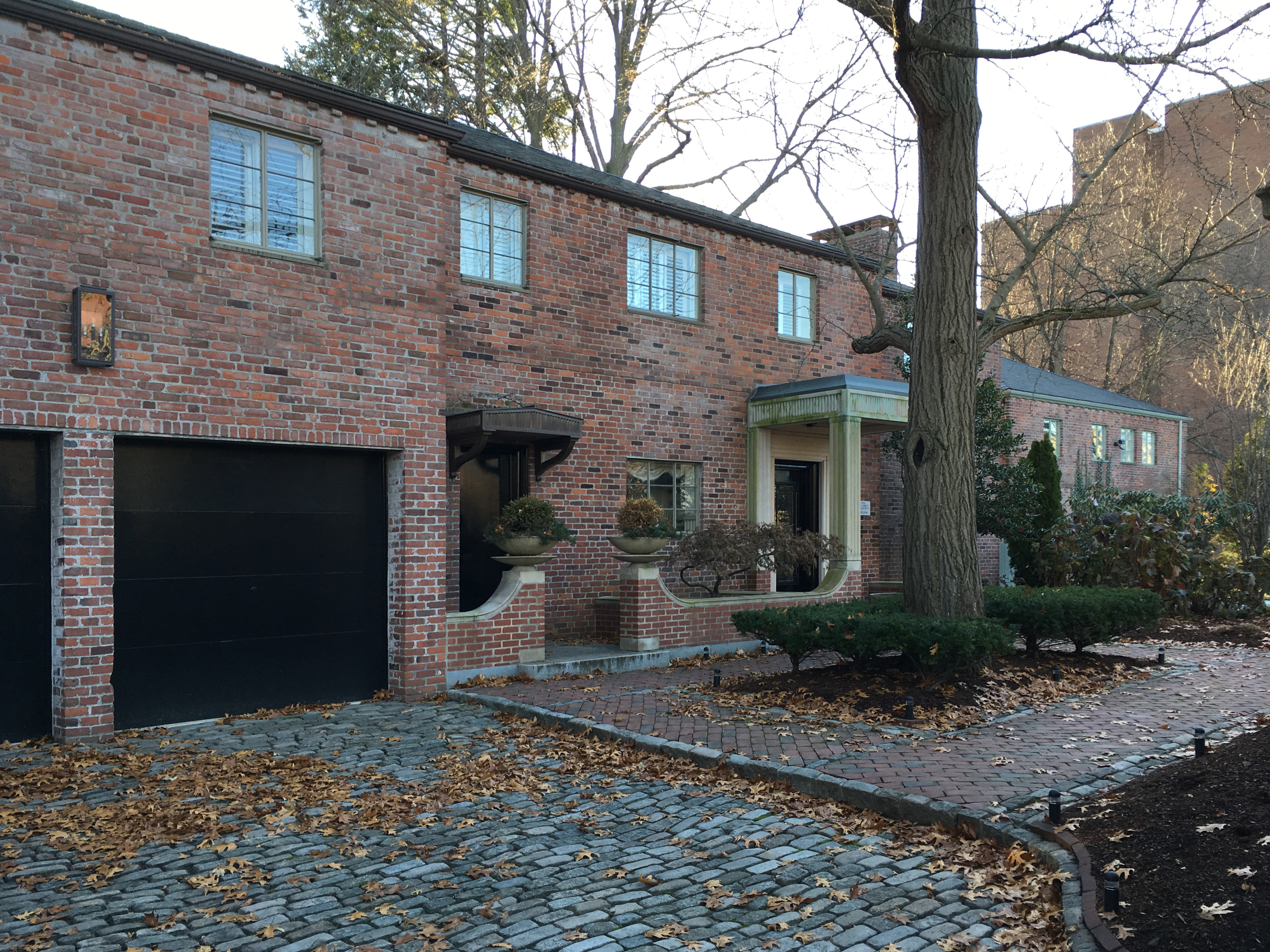
Sturges House

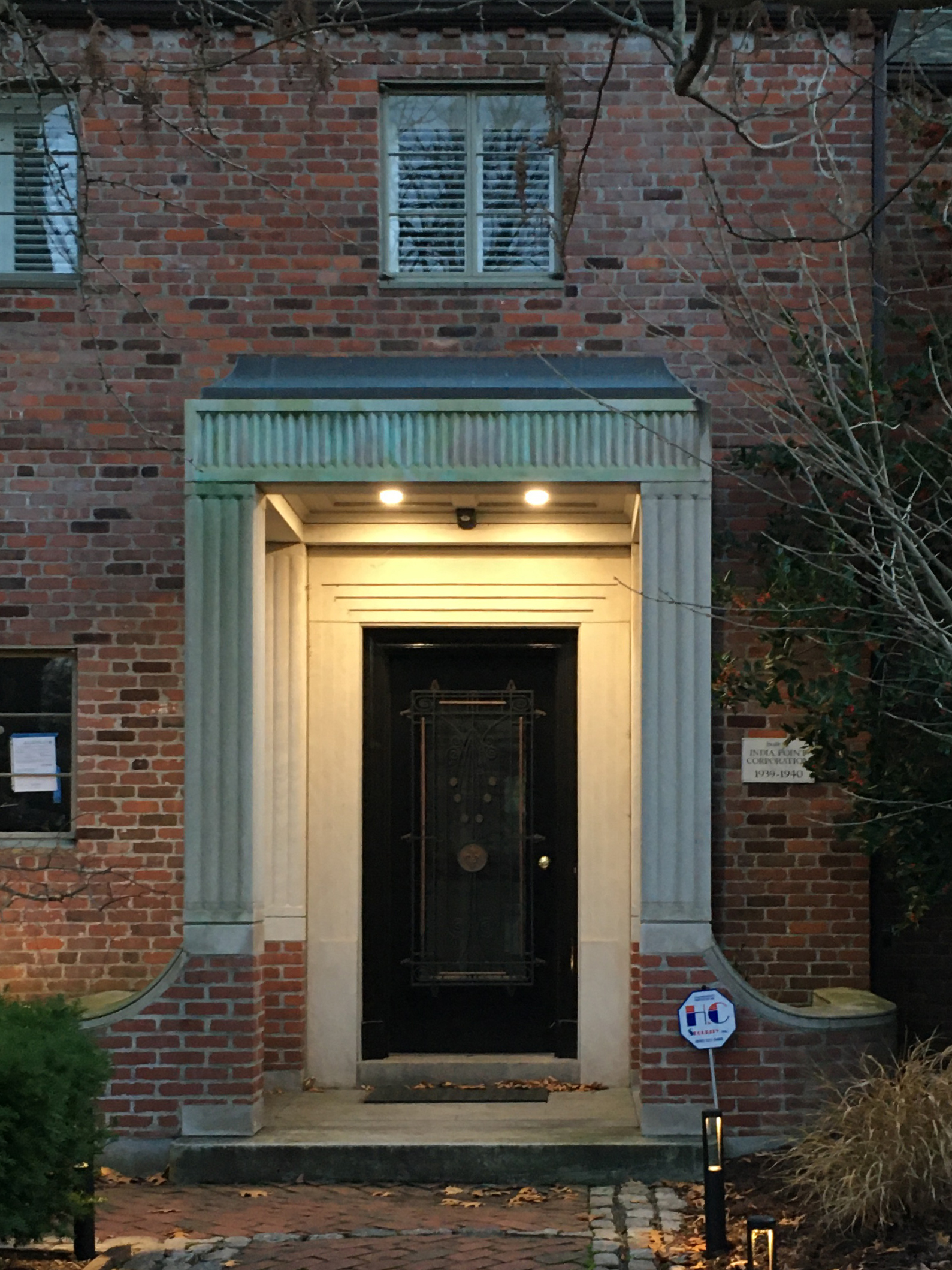
Sturges House, detail

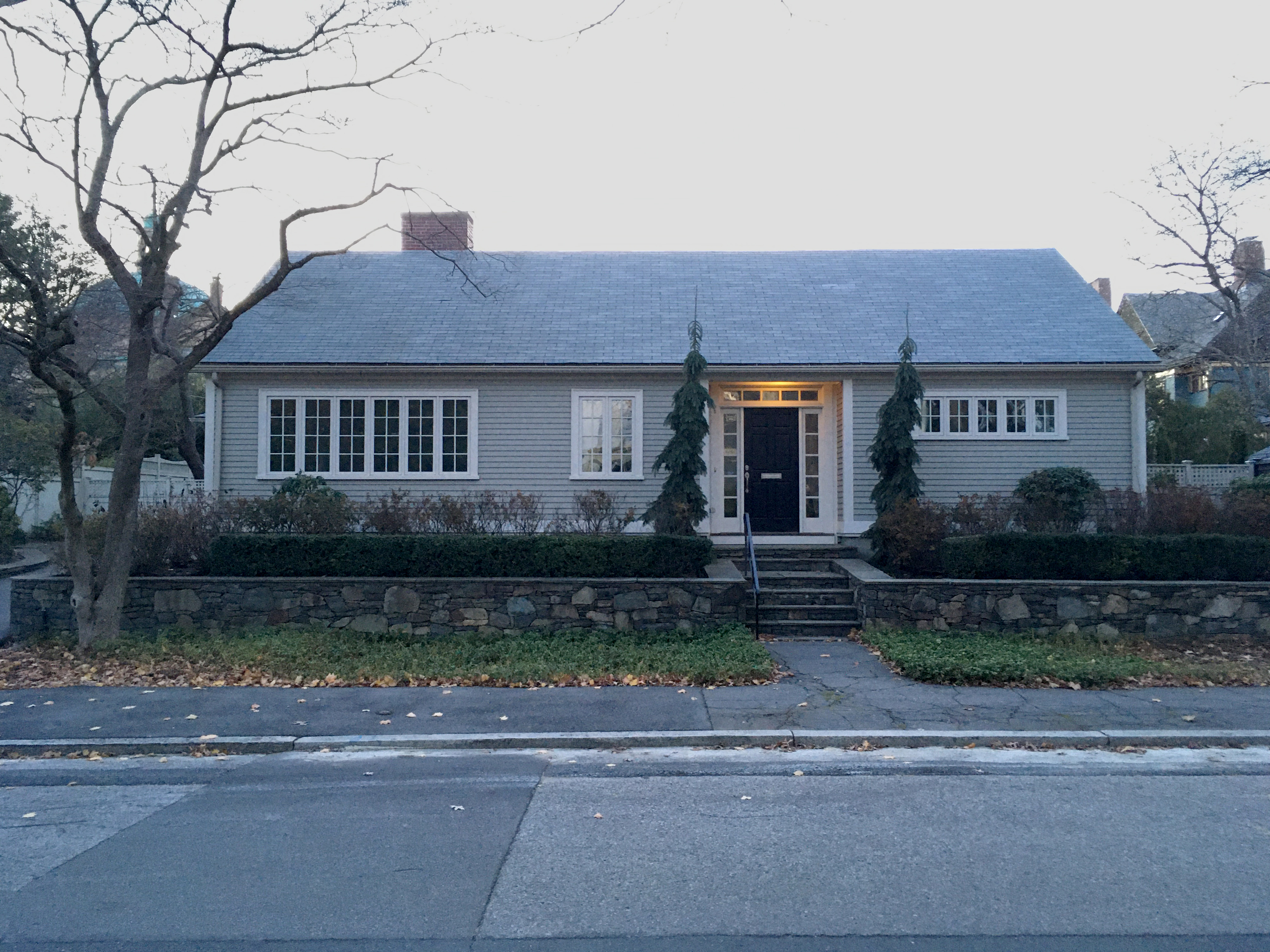
David C. Scott House
