= John Winthrop Platner =

American theologian (1865-1921)

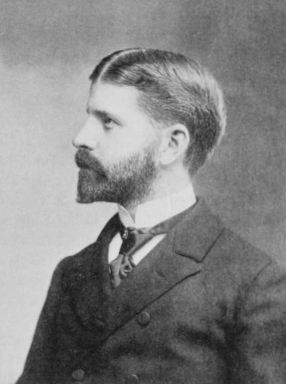
- Born: May 15, 1865; Lee, Massachusetts, US
- Died: March 18, 1921 (aged 55); Cambridge, Massachusetts, US
- Education: Yale College; Union Theological Seminary; Humboldt University of Berlin
- Occupation: Theologian
- Employers: Union Theological Seminary; Harvard University; Andover Theological Seminary
- Spouse: Clara Avery Burnham (m. 1915)

John Winthrop Platner (1865–1921) was an American theologian.

== Early life and education ==
He was born in Lee, Massachusetts, on May 15, 1865. He graduated from Yale College in 1885. He graduated from Union Theological Seminary in 1893. He studied at the Humboldt University of Berlin.

He married Clara Avery Burnham in 1915.

== Career ==
He was an instructor at Union Theological Seminary, and a professor of ecclesiastical history at Harvard University and Andover Theological Seminary.

In a 1927 booklet, Platner was commended for his work helping the Central Congregational Church in Providence, RI during difficult times.

He was elected to the American Academy of Arts & Sciences in 1915.

He died at his home in Cambridge, Massachusetts on March 18, 1921.
