= Nancy Marsh =

Miss Nancy Marsh (May 1, 1817 – December 23, 1890) was a 19th-century missionary, who was well known for her work through the Central Congregational Church, in Providence, Rhode Island, and across the United States.

== Life ==
She was the daughter of Prudence Marsh. She lived for a time in Ware, Massachusetts.

She dedicated her life to missionary work, and was city missionary for Central Congregational Church in Providence. She joined the church on October 31, 1854. In 1902, Church Deacon Moses Torrey wrote "The City Mission of Miss Nancy Marsh cannot be omitted while enumerating some of the devoted laborers who contributed much to the useful character of the church. There were no more earnest prayers and self-denying labors than hers."

In approximately 1882, she founded the Paper Mission, which provided thousands of papers, lessons, lithographs, and pamphlets to remote locations across the country. She was also active in the Temperance Movement, the Seaman's Bethel, and in working with immigrant groups. In 1883, she published guidance for sewing quilts, in particular, to help freed people in the American South.

She died with no family survivors, and her coffin was carried by the deacons of the Central Congregational Church.

== Legacy ==
In 1898, the Marsh Paper Mission was formalized. Its roots trace to Nancy Marsh's work at the Sailors' Bethel in Providence, giving out books and magazines to lighthouses and lightships on the Atlantic Coast. Central Congregational Church's Portuguese Mission grew out of the work of Nancy Marsh. The Church's Communion table was "purchased from the legacy of Miss Nancy Marsh." A plaque on the communion table reads "In Memoriam, Nancy Marsh, 1817—1890, Missionary of this Church for thirty six years, She brought to its communion in loving consecration, A life of singular simplicity and devoted Christian service."
