= Angell Street =

Street in Rhode Island, USA

Coordinates: 41°49′43.3″N 71°23′45.3″W

Angell Street is a major one-way thoroughfare on the East Side of Providence, Rhode Island. It was named for Thomas Angell, an early settler in Providence.

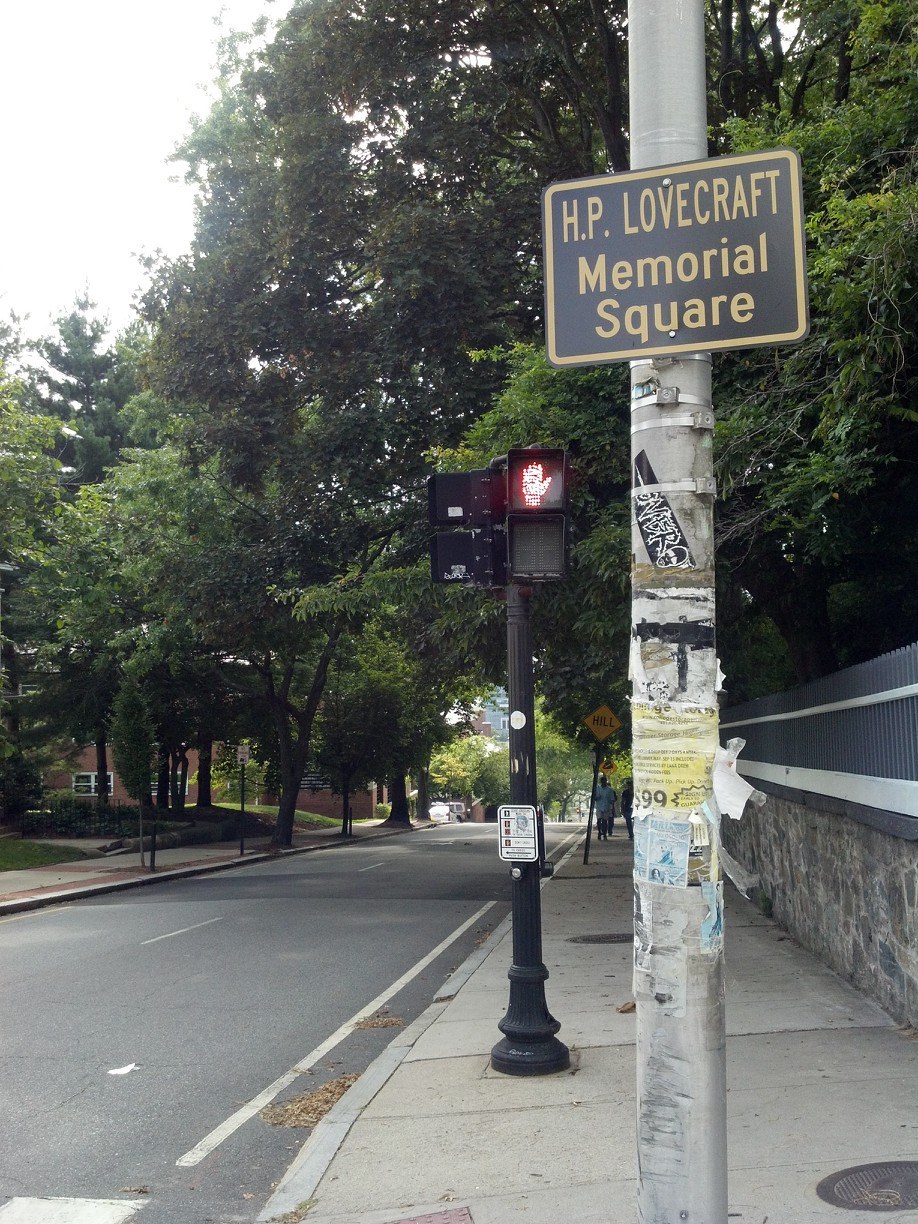
HP Lovecraft Memorial Square intersection of Angell St and Prospect St in Providence.

== Route ==
Angell Street runs roughly east to west across the East Side of Providence. The street begins in Wayland at the Henderson Bridge and extends westward, bisecting the Brown University campus and then continuing down College Hill. The street ends at Benefit Street, immediately east of the First Baptist Church in America, where its path becomes Thomas and later Steeple streets.

Angell intersects other thoroughfares in the area, including Thayer Street and Hope Street.

== Famous inhabitants ==
- George L. Clarke (1813–1890), 10th Mayor of Providence, lived at 95 Angell Street
- Francis W. Carpenter (1831–1922) lived at 276 Angell St
- H. P. Lovecraft (1890–1937) was born at 454 Angell Street lived here in his early childhood. Lovecraft later moved to 598 Angell Street, where he spent an additional two decades.

== Structures ==
- Corliss–Brackett House, 45 Prospect St.
- Lindemann Performing Arts Center, 130 Angell St
- Perry and Marty Granoff Center for the Creative Arts, 154 Angell St.
- Gilder Center for Performing Arts and Prescott Library, Wheeler School
- Hamilton House, 276 Angell St.
- Central Congregational Church, 296 Angell St.
