= Stimson Avenue Historic District =

Historic district in Rhode Island, United States

- U.S. National Register of Historic Places
- U.S. Historic district
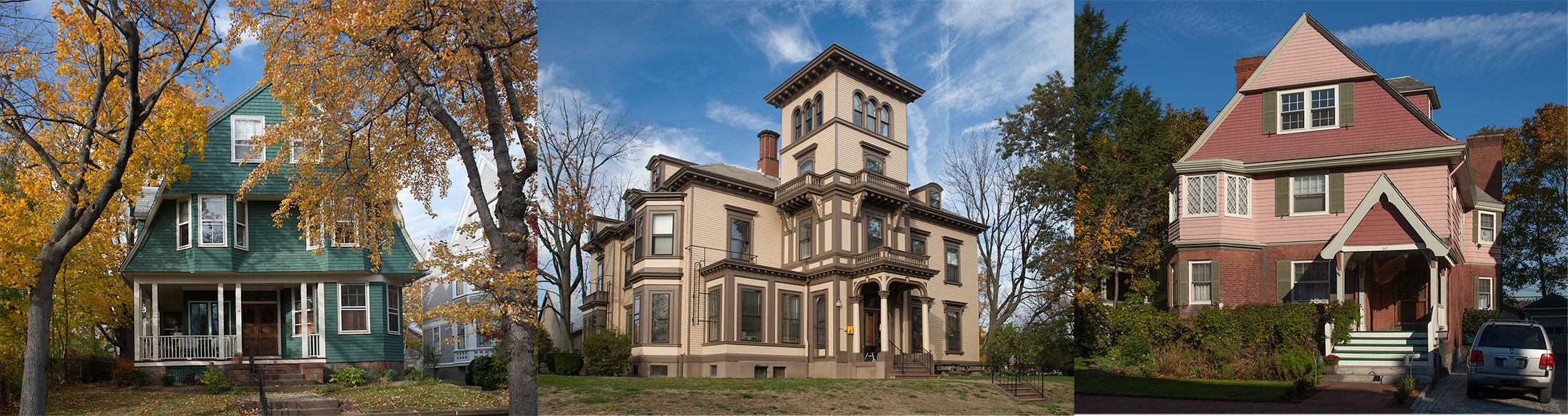

- Location within Rhode Island Location within the United States
- Location: Providence, Rhode Island
- Coordinates: 41°49′42″N 71°23′44″W
- Architect: Multiple
- Architectural style: Late Victorian
- NRHP reference No.: 73000003
- Added to NRHP: April 24, 1973

The Stimson Avenue Historic District is a residential historic district on the east side of Providence, Rhode Island. It includes all of Stimson Avenue and Diman Place, as well as adjacent properties on Angell Street on the south and Hope Street on the west, forming a relatively compact rectangular area. This area was developed roughly between 1880 and 1900, and features a collection of high-quality Queen Anne and Colonial Revival houses, with a few earlier Italianate houses at its edges. Among the finest is 19 Stimson Avenue, built in 1890 to a design by Stone, Carpenter & Willson; it is stylistically transitional between Queen Anne and Colonial Revival, featuring elaborate woodwork and a large number of exterior surface finishes, in a predominantly symmetrical Colonial Revival form. The only non-residential structure is the 1893 brick Central Congregational Church at 296 Angell Street.

The district was listed on the National Register of Historic Places in 1973. It was designated a Providence Historic District in 1981, protecting the properties in the district from inappropriate alteration.

== See also ==
- National Register of Historic Places listings in Providence, Rhode Island
