= Robert W. Burbank =

Attorney General of Rhode Island

Robert Willard Burbank (September 14, 1856 – May 26, 1906) was an American lawyer, and the 49th Attorney General of Rhode Island, serving from 1891 to 1894.

He was born in Koloa, Kingdom of Hawai'i. He attended the Friends' Boarding School in Providence and Brown University, graduating in 1878. He was admitted to the bar in 1880, and practiced law in Providence. He was a member of Central Congregational Church.

He married Martha Anna Taylor on April 12, 1883. He died in 1906 in Rhode Island.
