= Charles W. Huntington =

American Congregational minister

Charles White Huntington
- Born: May 22, 1854; Stockbridge, Massachusetts
- Died: May 23, 1942; Waltham, Massachusetts
- Education: Williams College
- Occupation: Minister
- Spouse(s): Delia Frances Bliss (1881-1910), Emma Hall Ellis (1913-1942)

Charles White Huntington (May 22, 1854 – May 23, 1942) was a notable Congregational minister.

== Early life and education ==
He was born in Stockbridge, Massachusetts, in 1854, the son of Charles Thomas Huntington and Sarah White. He attended the Williston Seminary, and graduated from Williams College in 1876. He was a member of the Kappa Alpha Society and was elected to Phi Beta Kappa. He studied in the law office of C.T. and C.H. Russell in Boston, attended Harvard Law School from 1876–77, and Andover Theological Seminary from 1878–81.

== Ministry ==
After graduating from Andover Theological Seminary, he was ordained in 1881 and served at the following churches:

- Ellsworth Congregational Church, Ellsworth, Maine (1881-1884)
- Central Congregational Church, Providence, Rhode Island (1884-1888)
- High Street Congregational Church, Lowell, Massachusetts (1888-1905)
- Central Congregational Church, Toledo, Ohio (1905-1914)

After retiring, he led services at churches in Newton, Waltham, and Boston, Massachusetts. After serving at First Congregational Church in Waltham, he served as an acting minister in Claremont, California, in 1915. In 1919, he was involved in the Unitarian Church.

In 1894, he compiled a book, The Warren-Clarke Genealogy: A Record of Persons related within the Sixth Degree to the Children of Samuel Dennis Warren and Susan Cornelia Clarke.

He received a D.D. degree from Williams College in 1901. He was a trustee at the Bradford Academy in Bradford, Massachusetts, for ten years.

In 1933, he preached the chapel sermon at the 100th Anniversary of the Kappa Alpha Society, at Williams College.

== Family life ==
He married Delia Frances Bliss in Boston, November 16, 1881. She died January 18, 1910, in Toledo, OH. He married Emma Hall Ellis July 28, 1913, in Toledo, to his death in 1942. He died at his home in Waltham, Massachusetts. He had an adopted daughter, Helen, born in 1890 and adopted in 1910.
