= Lawrence L. Durgin =

American Congregational minister

Lawrence Lazelle Durgin
- Born: September 28, 1918; Newark, New Jersey, U.S.
- Died: August 11, 1981 (aged 62); Jackson, Mississippi, U.S.
- Education: Dartmouth College
- Occupation: Minister
- Spouse: Eunice King
- Children: 2

Lawrence Lazelle Durgin (September 28, 1918 – August 11, 1981) was a Congregational minister and social activist. He was dedicated to racial equality, and was known for his work on "urban and social issues" in New York City.

== Early life and education ==
He was born in Newark, New Jersey to Russell Luther Durgin and Delphine Lazelle. He was raised in Japan until age 6, as his father was secretary of the Y.M.C.A. in Tokyo. He graduated from Dartmouth College in 1940, where he was president of the Dartmouth Christian Union, and from Oberlin School of Theology in 1944. He also studied at Union Theological Seminary. He received an honorary Doctorate of Divinity from Brown University in 1957 and another from Oberlin College.

== Ministry ==
He served the following churches:

- United Church of Cornish, Cornish, New Hampshire
- Orient Congregational Church, Orient Point, New York (1944-1947)
- First Congregational Church, Norwich, New York (c.1948-1952)
- Central Congregational Church, Providence, Rhode Island (1952-1961)
- Broadway United Church of Christ, New York, New York (1961-1980)

He was instrumental in forming a relationship between historically black Tougaloo College in Mississippi and Brown University in his capacity as a minister at Central Church in Providence. After serving on the board of Tougaloo College, he became the Vice President for Development and Public Relations in 1980.

With his wife, he was involved in the founding of Habitat for Humanity. He was also involved in many inter-religious organizations, including the National Council of Churches. He was president of the Rhode Island Council of Churches. He was the moderator of the Metropolitan Association of the United Church of Christ, president of the Manhattan Division of the Council of Churches, and co-founder of the Jerusalem Conference for Christians and Israelis. He served on the boards of the Andover Newton Theological School and the Northfield Mount Hermon School.

== Personal life ==
Durgin married Eunice King (1918–2005) in 1941 and had two children. She was from South Carolina and graduated from the women's college at the University of North Carolina. He died in Tougaloo, Mississippi in 1981, and a funeral was held in the Tougaloo College Chapel.
