= Leonard Swain =

- Born: February 26, 1821; Concord, New Hampshire, U.S.
- Died: July 14, 1869 (aged 48); Providence, Rhode Island, U.S.
- Education: Dartmouth College; Andover Theological Seminary
- Occupation: Minister
- Employer: Central Congregational Church
- Spouse: Julia Maria Allen (m. 1847; died 1866)
- Children: 4

Leonard Swain (February 26, 1821 – July 14, 1869) was a Congregational clergyman, and the first minister of Central Congregational Church in Providence, Rhode Island, from 1852 to 1869. He was a respected preacher, scholar, and author of multiple hymns.

== Early life and education ==
Swain was born Feb. 26, 1821, in Concord, New Hampshire, to Richard Swain and Sarah Sally Damon. He graduated from Dartmouth College, Phi Beta Kappa in 1841, and Andover Theological Seminary in 1846. He received an honorary Doctorate of Divinity from Brown University in 1857.

== Ministry ==
He served as the first minister of the Pearl Street Congregational Church, founded in 1847 in Nashua, New Hampshire. In 1852 he became minister of the Central Congregational Church in Providence, Rhode Island. Swain required that this new church be completely free of debt when he accepted his call.

He wrote five sermons that were published as booklets: Our Banners Set Up (1861), God in the Strife (1861), On the Death of President Lincoln (1865), On the Death of Rowell Park Perry and Lemuel Grosvenor Perry (1867), and God's Ownership of the Sea (1869)

In 1858 two hymns that he wrote were published in the Sabbath Hymn Book (a hymnal), anonymously. His authorship was determined "only recently" before a 1907 Dictionary of Hymnology was published. The two hymns are "My soul, weigh not thy life" (The Good Fight of Faith) and "My soul, it is thy God" (The Christian Race). He also wrote "My soul, whene'er thou shalt arrive", published in about 1840. These hymns appeared in 56, 21, and 2 hymnals, respectively, that were published during 1840 to 1920.

He was "active" in the 1845-founded Rhode Island Institute of Instruction (predecessor of the National Education Association in Rhode Island).

He was the commencement speaker at Wheaton Female Seminary (now Wheaton College) in 1864. He spoke in 1861 on "The Sea", and in 1864 on "Puritan Education". He also gave welcoming addresses in some years.

On Sunday September 29th, 1867, he delivered a sermon commemorating the life of Brown University Professor Robinson Potter Dunn at Central Church.

He also served as secretary for the Evangelical Consociation of Rhode Island and was Vice President of the American Missionary Association.

== Personal life ==
In 1847, he married Julia Maria Allen (1824-1866). Their children included Susan Helen Swain (1849–1852), Julia Maria Swain (1851–1932), Sarah Howe Swain (1853–1872), and Edward Allen Swain (1857–1917).

On May 1st, 1869, the Vermont Chronicle reported that he was "understood to be lying at the point of death, with consumption." He died July 14, 1869, in Providence, while still minister. He was buried in Swan Point Cemetery.
