= Gregory Dexter Walcott =

Gregory Dexter Walcott (1869–1959) was an American academic and minister.

He was born in Lincoln, Rhode Island.

He was educated at the Worcester Academy, and graduated from Brown University. He studied at Columbia University and Union Theological Seminary, earning degrees from each school, and a PhD in 1904.

He served as assistant minister at Central Congregational Church in Providence, Rhode Island.

He was a professor and later dean at Blackburn College, and later a professor and chair at Hamline University. In 1917–1918, he served as a visiting professor at Tsing Hua College in Beijing. Some of his lectures have been published as books.
