= Frank Gardner Moore =

- Born: September 25, 1865; West Chester, Pennsylvania
- Died: November 18, 1955 (aged 90); Cleveland, Ohio
- Spouse: Anna Barnard White

Academic background
- Education: B.A. Yale, 1886; Ph.D., 1890; study at Berlin, 1890-1; L.H.D. Trinity Coll. (Hartford, CT), 1921; Litt. D. Columbia, 1929
- Thesis: De societatis quam vocant initiis, sive quomodo scriptores antiqui, praesertim Plato, Aristoteles, Lucretius, societatis origines habuerint

Academic work
- Discipline: Latinist

Frank Gardner Moore (1865–1955) was an American Latin scholar. After teaching at Yale University, Dartmouth College, and Trinity College, Connecticut, he became a professor of Classical Philology at Columbia University.

== Early life and education ==
Moore was the brother of Edward Caldwell Moore and George Foot Moore. Born in West Chester, Pennsylvania in 1865, he was educated at Yale University, where he earned his (A.B. in 1886 and Ph.D. in 1890. He then pursued further studies at the University of Berlin from 1890 to 1891.

He married Anna Barnard White on January 4, 1897.

== Academic career ==
Moore was a Latin tutor at Yale between 1888 and 1893, assistant professor of Latin from 1893 to 1900 and associate professor of Latin and Roman archaeology from 1900 to 1908 at Dartmouth College, and professor of Latin at Trinity College, Hartford, Connecticut from 1908 to 1910). During the latter year, he was appointed professor of classical philology at Columbia University.

He edited the Transactions and the Proceedings of the American Philological Association, of which he became secretary in 1904 and president in 1917. Moore wrote a translation with notes of Roman historian Livy for the Loeb Classical Library. He also edited Cicero's Cato Major (1904) and Tacitus' Historics (1910).
