= Wells State Park (Massachusetts) =

State park in Massachusetts, United States

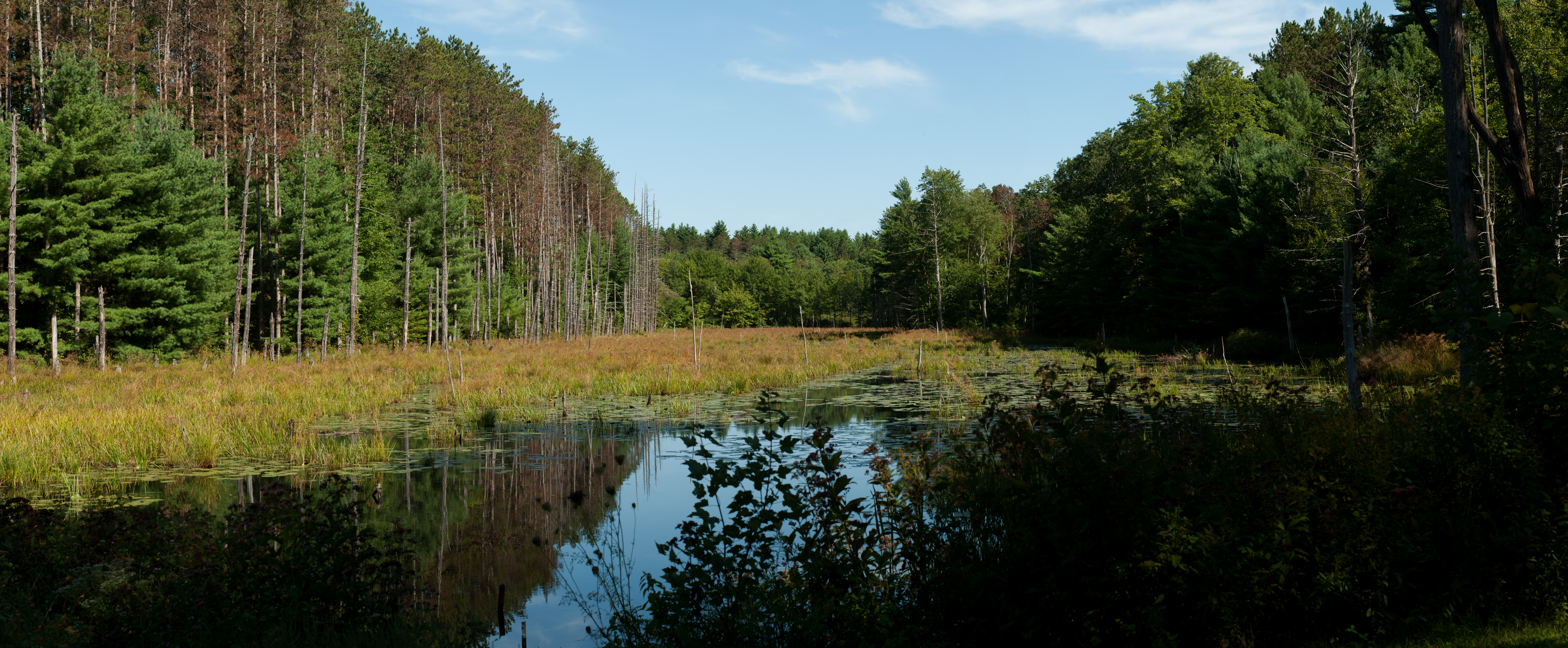

- Location within Massachusetts Location within the United States
- Location: Sturbridge, Massachusetts, United States
- Coordinates: 42°08′45″N 72°04′06″W
- Area: 1,445 acres (585 ha)
- Elevation: 869 ft (265 m)
- Established: 1968
- Administrator: Massachusetts Department of Conservation and Recreation
- Website: Official website

Wells State Park is a public recreation area located off Route 49 in the town of Sturbridge, Massachusetts. The state park includes frontage on Walker Pond and the scenic metamorphic rock cliff face of Carpenter Rocks. Terrain is rugged with ledges interspersed between wetlands. Woodlands are of the oak-hickory forest and northern hardwood forest types with groves of eastern white pine. The park is managed by the Massachusetts Department of Conservation and Recreation.

== Activities and amenities ==
The park offers 12 miles (19 km) of trails for hiking, mountain biking, horseback riding, and cross-county skiing. A notable trail leads to the cliffs of Carpenter Rocks, named after John Carpenter, who built and operated a sawmill nearby. Vistas include the eastern section of Walker Pond and surrounding wooded valley. Walker Pond's 104 acres (42 ha) provide opportunities for boating and fishing. A 60-site campground includes a swimming beach for campground users. The park also offers restricted hunting and seasonal interpretive programs.
