= Fuller Iron Works =

American manufacturer

The Fuller Iron Works was a manufacturer of various metal parts in Providence, Rhode Island.

The company was founded in 1840 by Frederick Fuller. After his death in 1865, it was controlled by his sons, Frederic Fuller (b. 1825) and George Fuller until George's death in 1894. From that point forward, Frederic Fuller served as president while son Frederic Henry Fuller (1847-1936) served as vice president, and H. Clinton Fuller (b. 1856) served as treasurer.

Frederic H. Fuller was the last "life deacon" of the Central Congregational Church in Providence, serving from 1885-1936. He was also involved in the church's construction of a new building in the early 1890s. At a church meeting on February 6, 1919, he read a paper entitled "The Interior Decoration of the Central Congregational Church."

It had many distinct operations, including a shop on South Main Street and Tockwotten Street and on Pike and Benefit Streets.
