= Helen Hogan Coome =

Helen Hogan Coome (15 June 1883 – 27 April 1948) was a British-American female organist.

Coome was born in Stockport, then Cheshire, the daughter of James Hogan and Sara Helen Wilby.

She was a pupil of or connected to Marco Enrico Bossi in Italy, and Joseph Bonnet and Charles Marie Widor in France. She was also connected with Philippe in France and Matthay in England, and Gedalge in Paris.

At age 12, she worked at First Methodist Church in Pawtucket. She was the organist and choirmaster at Central Congregational Church in Providence, Rhode Island from 1904–1928. She founded the church's Girls Choir in 1912

In 1933, she married Englishman Cecil Victor Coome and moved to London.

During World War II, she helped residents of London recover from the bombings of The Blitz. She later commissioned a stained glass pendant for Central Congregational Church in gratitude for the church's work helping England during the war. The pendant has resided in the sanctuary of Central Church since 1950.

She died in London in 1948.
