= William Croft Wilson =

American Congregationalist minister (1931–1963)

William Croft Wilson (May 31, 1931 – November 6, 1963) was an American Congregational minister, and the namesake of Wilson Chapel at Central Congregational Church in Providence, Rhode Island.

== Life ==
He was born at Greenwich Hospital, the son of William Stavely Wilson and Winifred Graham Croft. His father was an executive at Janney, Montgomery and Scott.

He attended Choate School, and performed at the Bushnell Memorial as a member of the Glee Club in 1950. He graduated from Haverford College in 1954, and from Yale Divinity School in 1957.

He was ordained at Second Congregational Church in Greenwich, Connecticut, and served as minister at Central Congregational Church from 1957 until his death in 1963. His death was due to problems with his heart, and he was treated at Johns Hopkins Hospital by Dr. Helen Taussig.

== Legacy ==
His father established the William Croft Wilson Memorial Award at the Greenwich Boys Club. The William C. Wilson Scholarship is now an endowed scholarship at the Boys & Girls Club of Greenwich.

His family endowed the William C. Wilson Scholarship at Yale Divinity School for students preparing to be Christian ministers.
