= Edward Caldwell Moore =

American theologian

- Born: October 15, 1851; West Chester, Pennsylvania
- Died: 1943
- Education: Marietta College
- Occupations: Minister, theologian

Edward Caldwell Moore (1851–1943) was an American theologian, brother of George Foot Moore and Frank Gardner Moore.

== Early life and education ==
He was born at West Chester, Pa., the son of the Rev. William Eves Moore and his wife, Harriet. He graduated from Marietta College in 1877 and from Union Theological Seminary in 1884; and studied at Berlin, Göttingen, and University of Giessen from 1884 to 1886. He received an honorary PhD from Brown University in 1891.

== Career ==
Ordained to the Presbyterian ministry in 1884, he was pastor at the Westminster Presbyterian Church in Yonkers, N. Y. (1886–1889), and at the Central Congregational Church of Providence, R. I. (1889–1901), where he led the church in constructing a new building. In the latter year he became Parkman professor of theology at Harvard, where he was university preacher in 1905–1906. In 1914 he was elected president of the American Board of Commissioners for Foreign Missions. His publications include The New Testament in the Christian Church (1904) and An Outline of the History of Christian Thought since Kant (1912). In 1926, he was awarded an honorary doctorate by the Faculty of Theology in Giessen.
