= Edward Frederick Sanderson =

- Born: March 16, 1874; Cleveland, Ohio
- Died: October 31, 1955; Nantucket, Massachusetts
- Education: Amherst College
- Occupation: Minister
- Spouse(s): Ethel Eames (1912-1917); Grace Jarvis Schauffler (1934-1955)
- Children: David Eames Sanderson

Edward Frederick Sanderson (March 16, 1874 – October 31, 1955) was a Congregational minister and one of the founders of Goodwill Industries. He was also notable for his early support of the Nantucket Whaling Museum.

== Early life and education ==
He was born in Cleveland, Ohio, the son of Frederick Milton Sanderson and Harriet Pierce White. His father was a captain in the Union Army during the Civil War, and later, a successful businessman in Cleveland.

He attended high school in Cleveland, graduated from Amherst College in 1896 and Hartford Theological Seminary in 1899. He served as a corporal in the First Connecticut Volunteer Infantry during the Spanish–American War.

== Ministry ==
Sanderson was ordained on June 27, 1899, and served at Washington Street Congregational Church in Beverly, Massachusetts (1899-1903), Central Congregational Church in Providence, Rhode Island (1903-1908), and at Church of the Pilgrims in Brooklyn, New York (1909-1915).

From approximately 1906–1909, he was a trustee of Atlanta University. He was one of the founders of the New York Goodwill in 1915, and served as its first president. He was president of Charles Sprague Smith's People's Institute in New York from 1916 to 1922. He was also involved with the Brooklyn City Mission Society. He preached at Wellesley College in 1915.

== Personal life ==
He married Ethel Eames (1877-1917) on June 29, 1912, in Kennebunkport, Maine. She was the daughter of Francis L. Eames, who was president of the New York Stock Exchange, and Sarah Wright Eames. Together, they had a son, David Eames Sanderson (1916-1970).

He retired to Nantucket in the 1920s and was a major benefactor of the Nantucket Whaling Museum, collecting and donating artifacts related to whaling. In 1934, he married Grace Jarvis Schauffler, who was the widow of a colleague. He died in Nantucket on October 31, 1955, survived by his wife, son and two siblings.
