= Moses E. Torrey =

US banker (1827–1907)

Moses Eddy Torrey
- Born: 1827; Connecticut, United States
- Died: 1907 (aged 79–80); Providence, Rhode Island, United States
- Occupation: Banker
- Known for: Manager of the Providence Clearing House, first president of the Providence Bank Clerks Mutual Benefit Association
- Spouse: Amelia M. Wilson
- Children: 2 daughters

Moses Eddy Torrey (1827–1907) was an important citizen in Providence, Rhode Island. At the time of his death, at age 80, The New York Times called him "the oldest banker in Providence."

He was born in Connecticut to Reuben Torrey and Anna Eddy.

He started his banking career in the Roger Williams National Bank. He was a cashier for 40 years until the bank became part of the Industrial Trust Company. He was the manager of the Providence Clearing House when it was established in 1880.

He was the first president of the Providence Bank Clerks Mutual Benefit Association.

He was a member of Central Congregational Church for almost 50 years, and served as treasurer for 30 years. For the church's 50th anniversary in 1902, he gave a historical address as a Deacon.

He married Amelia M. Wilson and had two daughters. He died in his home on College Hill
