= Hamilton House (Providence, Rhode Island) =

American nonprofit organization

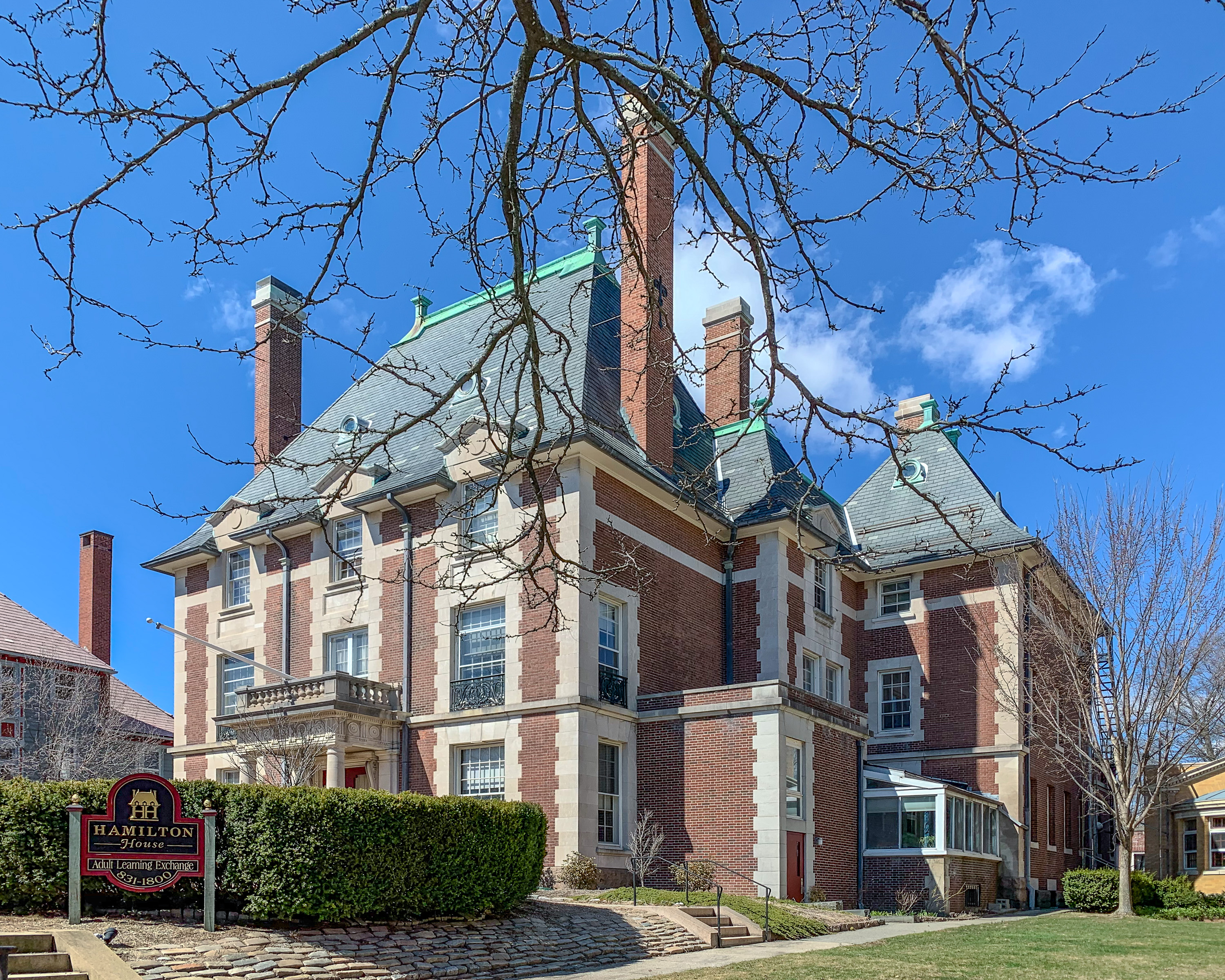
- Company type: Non-profit
- Founded: 1972
- Headquarters: 276 Angell Street; Providence, Rhode Island
- Key people: Chloe Clasper-Torch, Executive Director
- Number of employees: 3
- Website: Hamilton House

Hamilton House is a non-profit organization under the provisions of the Internal Revenue Service Code, Section 501(c)(3). In existence for over 50 years, Hamilton House's mission is to "provide a program center for older persons, without discrimination on grounds of race, creed, color or gender and to offer a wide variety of activities that enhance the meaning, pleasure and health of retirement years".

As a program center for people 55 year of age and older, Hamilton House offers enrichment advantages for active men and women by giving its members opportunities for self-expression and intellectual pursuits in a creative environment. Programs in art, foreign languages, computer classes, music appreciation, book clubs, fitness programs, crafts and stimulating games are offered, as well as professional presentations relating to social issues, humanities, health information and other pertinent issues.

Hamilton Houses membership ranges in age from 55 to 105, with a large percentage of the membership in their mid-70s to mid-80s. The objective of Hamilton House is to keep seniors in their homes longer rather than having to go to costly assisted-living facilities earlier than may be necessary. It is an independently run, member-sustained center dedicated to keeping the years of later life stimulating, fruitful and fulfilling.

== Facility ==
Hamilton House is located at 276 Angell Street on Providence's east side in a stately French château, built in 1896 by local businessman, Francis W. Carpenter. The architects for this house were Carrere and Hastings, who also designed the New York Public Library, the House and Senate office buildings on Capitol Hill and Central Congregational Church, which is located next to Hamilton House.
