= Central Congregational Church (Providence, Rhode Island) =

- U.S. Historic district – Contributing property
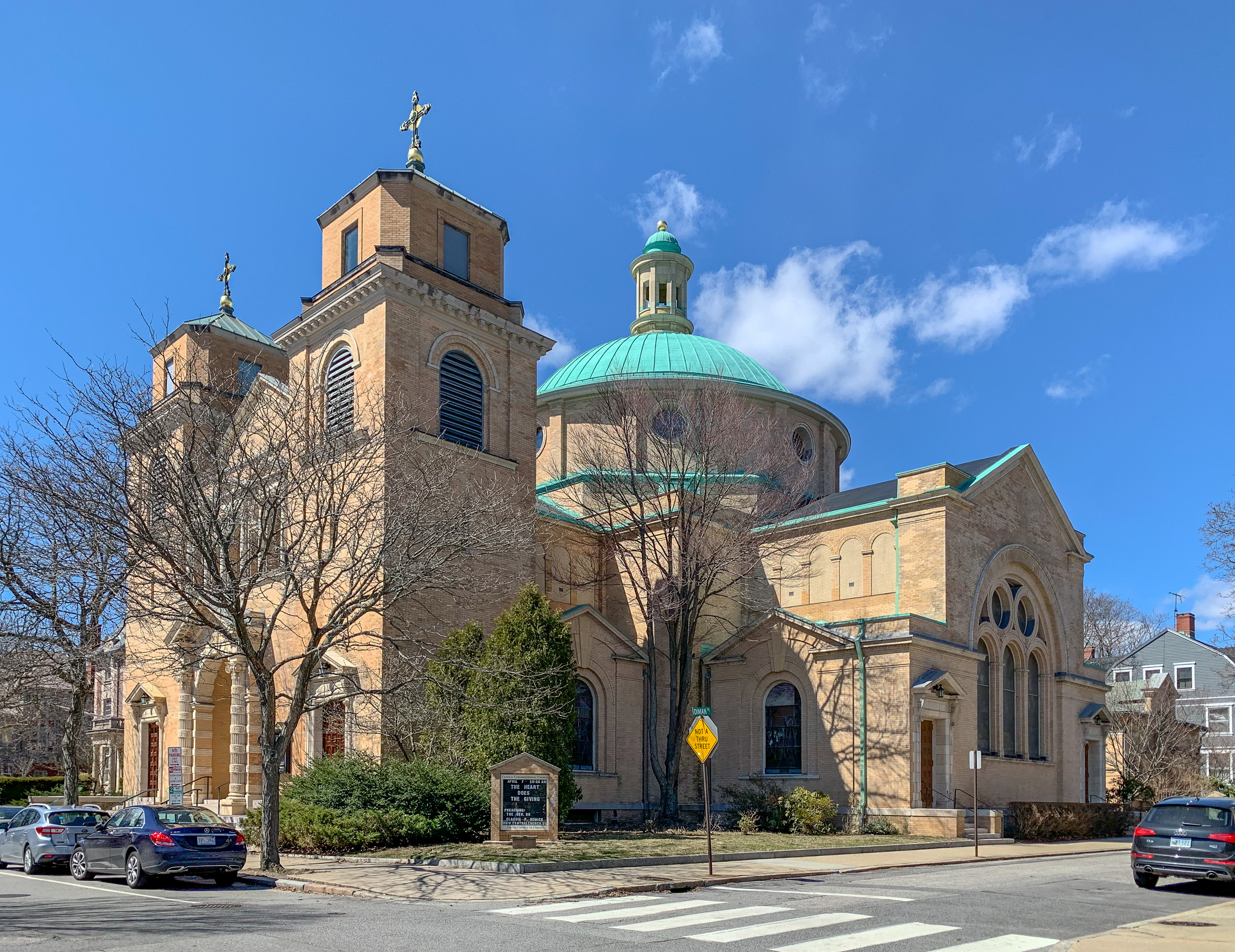
- Location: 296 Angell Street, Providence, Rhode Island
- Coordinates: 41°49′44″N 71°23′45″W
- Built: 1893
- Architect: Carrère and Hastings
- Architectural style: Renaissance Revival
- Part of: Stimson Avenue Historic District (ID73000003)
- Added to NRHP: April 24, 1973

Central Congregational Church is a United Church of Christ congregation established in 1852 in Providence, Rhode Island. The current church building at 296 Angell Street was built in 1893, designed by New York architectural firm Carrère and Hastings. It is part of the Stimson Avenue Historic District. The church has a long tradition of social and community work in the Providence area, the United States and around the world.

== History ==
The church’s history traces back to the 1830s, when Providence Congregationalists sought a new place of worship on the east side of the river. They received a charter for the Benefit Street Congregational Society in 1836 but faced difficulties obtaining land. The organization received a new charter in 1850, and changed its name to the Central Congregational Society in 1851. Among the early leaders in the church were John Kingsbury, William J. King, George L. Claflin, William J. Cross, and Nancy Marsh. The church called the Rev. Leonard Swain from Nashua, New Hampshire to be its minister in 1852. Rev. Swain insisted that the church pay off all its debts before he accepted his call. Rev. Swain was "a man of rare intellectual power and attainment, commanding a sustained hearing among men of prominence in the city, men who disagreed with him radically as to his strictness and to his views of life and conduct, yet who came to hear the greatest preacher in Providence." Leonard Swain died at age 48 in 1869, while serving as minister.

For the church’s 50th anniversary in 1902, longtime deacon Moses E. Torrey wrote of the founding of the church and the pastorate of Leonard Swain. After Torrey’s address, the Rev. George Harris, the Rev. Charles W. Huntington, and the Rev. Edward Caldwell Moore each wrote of their successive pastorates. During Moore's tenure, the church made the transition from its original Benefit Street building to a new edifice on Angell Street and Diman Place. Rev. Moore resigned to become Parkman Professor of Theology at Harvard University in 1902, the year of the church’s 50th anniversary. At this time, Gregory D. Walcott was the Assistant Minister, and the diaconate consisted of Moses E. Torrey, Edwin Barrows, Thomas B. Stockwell, John W. Danielson, Frederic H. Fuller, Arthur W. Fairchild, Frederick H. Jackson, and James C. Kimball.

The church supported the founding of the first Cape Verdean Protestant church in America, now called Sheldon Street Church.

The church published a paper for its 75th anniversary in 1927. The paper notes early members John Kingsbury, William J. King, William J. Cross, William Viall, Abner Gay, Shubael Hutchins, and Frederick Fuller. It also mentions Amos D. Smith, James Y. Smith, William Foster, Samuel Foster, Robert H. Ives, and Alexander Duncan who were not members, but were actively involved in the church.

== Architecture ==
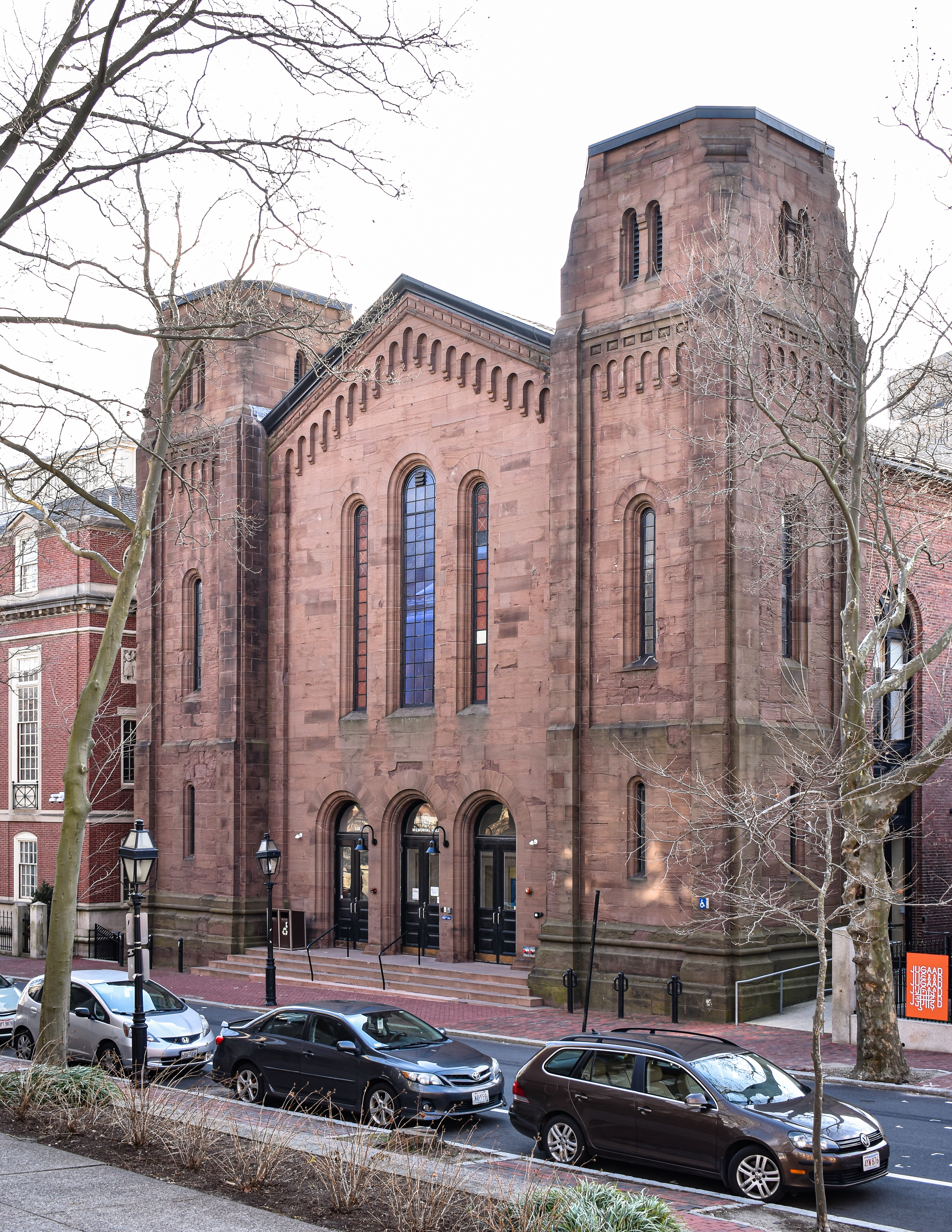
1853 building on Benefit Street (Memorial Hall)

=== Original Building ===
The original building of Central Congregational Church is a brownstone Romanesque structure at 226 Benefit Street, designed by Thomas Tefft and built from 1853-1856. The site was determined by a building committee of James Y. Smith, John Kingsbury, and William Foster, with a groundbreaking in 1851. The Congregation outgrew this building in the College Hill Historic District, and moved to its current location in the 1890s. The old building is now part of the Rhode Island School of Design, and is known as Memorial Hall.

=== Current Building ===
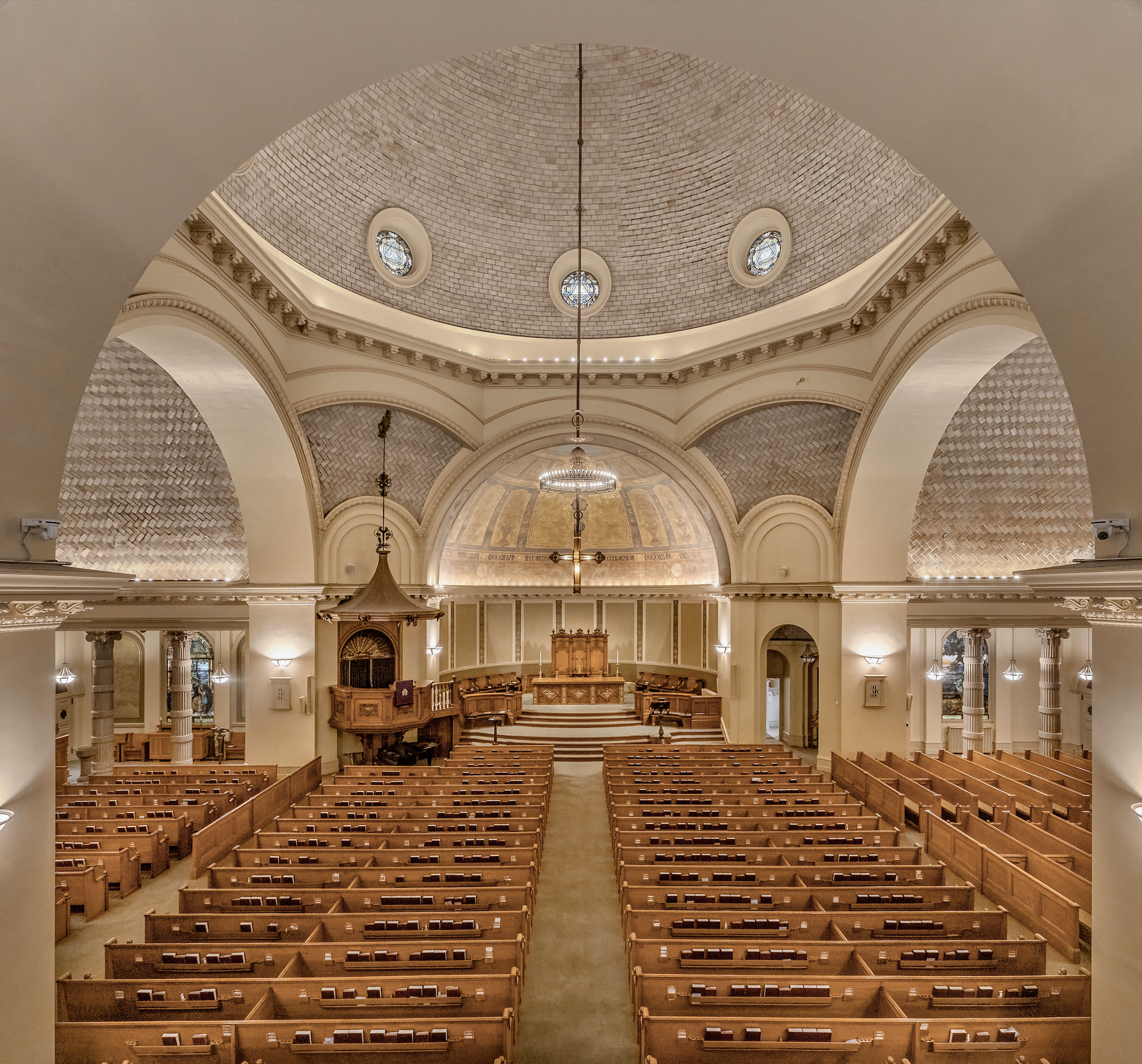
View from the choir loft

A committee of Francis W. Carpenter, John W. Danielson, Frederic Fuller, Frederick C. Sayles, and Frederic Talbot recommended the move to the corner of Angell Street and Diman Place. For the new building, architect Thomas Hastings and minister Edward C. Moore wanted to use the Renaissance style for its historical associations. The cornerstone was laid in July 1891, and the building was dedicated in November 1893. Franklin J. Sawtelle served as supervising and constructing architect.

The dome and vaulting of the current structure is of tiles by Rafael Guastavino, it is the first dome that he constructed in the U.S. The dome and vaulting originally featured exposed red Guastavino tile on its exterior, but this was later covered with copper. The original towers were damaged in storms, and were replaced in 1958.

The interior features oak woodwork. Some work was completed by Pottier & Stymus.

The primary interior decoration is focused on the pulpit and the chancel.

==== Chancel ====
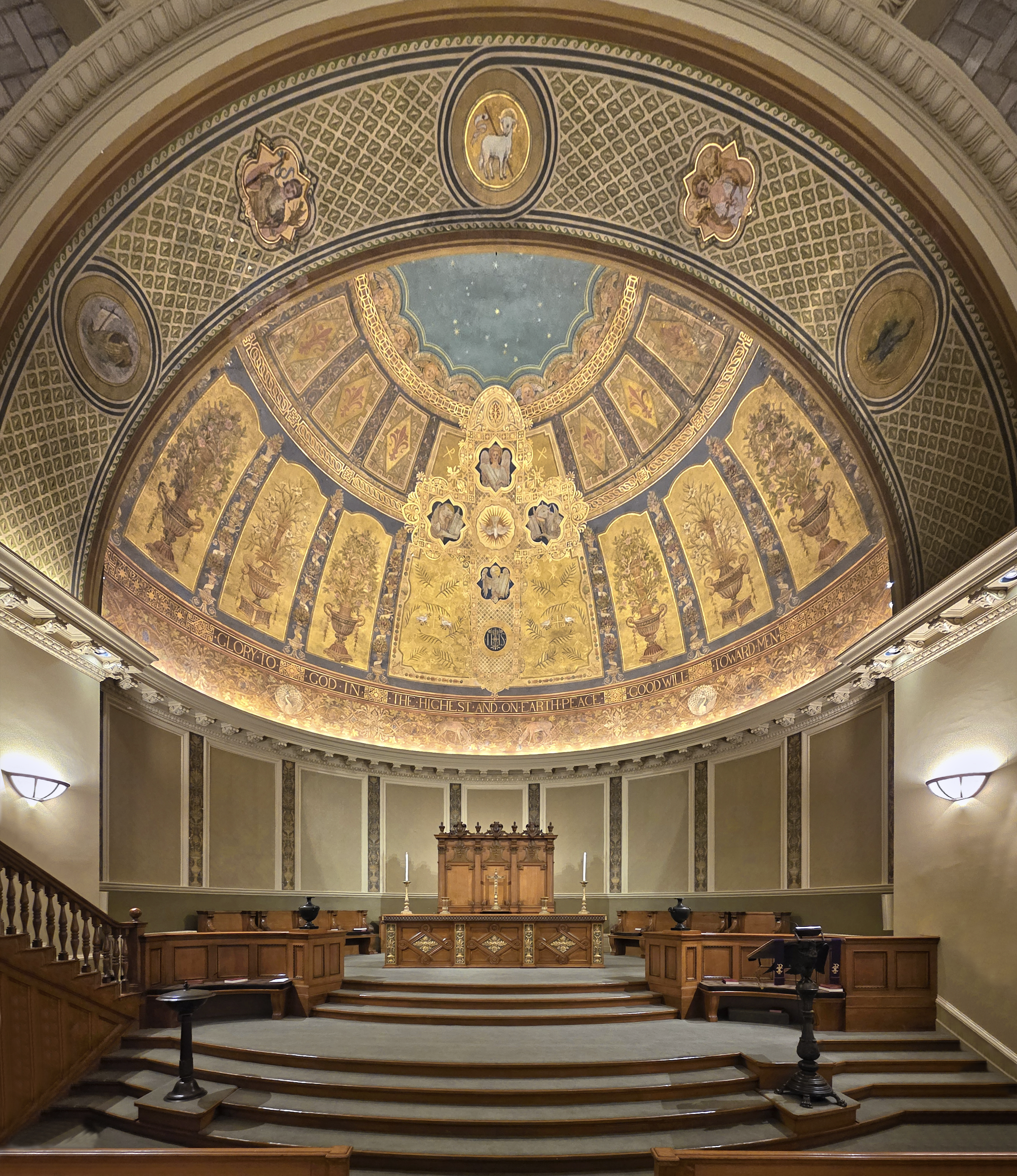
Chancel

Francis W. Carpenter funded the chancel apse decoration, which was executed by Herman T. Schladermundt of New York. The First Century of Central Congregational Church (1952) describes the painted scenes:

As one gazes upward, one sees the Lamb of God in the center of the arch, with Providence, in the shape of a beautiful woman expressing God’s loving care, on one side, and Virtue, strong and courageous in helmet and breast plate, on the other. Within the circular dome a magnificent cross, the great symbol of Christianity, stands out against a golden yellow background—yellow for the sun, and the goodness of God, for marriage, and faith, and fruitfulness. In the exact center of the cross is a dove representing the Holy Spirit, while the Four Evangelists are painted on the four arms. St. Matthew is pictured as a man, for his Gospel tells of the humanity of Christ’s ministry; St. Mark is portrayed with a lion’s head because of his leonine Gospel of the Kingship of Christ; St. Luke is represented with the head of an ox, the animal traditionally used in sacrifice, as his Gospel emphasizes the priesthood and sacrifice of Jesus; while St. John in the form of an eagle expresses the divinity of Jesus. The familiar letters IHS at the foot of the cross have for centuries stood for Jesus the Savior of Mankind. Three narrow panels on the right and left side of the center are filled with multicolored plants or shrubs in full bloom, which suggest not only the beauty of the Christian church, but recall the innumerable references in the Bible to the beauties of Nature. Around the base of the dome, the artist painted in soft colors a wide luxuriant vine to remind the worshipper of the best loved sayings of Christ: “I am the vine, and ye are the branches.” Two deer, sipping of the living waters against the vine, and two peacocks, symbolical of immortality, add to the richness of the border. Underneath runs the glorious song of the angels on the night that Christ was born: “Glory to God in the Highest and on Earth Peace, Good Will toward Men.”

The communion table was "purchased from the legacy of Miss Nancy Marsh." The Gorham bronze lectern was a gift of the Young People's Societies.

==== Stained Glass ====
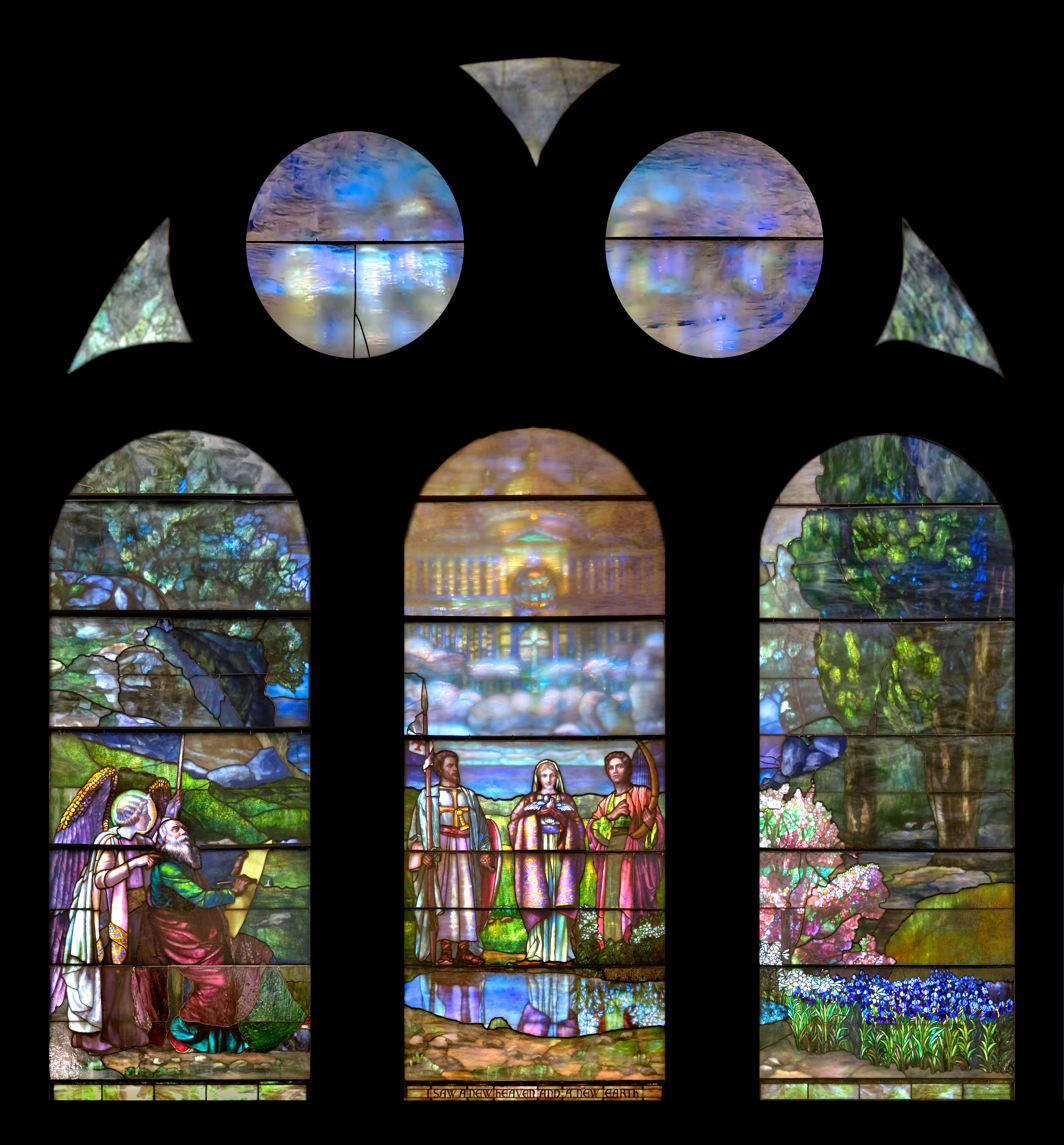
Window of the Heavenly City

The round stained-glass windows under the dome were the work of the Decorative Stained Glass Company, and were installed when the church was built.

The larger stained-glass windows were designed by Jacob Holzer with work by the Duffner and Kimberly Company, and were installed over several years in the early 20th century. They depict the creation of the earth in the east and the heavenly city in the west, and are described as 'unsurpassed in the state.' The First Century of Central Congregational Church (1952) provides a description of the window plan:

During the pastorate of the Rev. Edward F. Sanderson, and at the suggestion of Professor Adelaide Locke of Wellesley College, a plan was adopted to insure advance harmony and unity in the preparation of the stained glass windows which might presently be given as memorials. The central theme of the windows is the unfolding of divine life in the universe. Thus, the Window of Light on the wall of the East Transept, the gift of the children of Mr. and Mrs. Frederick Clark Sayles, and the Window of the Heavenly City, directly opposite on the west wall, the gift of Mr. Francis W. Carpenter, together symbolize the beginning and the culmination of Christian endeavor. Six smaller windows represent the great forces of the universe through which the purpose of the Church may be fulfilled. Commencing with the window on the north wall of the West Transept, and moving around the Church toward the right, the windows may be identified as follows: the Window of Prayer, the gift of Mr. Arthur Claflin and Mr. George Claflin, in memory of Mr. and Mrs. George Lyman Claflin; the Window of Labor, on the north side of the East Transept, the gift of the children of Mr. and Mrs. Henry W. Wilkinson; the Window of Prophecy, on the south side of the East Transept, the gift of Mrs. Harriet N. Lathrop, in tribute to the women who have made this a missionary church; the Window of Loyalty and Sacrifice, on the east wall of the Nave, the gift of the people of the Church as a memorial to those who served in the First World War; The Window of Love, on the west side of the Nave, the gift of Mrs. Robert W. Burbank and Mr. Caleb Burbank, in memory of Mr. Robert W. Burbank; and the Window of Faith, on the south side of the West Transept, the gift of Mrs. Eliza N. Viall, in memory of Mr. Richmond Viall.

An additional backlit stained-glass pendant was added at the corner of the side aisle and the East Transept in 1950. It was given by former organist, Helen Hogan Coome, who with church support, ministered to Londoners suffering after The Blitz. The pendant is a depiction of Central Church, designed by English stained-glass artist, Leonard Walker. Coome commissioned the work after seeing a similar pendant by Walker, depicting St Paul's Cathedral, in Stanley Marchant's office at the Royal Academy of Music. Walker worked on the pendant during the war when many artists were out of work and churches were being destroyed by the bombing. It is described in the 1952 Anniversary Calendar:

Above are the towers of Central Church with its copper dome. Below is the communion table around which the church family gathers. The star is the Star of Bethlehem offering hope and guidance of Christmas. Holly is used in the outer edge near it. The cross is the very life of the Christian faith and symbolic of Easter with its garland of Easter lilies. The lighted candles are symbolic of our individual faith, which we keep burning brightly. On either side is the coat of arms of Yale University and the seal of Union Theological Seminary from which Dr. Bradford graduated. The whole pendant is beautified by the luminous stream of water coming from beyond the star.

==== Organ ====
The current Aeolian-Skinner organ was installed in 1965 and dedicated to the Reverend Arthur Howe Bradford. It replaced an organ built by Austin Organs in 1917, which replaced a Farrand & Votey Organ Company instrument. The installation included a new organ screen and the extension of the choir loft. It contains four divisions, 58 ranks and a total of 3,456 pipes, and was restored in 2009.

==== Chapel Hall ====
Before the construction of the present sanctuary, the church built Memorial Chapel, now known as Chapel Hall. The Chapel was given to the church by Mr. and Mrs. John W. Danielson and Miss Amelia Lockwood, in memory of Amos DeForest Lockwood and Amelia Fuller Lockwood. It was first used on Easter Sunday, April 17, 1892.

==== Education Wing ====
Between 1928 and 1932, the church added a large Church School building, and renovated and expanded other facilities, including the Memorial Chapel. The architects for these additions were Jackson, Robertson & Adams. The Education Wing contains a large basement recreation room, known as the Makepeace Room.

==== Wilson Chapel ====
In 1964, the side-facing pews in the West Transept were re-arranged to face forward, creating the Wilson Chapel. It is named in honor of the Rev. William Croft Wilson, a young associate minister of the church who died very suddenly.

== Senior Ministers ==
To date, there have been ten Senior Ministers of Central Congregational Church:

- Leonard Swain, D.D. 1852-1869
- George Harris Jr., D.D. 1872-1883
- Charles W. Huntington, D.D. 1884-1888
- Edward C. Moore, D.D. 1889-1902
- Edward F. Sanderson, B.D. 1903-1908
- Gaius Glenn Atkins, D.D. 1910-1917
- Arthur H. Bradford, D.D. 1918-1952
- Lawrence L. Durgin, D.D. 1952-1961
- Raymond E. Gibson, Ph.D. 1961-1988
- Rebecca L. Spencer, M.Div. 1988-2023
- Patrick Faulhaber, M.Div. 2024-

== Gallery ==
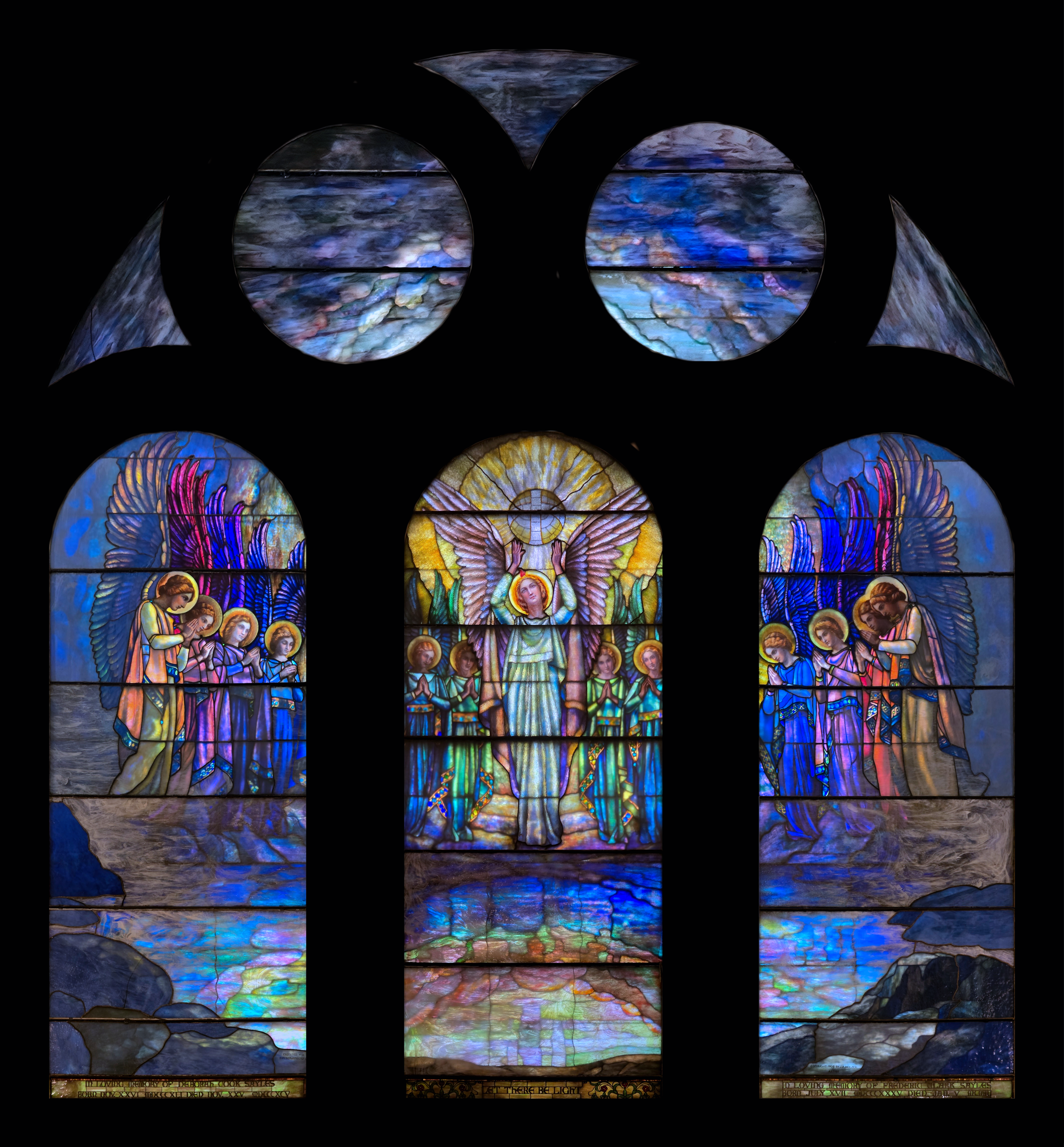
Window of Light

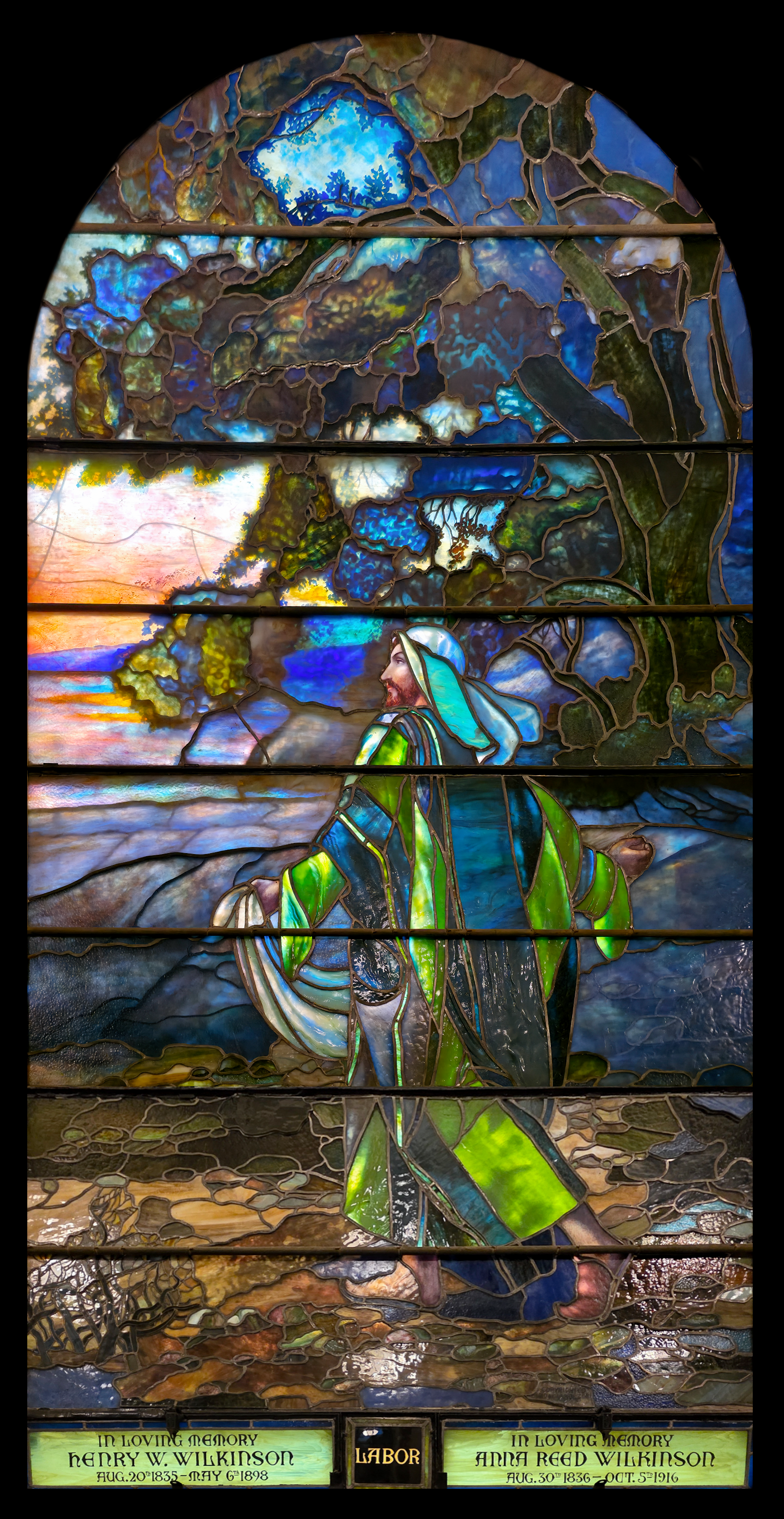
Window of Labor

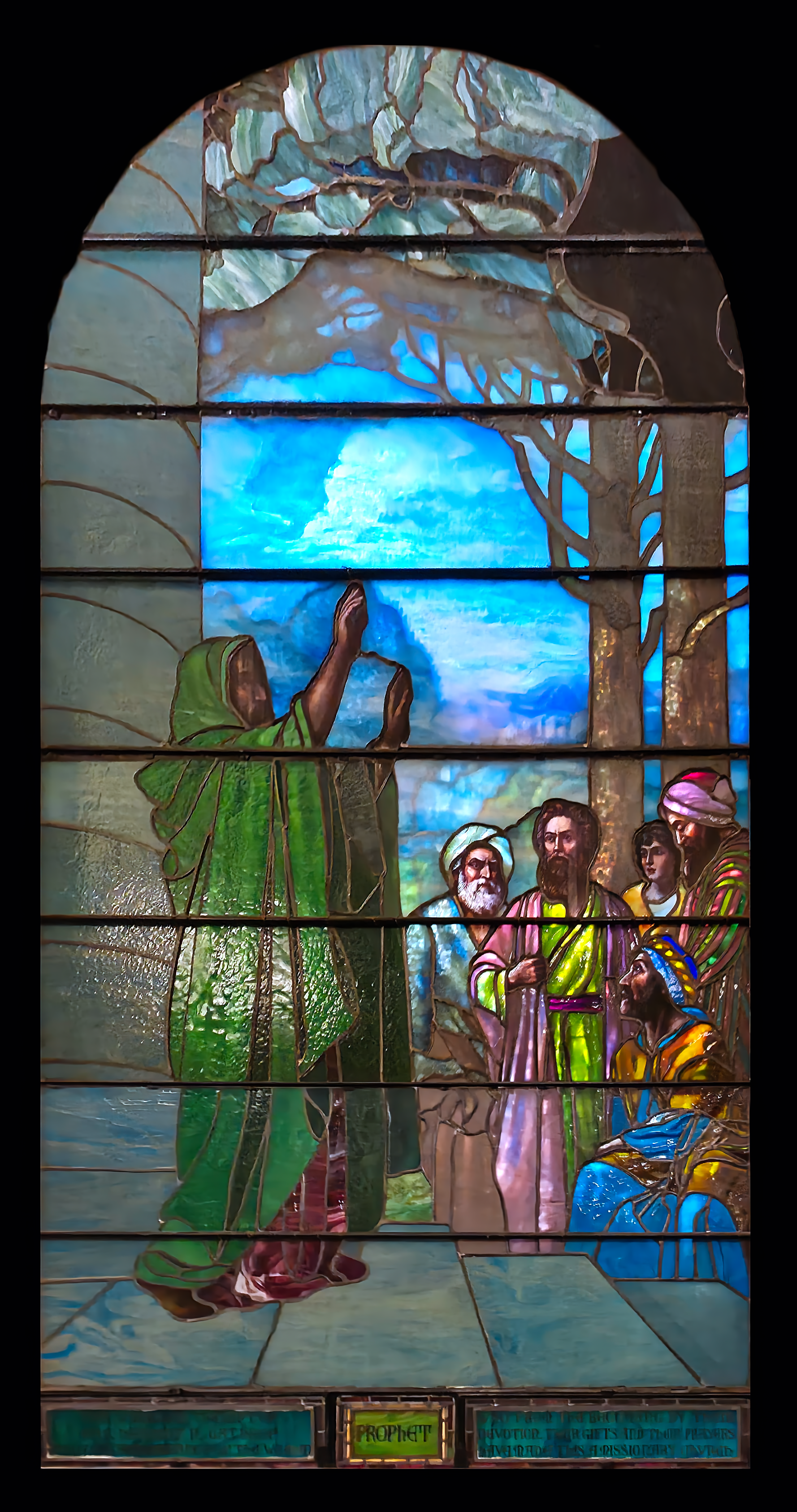
Window of Prophesy

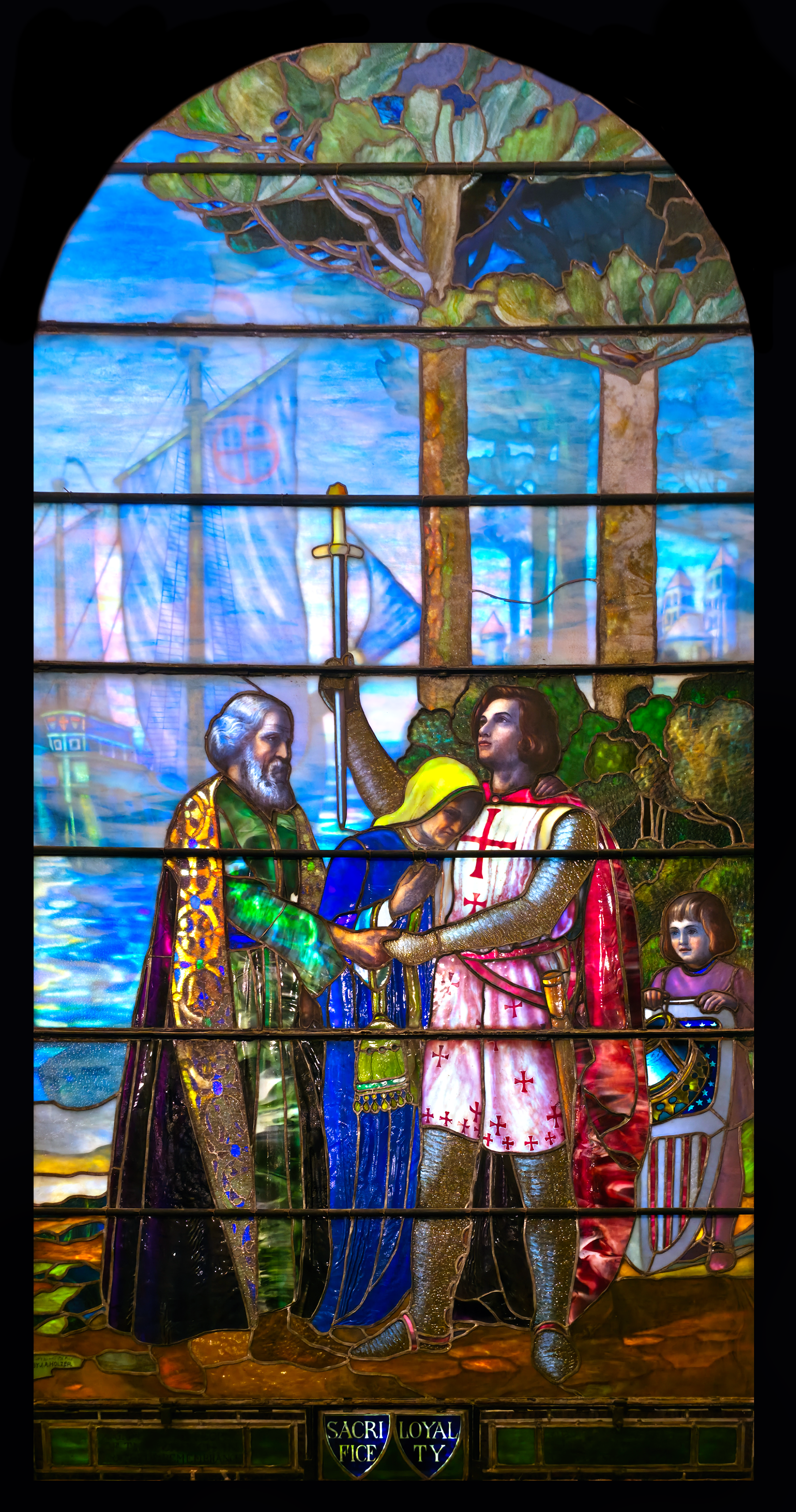
Window of Sacrifice

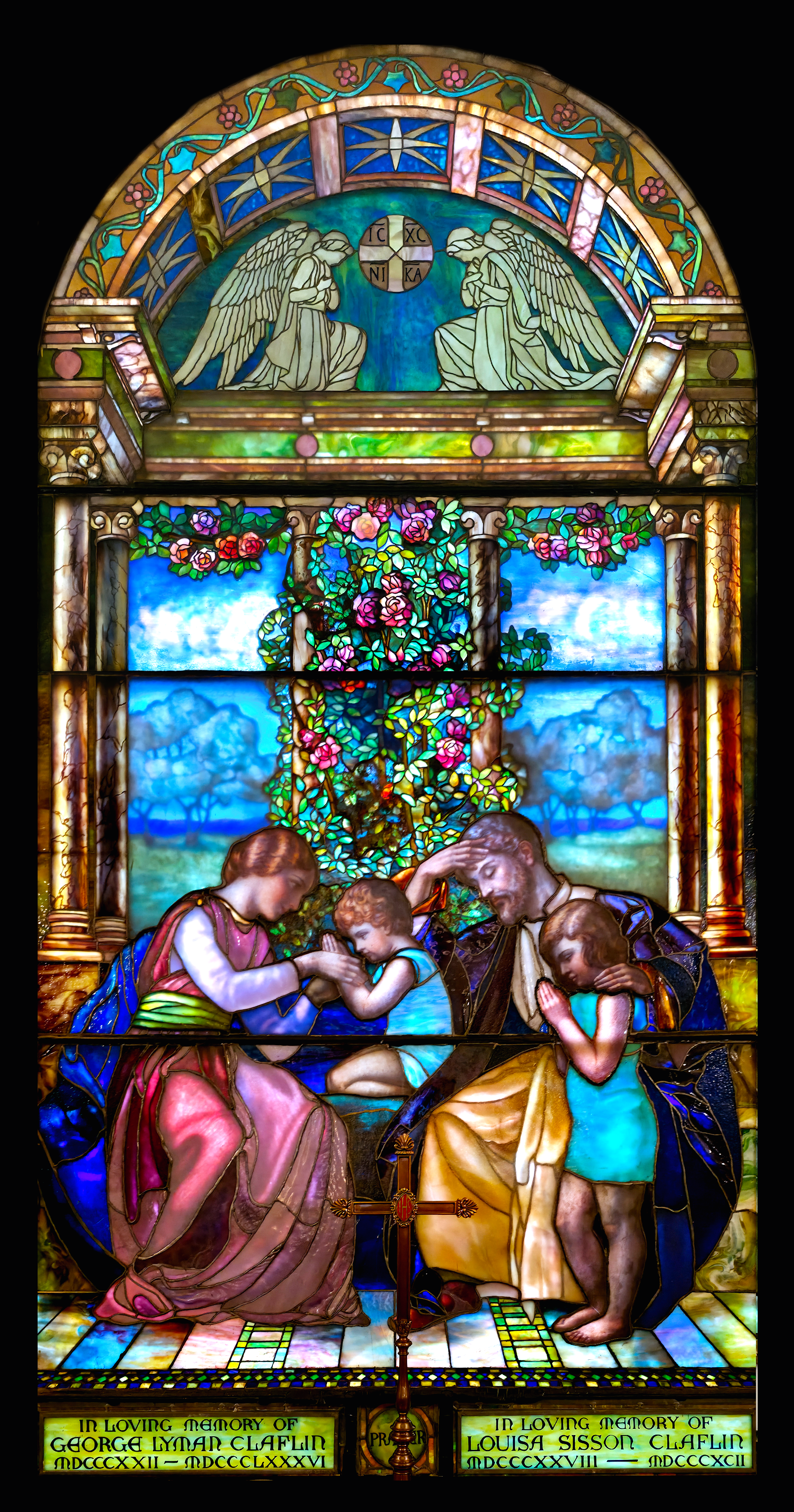
Window of Prayer

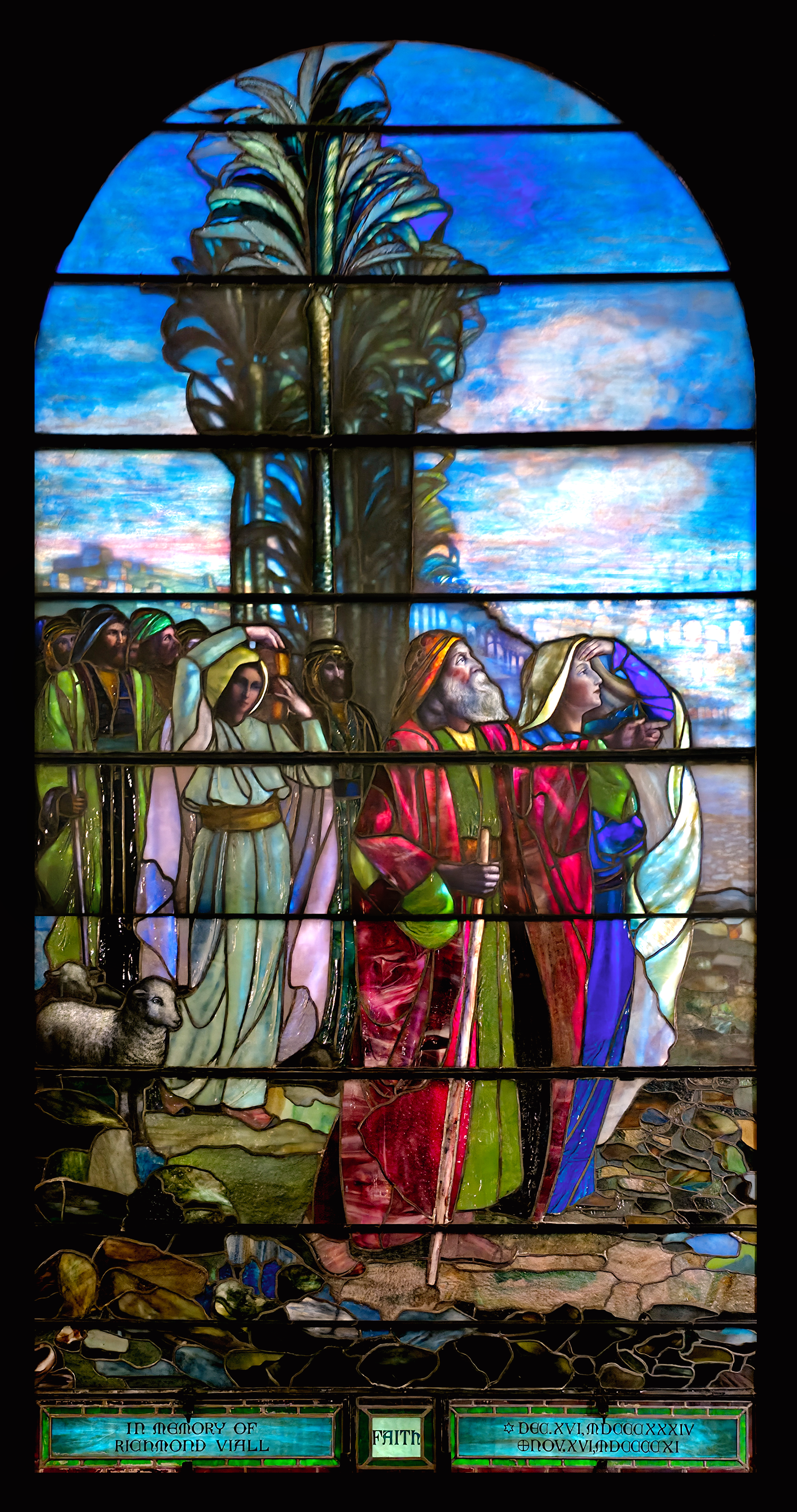
Window of Fiath

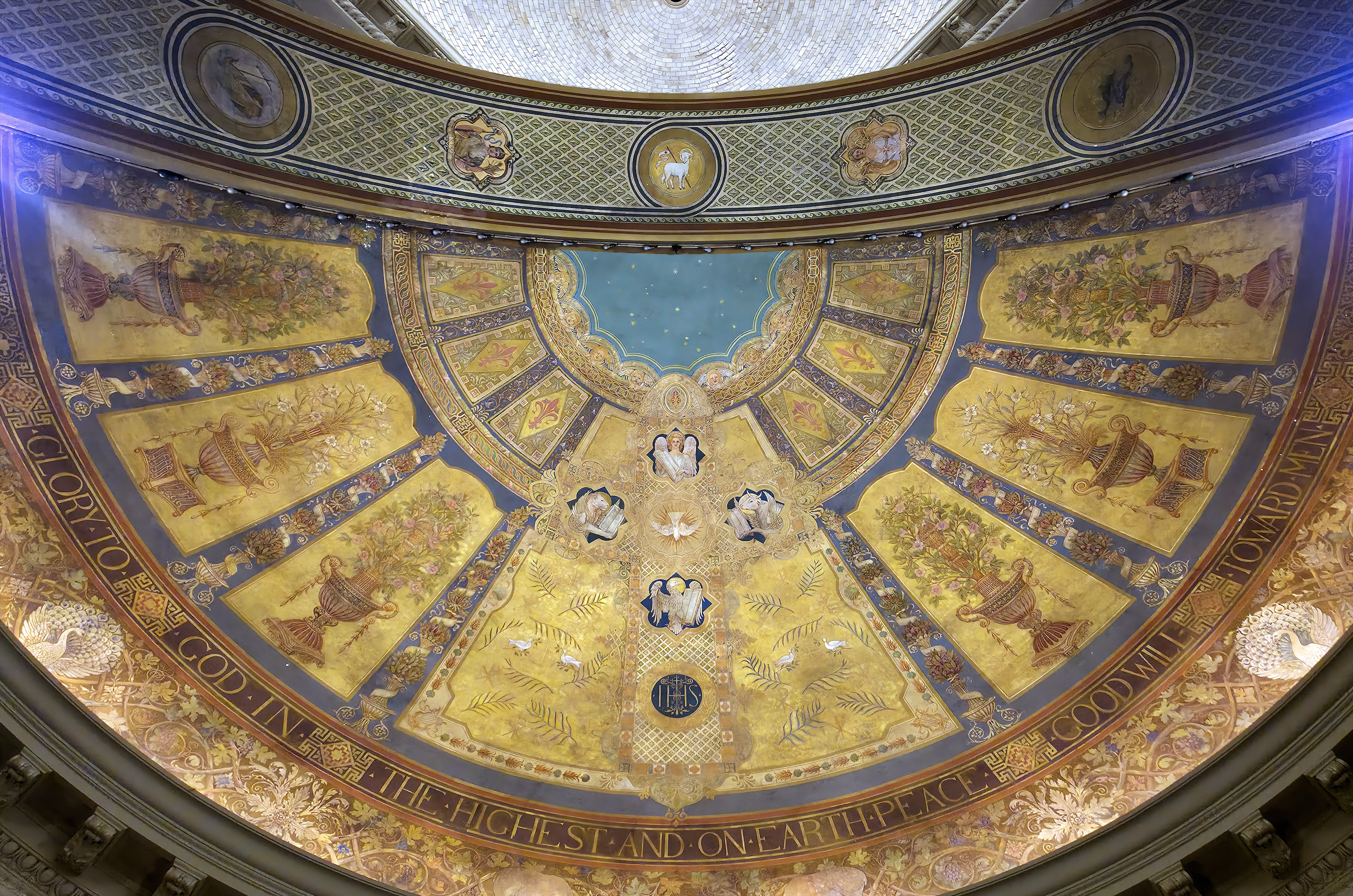
Chancel Mural

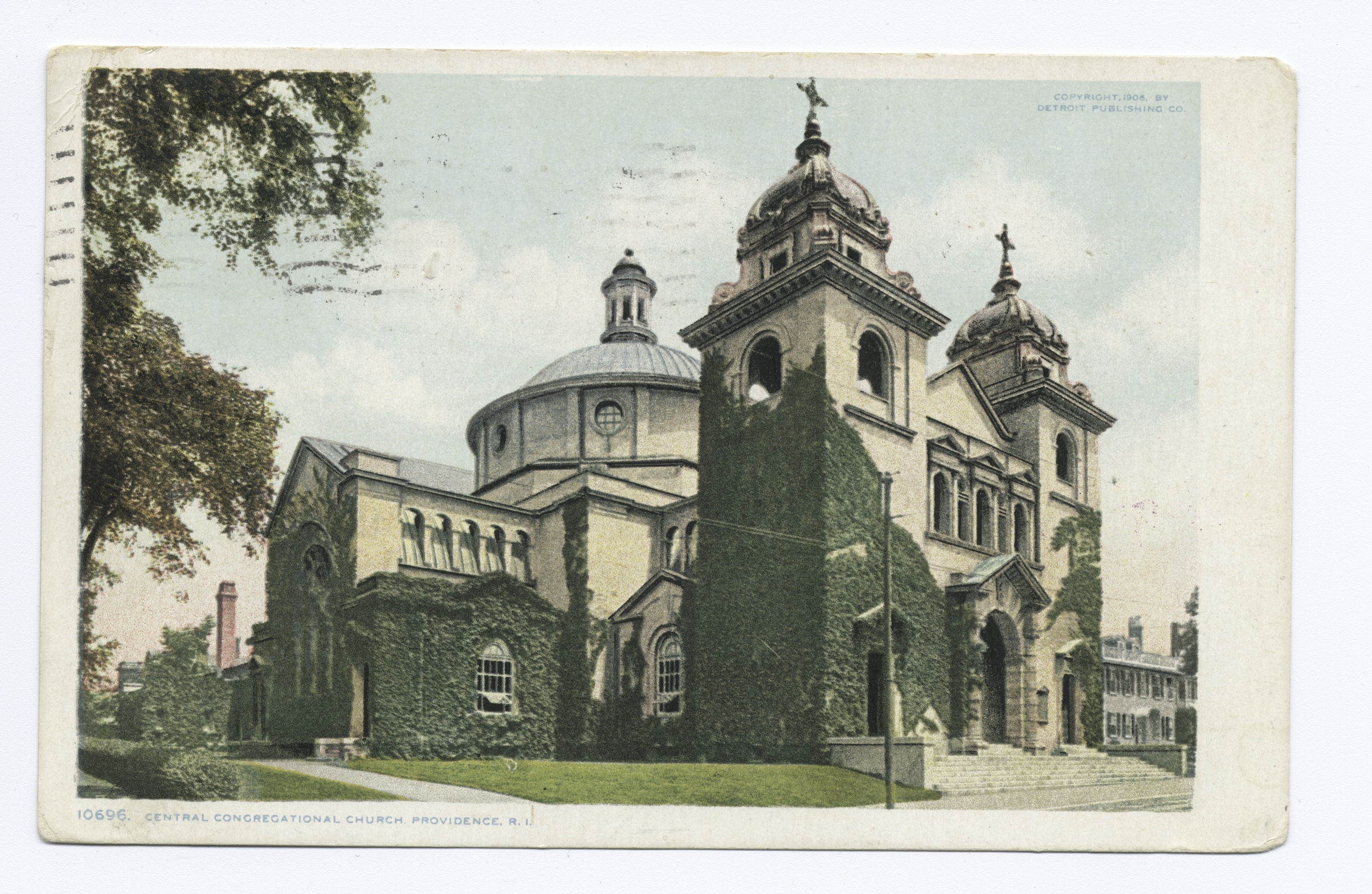
Postcard ca. 1900

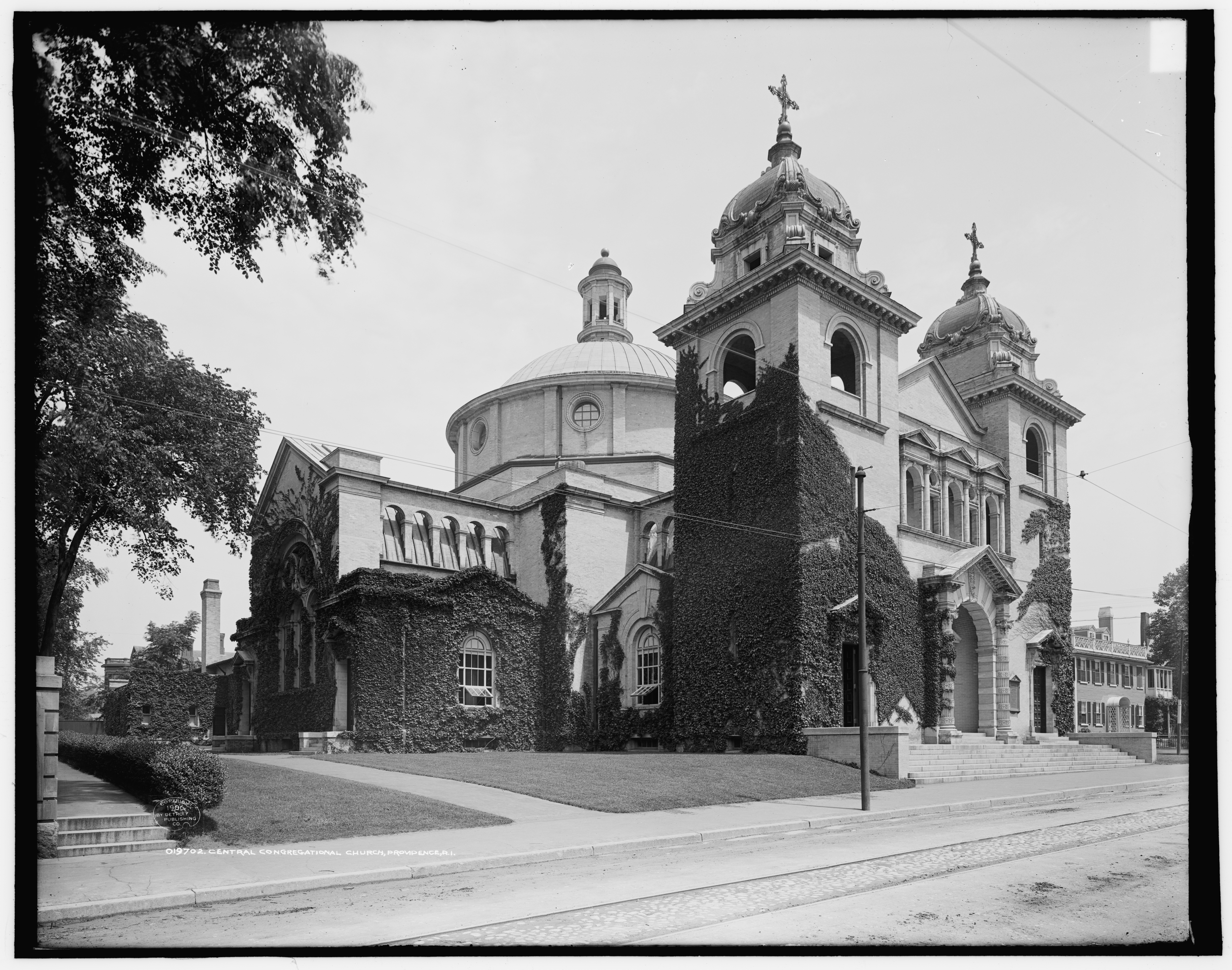

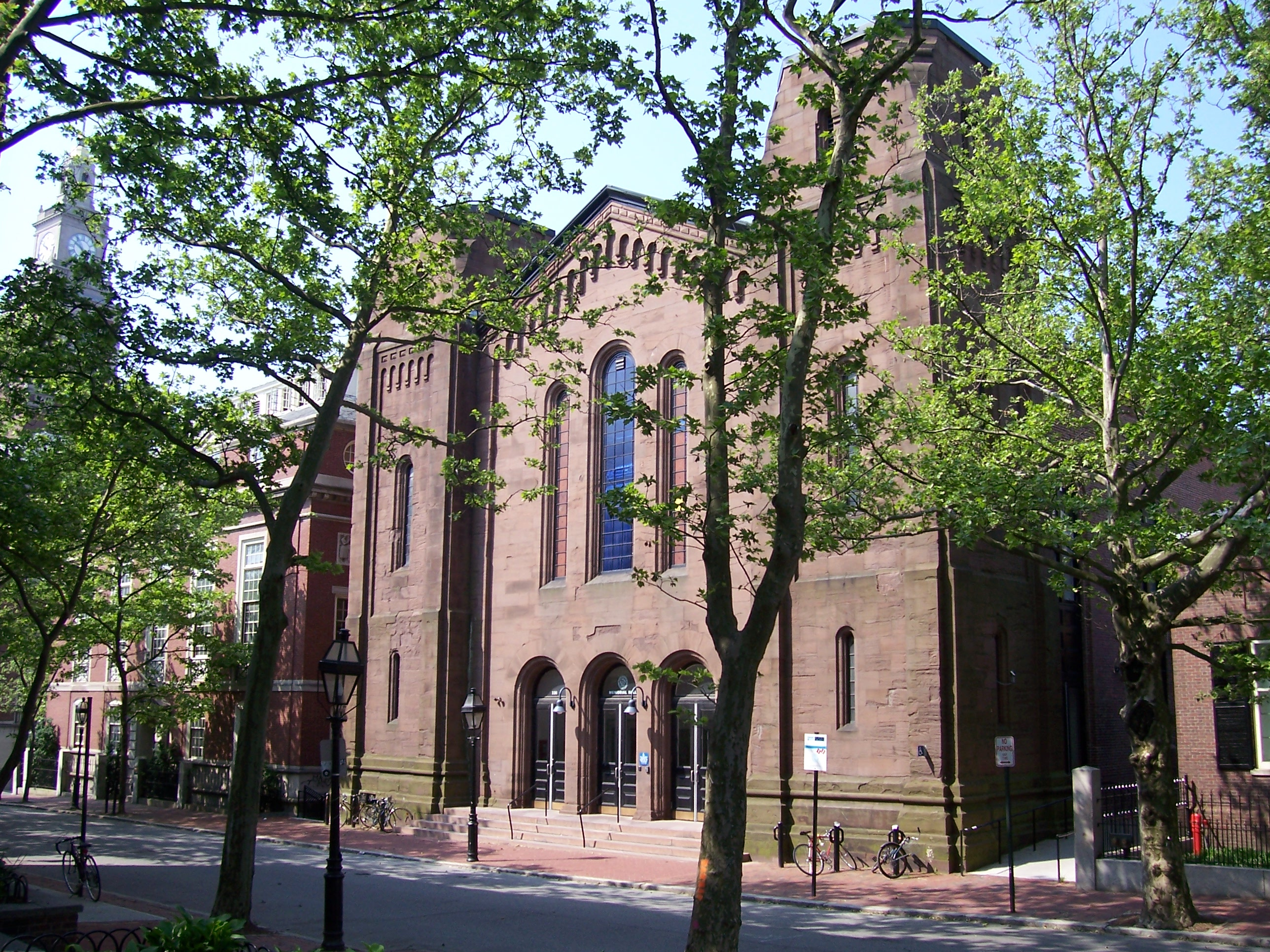
Original church building on Benefit St., now RISD Memorial Hall

== See also ==
- Hamilton House, a non-profit next door at 276 Angell Street, also designed by Carrere and Hastings
