= Walker Pond (Massachusetts) =

Lake in Massachusetts, United States

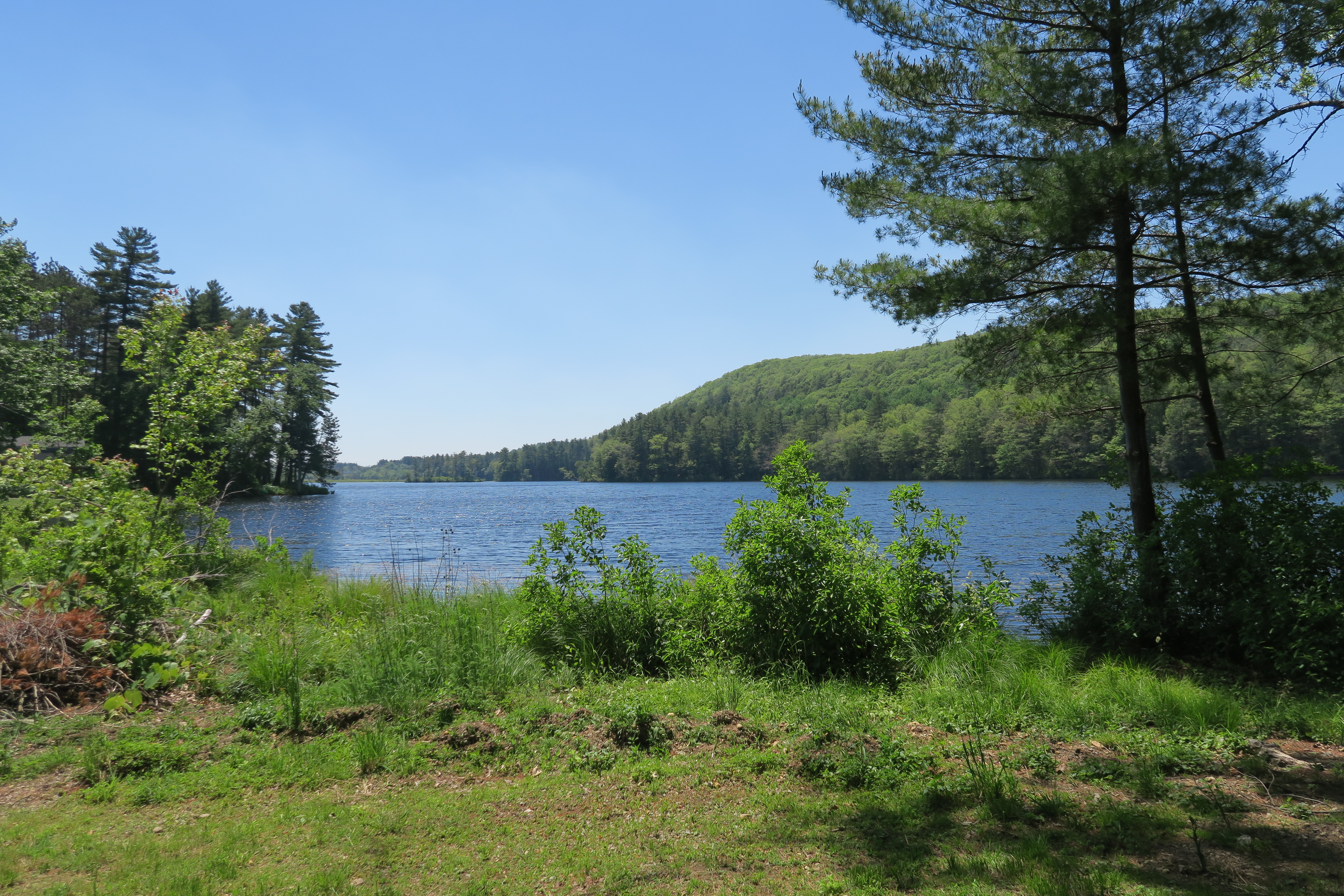
- Walker Pond

- Location within Massachusetts Location within the United States
- Location: Sturbridge, Massachusetts
- Coordinates: 42°08′20″N 72°03′35″W
- Basin countries: United States
- Surface area: 104 acres (42 ha)
- Average depth: 7.5 ft (2.3 m)
- Max. depth: 16 ft (4.9 m)
- Surface elevation: 581 ft (177 m)

Walker Pond is a body of water in Sturbridge, Massachusetts, situated off Route 49 on the way to Wells State Park.

== History ==
The pond took its name from settler Rachael "Walker" Smith, a local resident who raised twelve Italian children there. (The house, since demolished, was called the Perez Walker House in memory of Nathaniel Walker's grandson, a prominent townsman.) In 1894, the town of Sturbridge voted to rename the pond Tantousque Lake, from an Indian word meaning "located between two breast-shaped hills." The traditional Indian name did not, however, stick.

== Fishing ==
According to a 1980 survey, the pond contains largemouth bass, chain pickerel, yellow perch, white perch, bluegill, pumpkinseed, brown bullhead, white suckers, and golden and bridled shiners. It is a popular place for ice fishing.
