= Francis W. Carpenter =

American businessman (1831–1922)

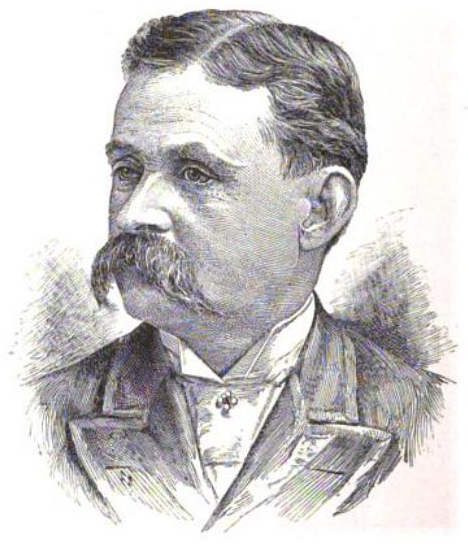
- Born: Francis Wood Carpenter; June 24, 1831; Seekonk, Massachusetts
- Died: December 1, 1922; Providence, Rhode Island
- Resting place: Newman Cemetery
- Occupation: Businessman
- Known for: Congdon & Carpenter
- Spouses: Anna Davis Barney (m. 1853; died 1864) Harriet Zerviah Pope (m. 1867)
- Children: 10

Signature
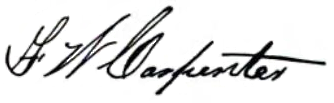

Francis Wood Carpenter (June 24, 1831 – December 1, 1922) was a prominent businessman and steel merchant in Providence, Rhode Island.

== Early life and education ==
He was born in Seekonk, Massachusetts to Edmund Carpenter, a blacksmith, and Lemira Tiffany Carpenter. He was a direct descendant of William Carpenter, who came to Rhode Island in 1638. He attended Seekonk Academy and prepared for college, but instead became an apprentice under Gilbert Congdon.

== Career ==
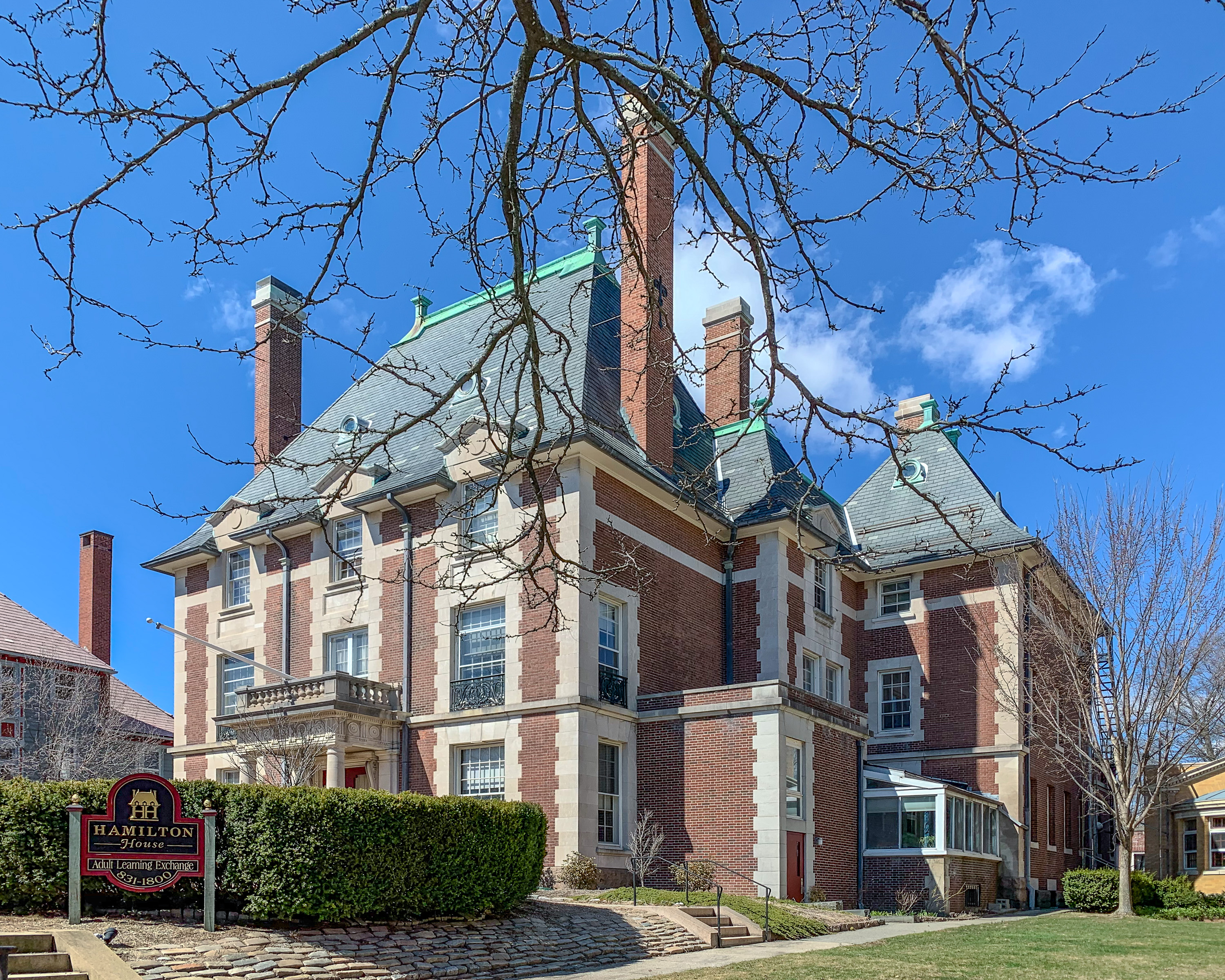
The 1896 Francis W. Carpenter House, now known as Hamilton House

From 1892 until his death, he was the president of Congdon & Carpenter Company, an iron and steel company which was founded in 1792, and operated in Providence into the 1980s. He was also the president of the Rhode Island Perkins Horse Shoe Company, the Quidnick Manufacturing Company, the Boston District Messenger Company, the Postal District Messenger Company of Providence, and the American National Bank. He was a director of the Peoples Savings Bank in Providence, the Corliss Safe and Vault Door Company, the Providence Washington Insurance Company, and the Union Mutual Insurance Company. He was a President of the Providence Commercial Club and of the Providence YMCA.

Carpenter was very influential as chairman of the committee on the construction of a new building for the Central Congregational Church in 1893. He hired the same architects, Carrère and Hastings of New York to design his own house next to the church, which is now Hamilton House. In 1927, Carpenter was referred to as "the most generous donor Central Church has ever known." Among other items, he donated the West Window and the chancel dome decoration at the church.

He contributed generously to numerous charities in Providence and abroad. He was a member of the Squantum Association, the Hope Club and the Oquossoc Angling Association in Indian Rock, Maine.

== Family life ==
He married Anna Davis Barney in 1853, and had six children before her death in 1864. He married Harriet Zerviah Pope in 1867 and had four children.

He died at his home at 276 Angell Street. He is buried with his parents and both of his wives in the Newman Cemetery in East Providence, Rhode Island.
