= Hope Street, Providence =

Street in Providence, Rhode Island

Coordinates: 41°50′52.96″N 71°23′43.83″W

Hope Street is a major two lane bidirectional street running about three miles north to south on the East Side of Providence, Rhode Island. The street serves as a main artery serving most of the East Side district and connects the East Side to Pawtucket at the north, where it continues as East Avenue.

It intersects with other important streets on the East Side including Blackstone Boulevard, Waterman Street, Angell Street, Thayer Street, and Wickenden Street. Unlike many major city arteries, Hope Street is predominantly residential, and most of the local stores and offices are located on other streets that branch off. Small areas, like the Hope Street Village, house local business and restaurants. Hope Street also runs through the eastern side of Brown University's campus. Hope High School (Rhode Island) is located on the street.

Almost all of Hope Street is serviced by RIPTA's route 1 (formerly 42), which provides transit services between Pawtucket and Downtown Providence.
