= Revere Bell (Singapore) =

Revere Bell in Singapore

- The bell in 2026, on display at the National Museum of Singapore
- Type: Revere bell
- Material: Bronze
- Height: 81 cm (32 in)
- Present location: National Museum of Singapore

The Revere Bell is a historic bell in the collection of the National Museum of Singapore. It was cast by the Revere Copper Company in Massachusetts, as part of a series of Revere bells manufactured by the company. The bell was given to St. Andrew's Church in 1843 by Mrs. Maria Revere Balestier, the daughter of Paul Revere and wife of the first American Consul to Singapore, Joseph Balestier. It is the only Revere bell outside the United States, and represents the long relationship between Singapore and the United States. The bell is 81 centimetres (32 in) in height and 89 centimetres (35 in) in diameter with a clapper underneath.

== History ==
The bell was given to St. Andrew's Church in 1843 by Maria Revere Balestier, the daughter of Paul Revere and wife of the first American Consul to Singapore, Joseph Balestier, on the condition that the bell would be used to sound a curfew for five minutes at 8:00 pm every night. Back then, it was unsafe during night, with warnings sounded to remind sailers to return to their ships and for residents to be vigilant. The curfew bell rang until 1855 when the church was demolished, and was resumed when the second church (which became St. Andrew's Cathedral later) was constructed in its place in 1861 until it was permanently discontinued in 1874.

The bell remained in the church until 6 February 1889, where it was replaced by a new peal of bells presented from the family of Captain J. S. H. Fraser and subsequently put into a Public Works Department storage in Kandang Kerbau. In 1911, it was installed in St. George's Garrison Church in Tanglin Barracks. However, after it became irreparably cracked it was moved to a Royal Engineers storeyard. The Raffles Museum, now the National Museum of Singapore, learned of the bell in September 1937, and took custody of it after the Anglican Archdeacon of Singapore, Graham White, donated it to the museum.

Since then the Revere Bell has been displayed the National Museum, apart from a period between January 1997 and May 2006 when the bell was loaned to the United States Embassy in Singapore while the museum was being renovated. During that time it was showcased behind velvet ropes in the foyer of the Embassy. The bell, now in the museum's Singapore History Gallery, has been called a symbol of the friendship between the peoples of Singapore and the United States.

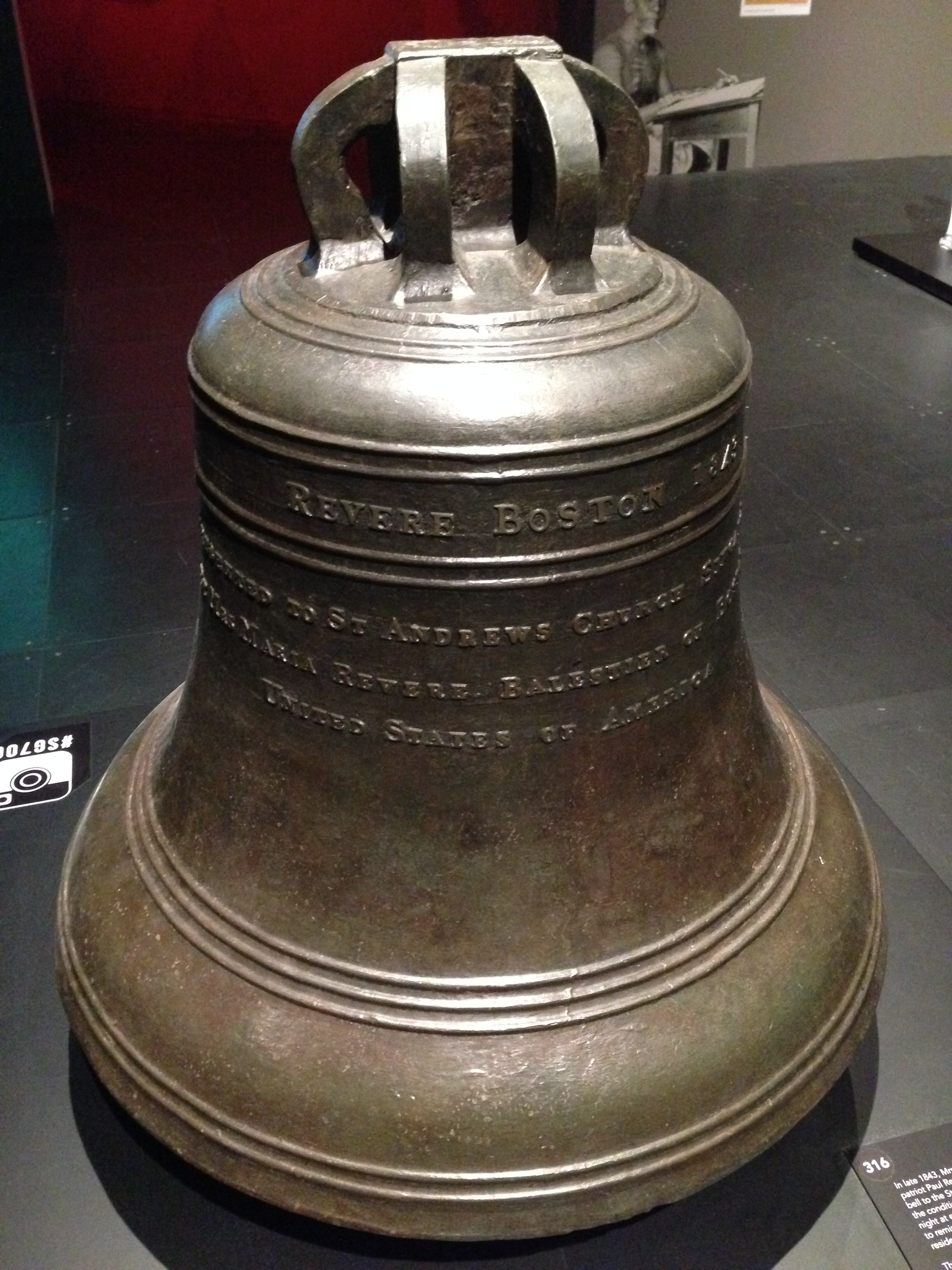
The Revere Bell on display at the National Museum of Singapore in February 2015. The inscription of the bell is: "Revere, Boston 1843. Presented to St Andrew's Church, Singapore, by Mrs Maria Revere Balestier of Boston, United States of America".

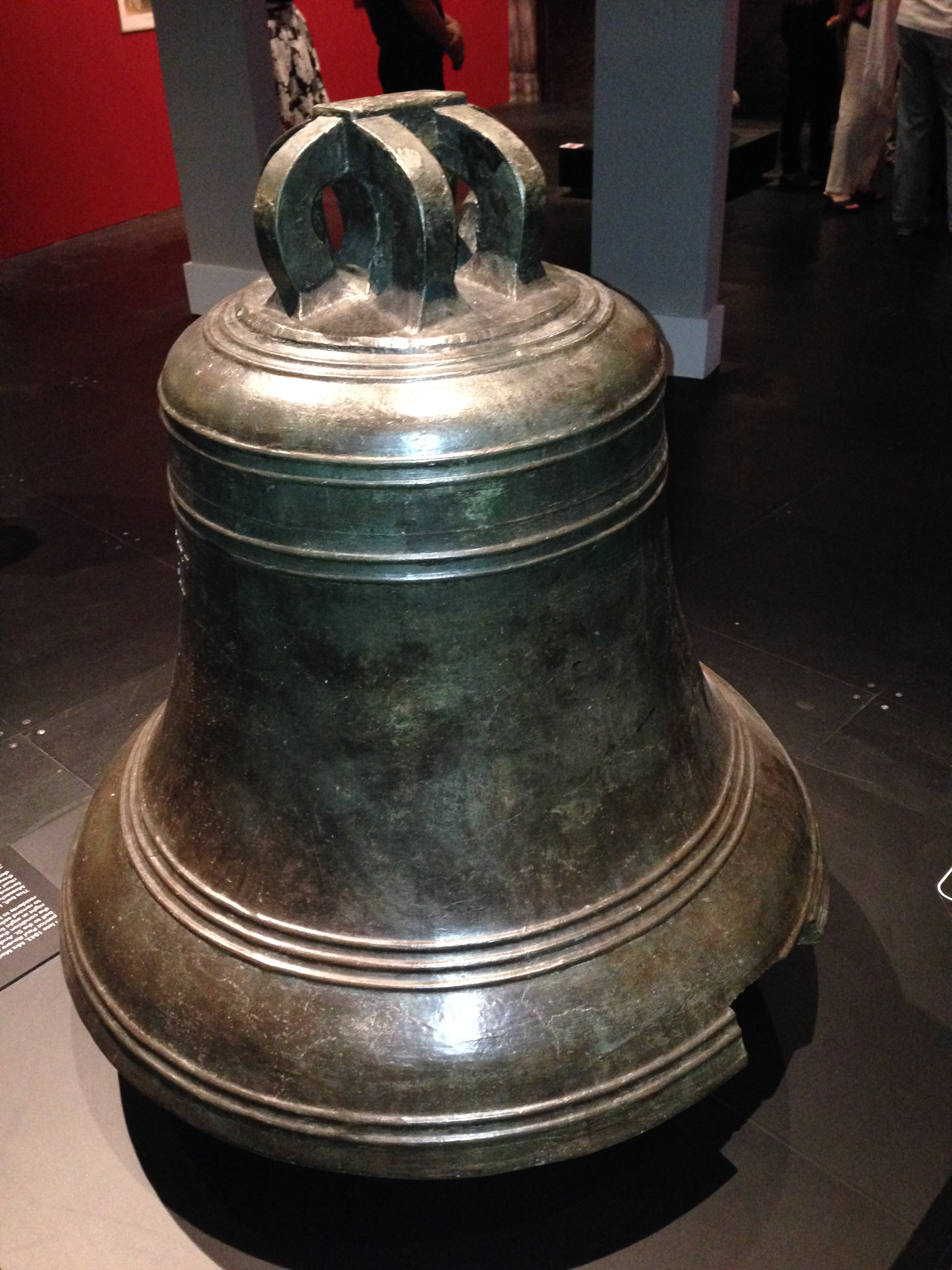
Due to irreparable cracking of the bell (bottom right of the photograph), it was placed in storage until 1937 when it was donated to the Raffles Museum, now the National Museum of Singapore

== See also ==
- Balestier Road
- Revere bells
