= Trinity Church (Pawtucket, Rhode Island) =

Historic church in Rhode Island, United States

- U.S. National Register of Historic Places
- U.S. Historic district – Contributing property
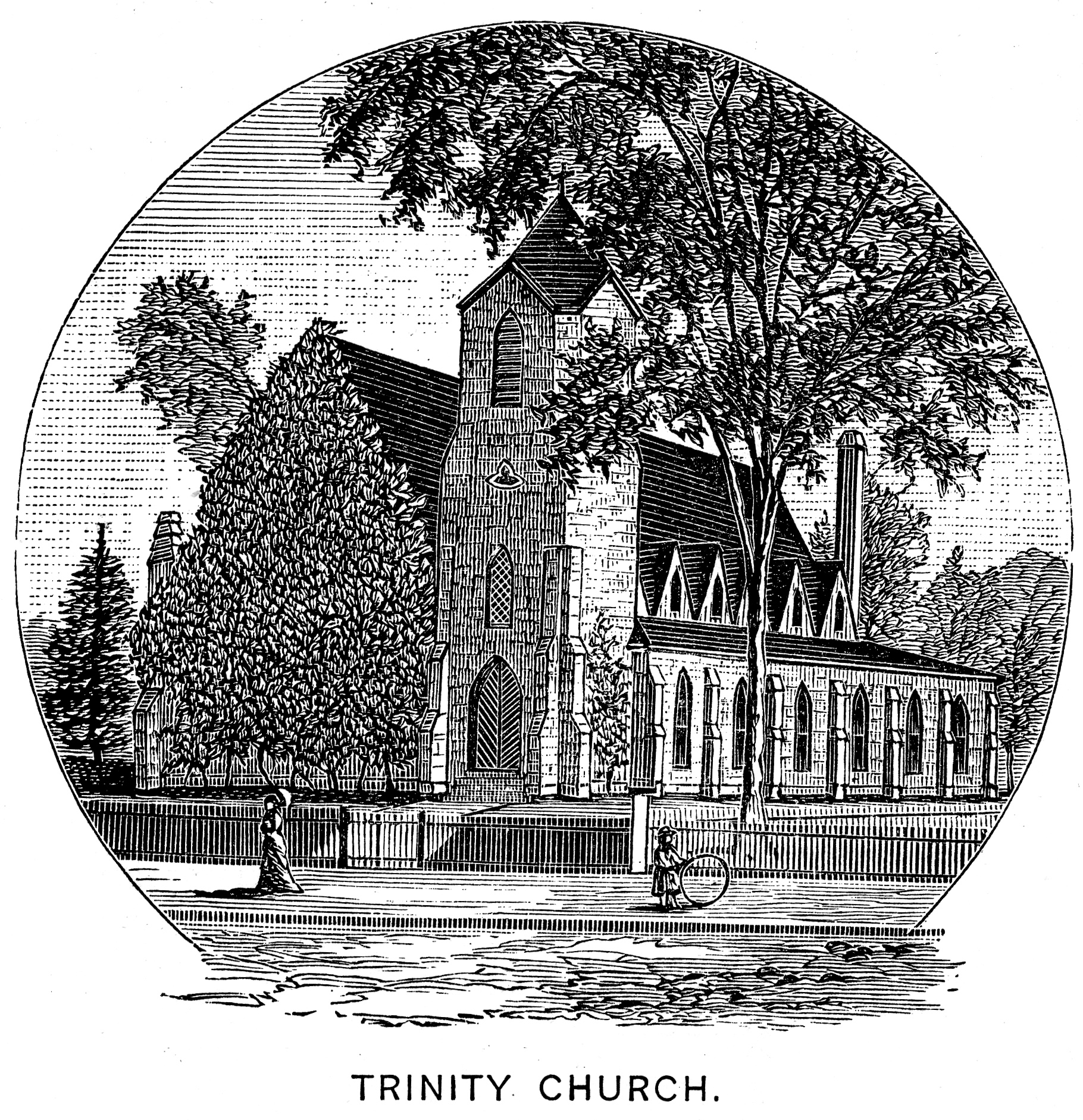
- 1886 engraving

- Location within Rhode Island Location within the United States
- Location: 48 Main Street, Pawtucket, Rhode Island
- Coordinates: 41°52′26″N 71°22′51″W
- Built: 1852-53
- Architect: Samuel J. Ladd; Clifton A. Hall; Cattanach & Cliff; Stone, Carpenter & Willson; Frances E. Henley
- Architectural style: Gothic Revival
- Part of: Quality Hill Historic District (ID84002041)
- NRHP reference No.: 72000003

Significant dates
- Added to NRHP: January 13, 1972
- Designated CP: April 13, 1984

Trinity Episcopal Church was a historic church located at 48 Main Street in Pawtucket, Rhode Island, United States. Built by the Episcopalians, the building was sold to the Catholics in 1977 and became the St. George Maronite Catholic Church within the Maronite Catholic Eparchy of Saint Maron of Brooklyn. The church burned down in 2005, and was not rebuilt.

== Architecture ==
The Gothic Revival structure was constructed of random fieldstone ashlars, capped with sandstone; the roof was slate over an open timber arched frame. A separate chancel was placed on the south end of the building, and a shed-roofed ambulatory was run along the west side to house a side chapel and its altar. An odd detail was a set of dormers in the main west side roof, each with a lancet window; other windows also generally were of the lancet form, including a triple set at either end of the building. A belltower was attached to the northwest corner of the building; its third story, which contained the bell chamber, was topped with a Rhenish helm roof and was made octagonal through the truncation of the four corners.

== History ==
The Trinity Episcopal Church was established in 1845. The architect of the church was Samuel J. Ladd, a founding member of the congregation. He drafted the plan between 1850 and 1851. In 1865, architect Clifton A. Hall was hired to design an addition, which consisted of the low ambulatory on the west side of the building. At the same time, the Providence firm of Cattanach & Cliff was hired to redecorate the interior. In 1901, a parish house was built. It was designed by noted practitioners Stone, Carpenter & Willson. This small building extended from the rear of the church to School Street. Frances E. Henley executed some alterations in 1937.

Trinity also owned a house it used as a rectory. It was located at 50 Main Street, at the corner of School. It had been built in 1815 as the residence of Eliphalet Slack. It was a 3-story house in the Federal style.

The house was destroyed many years before the church itself. The church complex was added to the National Register of Historic Places in 1972. It was destroyed by fire in 2005 and not rebuilt.

== Gallery ==
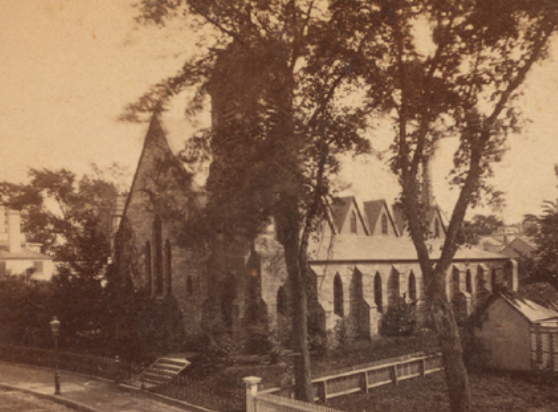
The church during the 1870s.

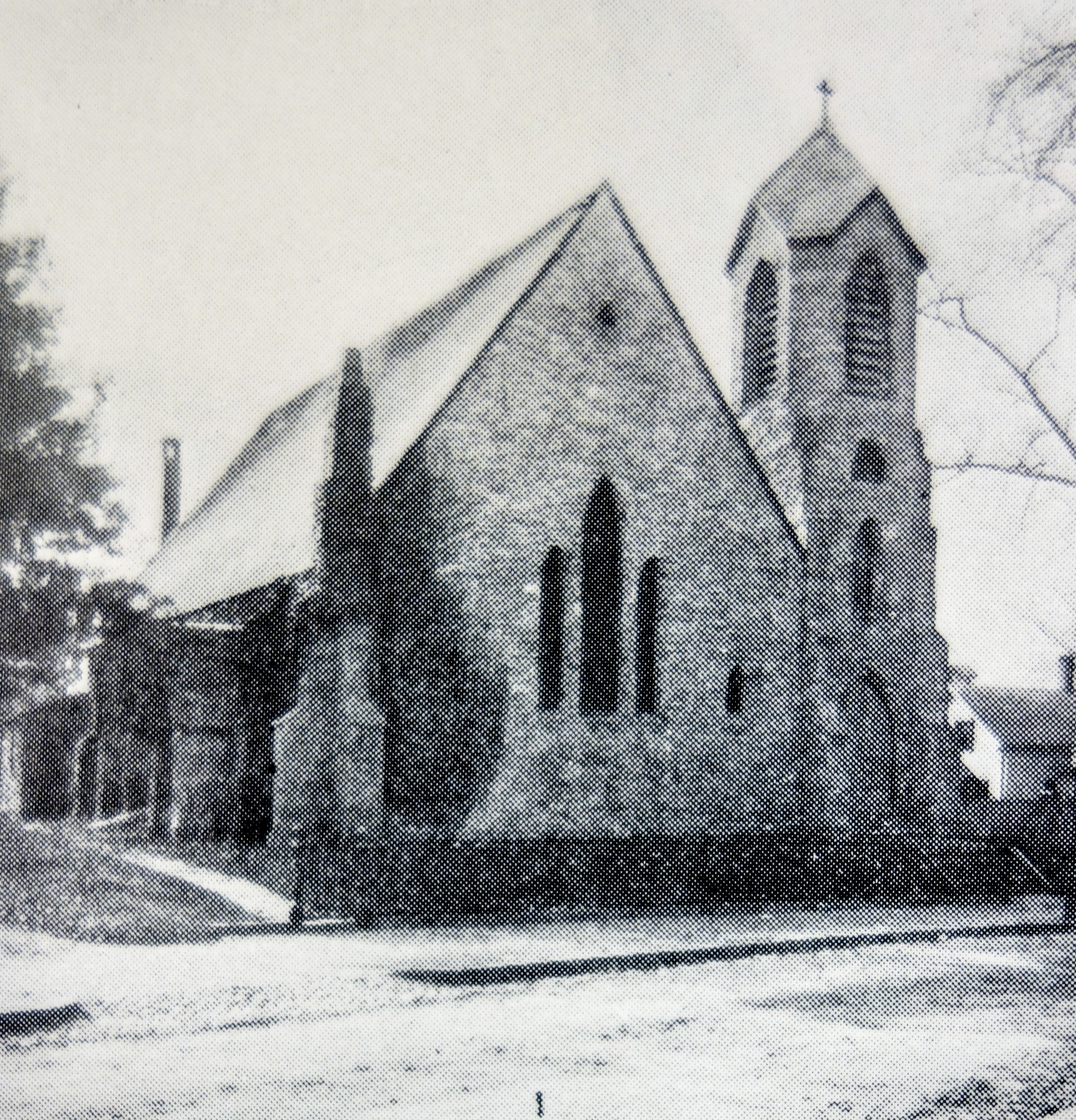
1897 image of Trinity Church

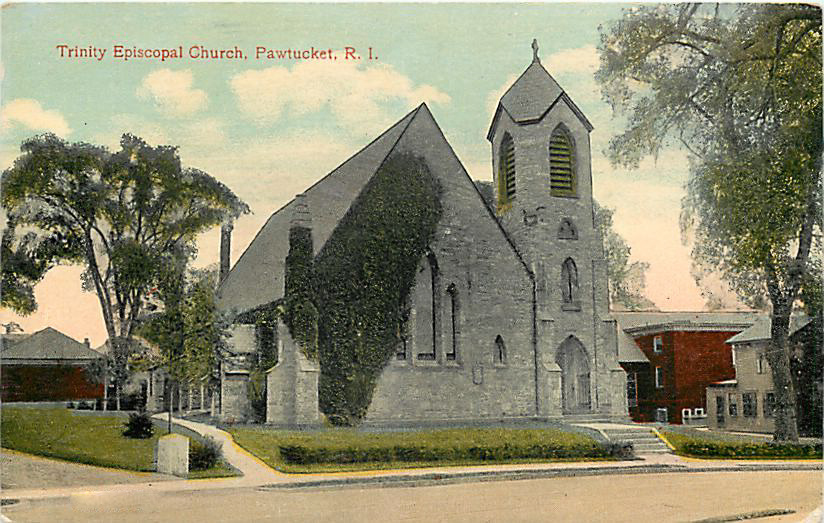
1910 postcard

== See also ==
- National Register of Historic Places listings in Pawtucket, Rhode Island
