= D. Howard Thornton =

American architect (Daniel Howard Thornton; 1870–1911)

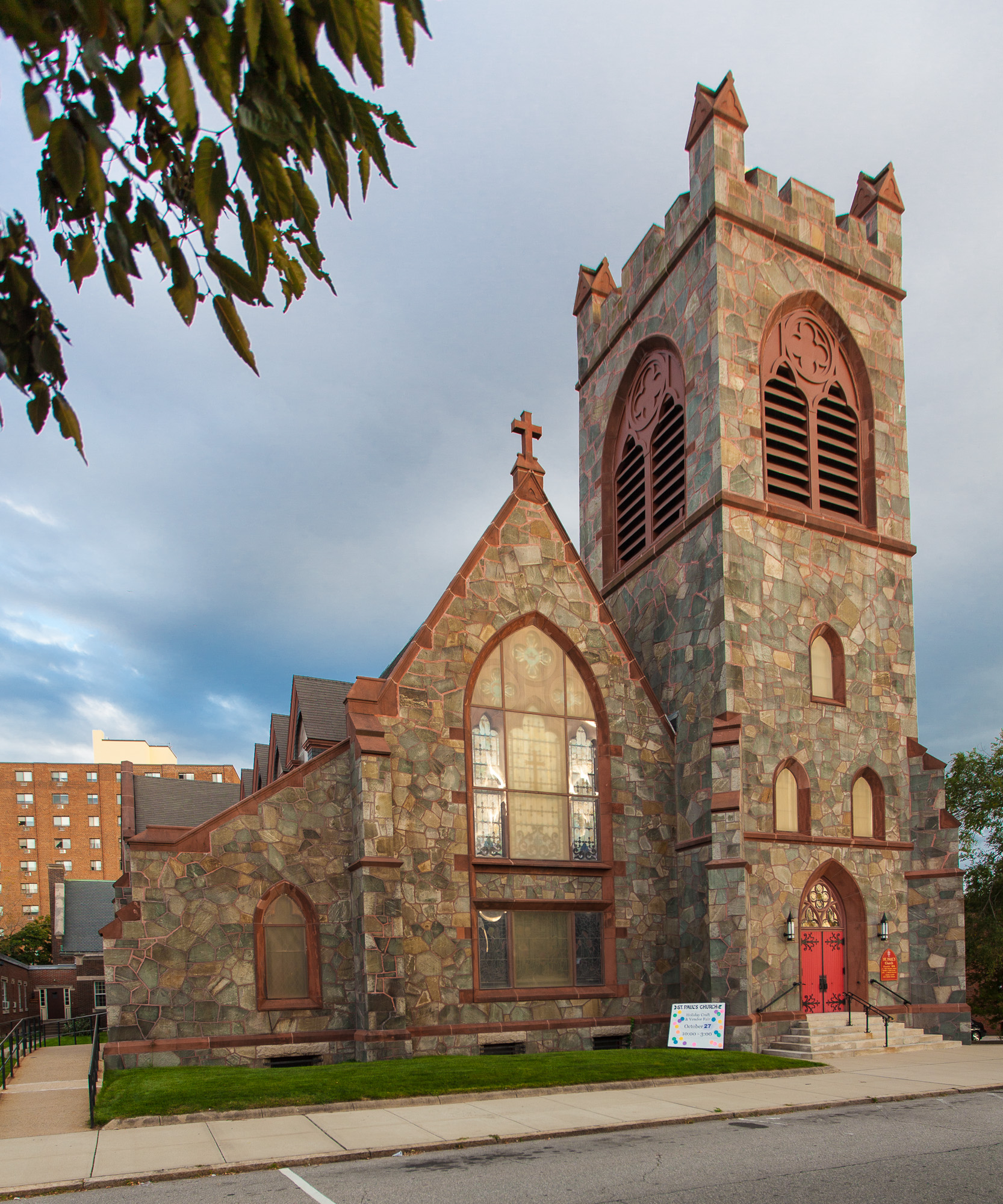
St. Paul's Episcopal Church, Pawtucket, Rhode Island, 1901.

Daniel Howard Thornton (1870–1911) was an American architect from Providence, Rhode Island.

Thornton established himself as an architect in Olneyville (then part of Johnston) in the 1890s. He remained there until about 1900, when he formed a partnership with Richard C. Sanders, another young architect, in central Providence. Sanders & Thornton was dissolved in 1902, and Thornton partnered with his cousin, Henry C. Thornton. They split about 1903, when Henry left to partner with his brother-in-law, Edwin T. Banning. However, Thornton continued as Thornton & Thornton until his death in 1911.

== Architectural works ==
Private practice, before 1899:

- 1895 - Concord Street Grammar School, Roosevelt St. & Sterling Ave., Providence, Rhode Island. Then in Johnston. Demolished.
- 1899 - St. Alban's Episcopal Church, 1964 Smith St., Centerdale, Rhode Island. Altered.

Sanders & Thornton, 1900-1902:

- 1900 - Webster Avenue Primary School, 241 Webster Ave., Providence, Rhode Island.
- 1901 - St. Paul's Episcopal Church, 50 Park Pl., Pawtucket, Rhode Island.
- 1902 - Emma A. Butts House, 329 Olney St., Providence, Rhode Island.
- 1902 - Douglas Avenue Fire Station, 137 Douglas Ave., Providence, Rhode Island.

Thornton & Thornton, 1902-1911:

- 1903 - Main Building, Rhode Island State Sanitarium, Pascoag, Rhode Island. Demolished.
- 1903 - Rhode Island Building, Louisiana Purchase Exposition, St. Louis, Missouri. Demolished.
- 1904 - Chester High School, Middlesex Tpk., Chester, Connecticut. Demolished.
- 1906 - Harold A. MacKinney House, 215 Arlington Ave., Providence, Rhode Island.
- 1907 - Churchill House (Rhode Island Women's Club), 155 Angell St., Providence, Rhode Island.
- 1910 - E. T. Davis Block, 388-392 Weybosset St., Providence, Rhode Island. Demolished.
