= Saint Paul's Church (Pawtucket, Rhode Island) =

Historic church in Rhode Island, United States

- St. Paul's Church
- U.S. National Register of Historic Places
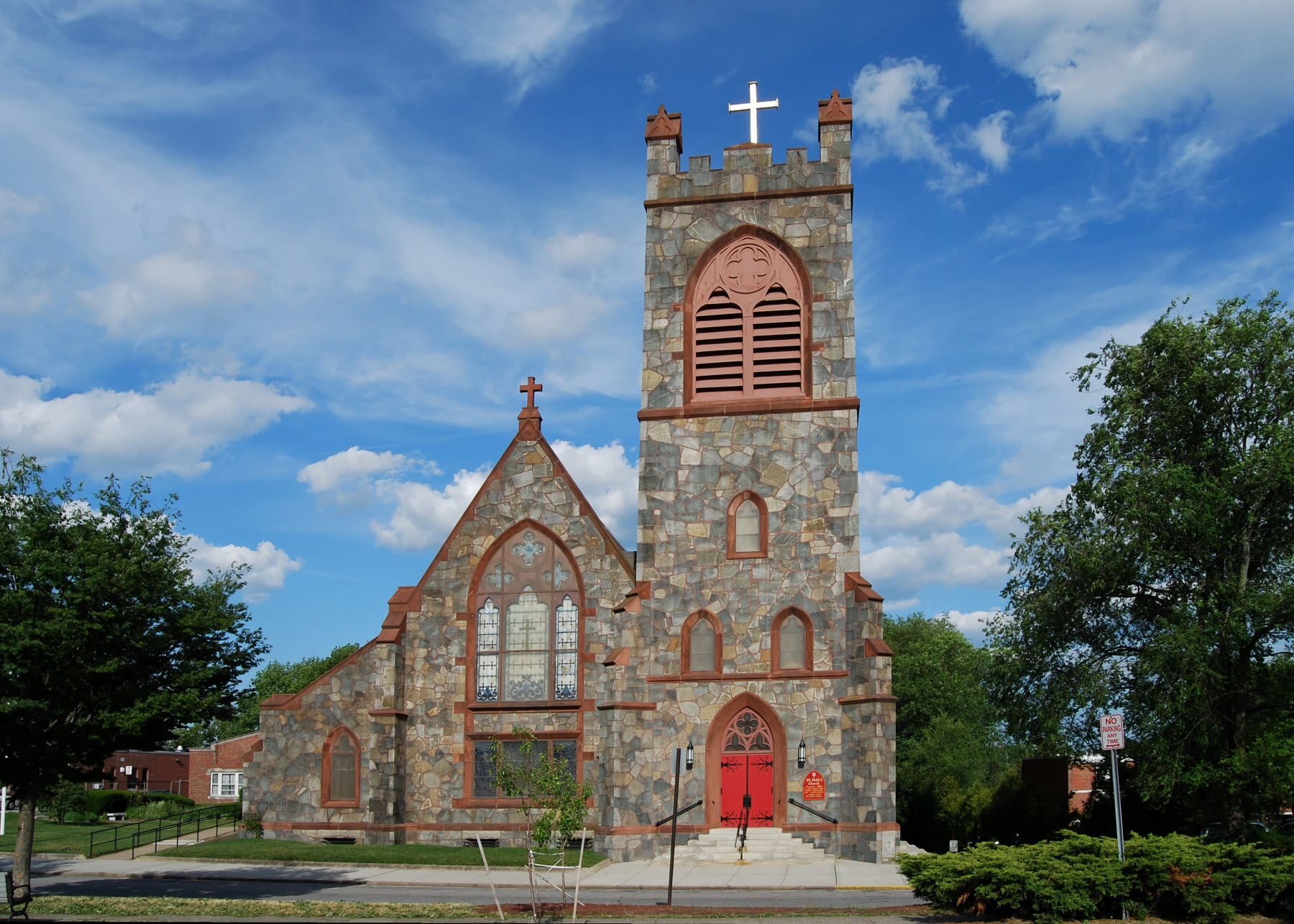

- Location within Rhode Island Location within the United States
- Location: Pawtucket, Rhode Island
- Coordinates: 41°52′32″N 71°23′14″W
- Built: 1901
- Architect: Multiple
- Architectural style: Gothic Revival
- MPS: Pawtucket MRA
- NRHP reference No.: 83003857
- Added to NRHP: November 18, 1983

St. Paul's Church is a historic Episcopal church at 50 Park Place in Pawtucket, Rhode Island. It is a stone Gothic Revival structure, designed by Sanders & Thornton of Providence and built in 1901, for a congregation established in 1816. The property also includes a Guild Hall, built in the Tudor Revival style in 1915, and a 1963 brick office wing. A Revere bell hangs in the church belfry.

The church reported 252 members in 2021 and 136 members in 2023; no membership statistics were reported nationally in 2024 parochial reports. Plate and pledge income reported for the congregation in 2024 was $0.00. Average Sunday attendance (ASA) in 2024 was zero persons.

The church was listed on the National Register of Historic Places in 1983.

== See also ==
- National Register of Historic Places listings in Pawtucket, Rhode Island
