= Franklin J. Sawtelle =

American architect (1846 - 1911)

- Born: October 9, 1846; Norridgewock, Maine
- Died: March 9, 1911 (aged 64); Providence, Rhode Island
- Occupation: Architect
- Awards: Fellow, American Institute of Architects (1889)
- Practice: Franklin J. Sawtelle; Sawtelle, Robertson & Shurrocks

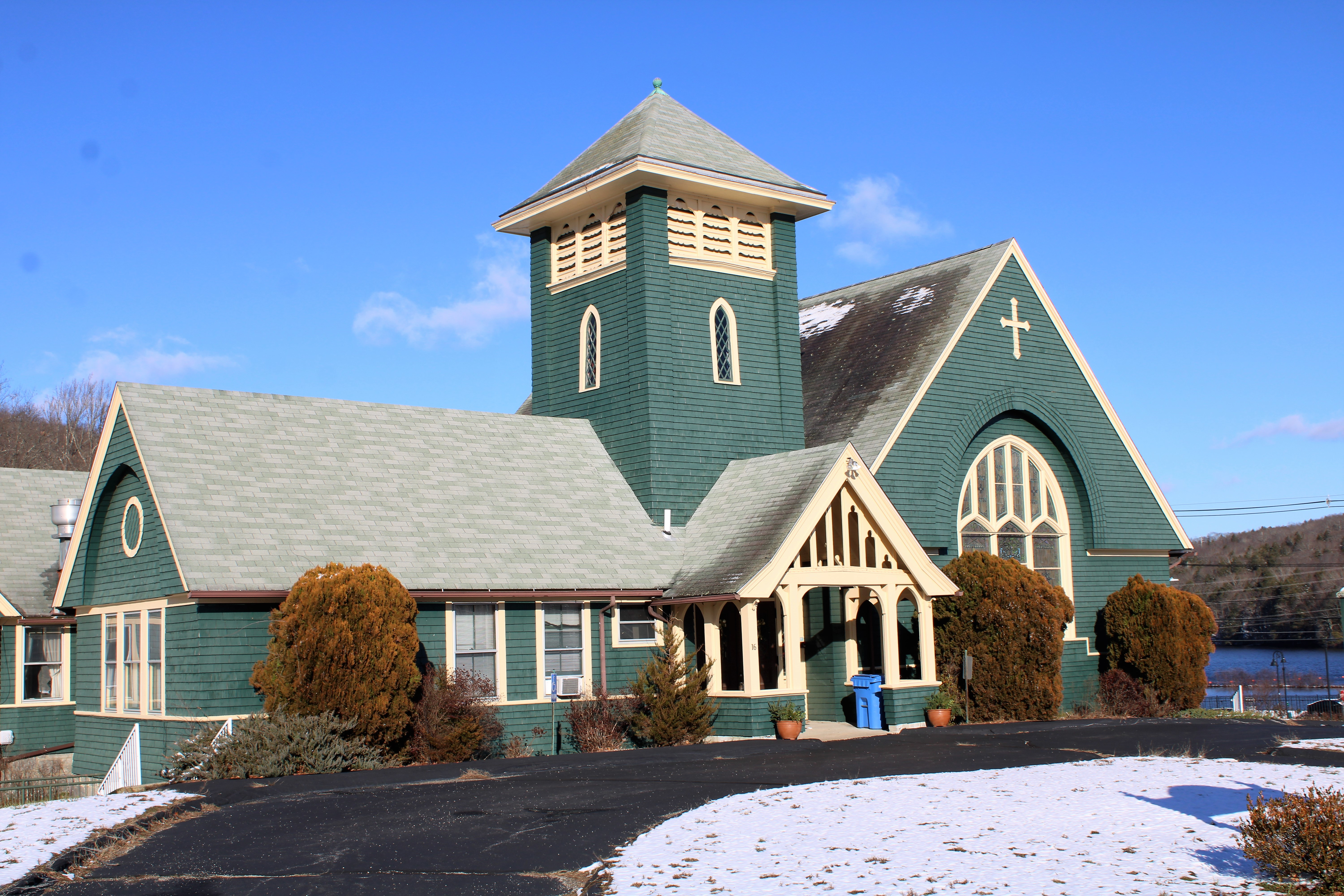
The former Taftville Congregational Church in Taftville, Connecticut, designed by Sawtelle and completed in 1904.

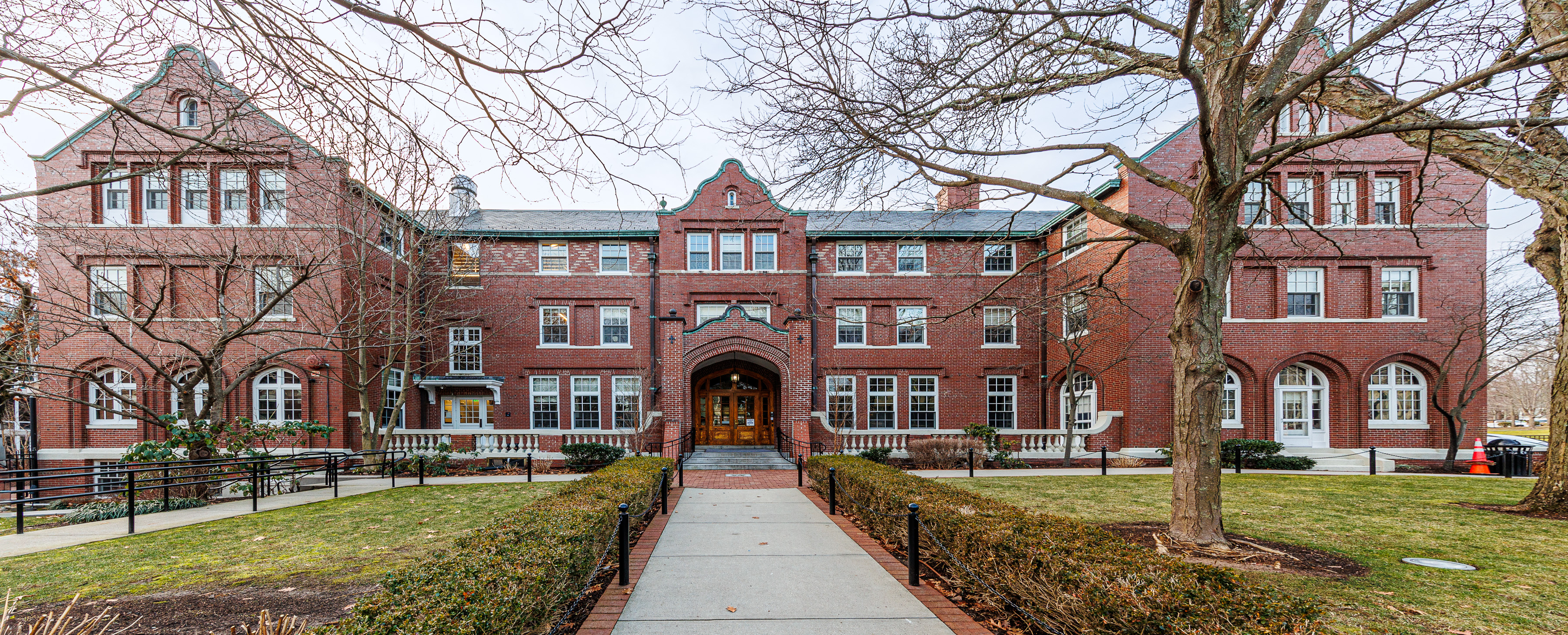
The Hope Building of the Wheeler School in Providence, Rhode Island, designed by Sawtelle with Frances E. Henley and completed by Henley alone in 1913.

Franklin J. Sawtelle FAIA (October 9, 1846 – March 9, 1911) was an American architect in practice in Providence, Rhode Island from 1880 until his death in 1911. Sawtelle had a varied practice but was best known for the design of single-family homes.

== Life and career ==
Sawtelle was born October 9, 1846 in Norridgewock, Maine to George Sawtelle and Sarah Herrick Sawtelle, nee Peet. He was educated in the local schools, and as a teenager began his architectural studies in the Portland office of Francis H. Fassett. In 1873 he relocated to Providence, taking a job with Stone & Carpenter. After seven years, in 1880, he opened his own office. He practiced independently for his entire career, except during 1901–1902, when he was senior member of the partnership of Sawtelle, Robertson & Shurrocks with Wayland T. Robertson and Alfred F. Shurrocks. Sawtelle died in 1911, while engaged on the commission for the Wheeler School. The school was completed by Sawtelle's associate, Frances E. Henley.

Sawtelle was actively involved in the local chapter of the American Institute of Architects. He joined in 1885, and between then and his death served in several different official capacities including as president from 1908 to 1910.

== Personal life ==
Sawtelle was married in 1873 to Delia Tappan of Norridgewock. They had no children. Sawtelle died March 9, 1911 in Providence at the age of 64.

== Architectural works ==
=== Franklin J. Sawtelle, 1880–1901 and 1902–1911 ===
- 1882 — James Street School, (Note: Demolished.) 75 James St, East Providence, Rhode Island
- 1883 — Mary C. Wheeler house, 26 Cabot St, Providence, Rhode Island
- 1884 — Horton Building, 19 Park St, Attleboro, Massachusetts
- 1885 — Bates Block, 7 N Main St, Attleboro, Massachusetts
- 1886 — Mary J. A. Grinnell house, (Note: A contributing resource to the Olney Street-Alumni Avenue Historic District, NRHP-listed in 1989.) 2 Brenton Ave, Providence, Rhode Island
- 1888 — Blackstone Park Chapel, 209 Wayland Ave, Providence, Rhode Island
- 1889 — Hope Webbing Company Mill, 999-1005 Main St, Pawtucket, Rhode Island
- 1889 — Horatio A. Hunt House, 165 Waterman St, Providence, Rhode Island
- 1891 — Gregory Building, (Note: A contributing resource to the Wickford Historic District, NRHP-listed in 1974.) 1 Main St, Wickford, Rhode Island
- 1893 — Sophia F. Brown house, 192 Bowen St, Providence, Rhode Island
- 1893 — Central Congregational Church, (Note: Designed by Carrère & Hastings, architects, with Franklin J. Sawtelle, associate architect.) 296 Angell St, Providence, Rhode Island
- 1893 — Central Congregational Church rectory, (Note: A contributing resource to the Stimson Avenue Historic District, NRHP-listed in 1973.) 20 Diman Pl, Providence, Rhode Island
- 1893 — Stephen W. Sessions house, 274 Olney St, Providence, Rhode Island
- 1894 — Miro O. Weeden house, 81 Brown St, Providence, Rhode Island
- 1895 — Edwin P. Anthony house, (Note: A contributing resource to the College Hill Historic District, NRHP-listed in 1970.) 180 Angell St, Providence, Rhode Island
- 1895 — Theodore H. Bliss house, (Note: A contributing resource to the Hope–Power–Cooke Streets Historic District, NRHP-listed in 1973.) 46 Cooke St, Providence, Rhode Island
- 1896 — Charles A. Calder house, (Note: A contributing resource to the Wayland Historic District, NRHP-listed in 2005.) 50 Humboldt Ave, Providence, Rhode Island
- 1896 — Francis W. Carpenter house, 276 Angell St, Providence, Rhode Island
- 1898 — North Kingstown Free Library (former), 55 Brown St, Wickford, Rhode Island
- 1904 — Taftville Congregational Church, (Note: A contributing resource to the Taftville historic district, NRHP-listed in 1978.) 16 N B St, Taftville, Connecticut
- 1905 — Smith-Malmstead house, 77 Princeton Ave, Providence, Rhode Island
- 1906 — Sarah L. Herreshoff house, (Note: A contributing resource to the Bristol Waterfront Historic District, NRHP-listed in 1975.) 11 Burton St, Bristol, Rhode Island
- 1909 — C. Abbott Phillips house, (Note: A contributing resource to the Blackstone Boulevard–Cole Avenue–Grotto Avenue Historic District, NRHP-listed in 2009.) 150 Slater Ave, Providence, Rhode Island
- 1911 — Church of Our Father (former), (Note: Assisted by Frances E. Henley.) 222 High St, Pawtucket, Rhode Island
- 1913 — Wheeler School Hope Building, (Note: Designed in association with Frances E. Henley, who completed the project alone after his death.) 216 Hope St, Providence, Rhode Island

=== Sawtelle, Robertson & Shurrocks, 1901–1902 ===
- 1902 — U. S. Post Office, 652-656 Broadway, Olneyville, Providence, Rhode Island
- 1902 — Mary L. McCarthy duplex, 71-73 Barnes St, Providence, Rhode Island
- 1902 — Charles M. Mumford house, 315 Olney St, Providence, Rhode Island
- 1902 — Robert B. Parker house, 67 Manning St, Providence, Rhode Island
- 1902 — Simeon B. Tilley house, (Note: Demolished. Formerly a contributing resource to the Olney Street-Alumni Avenue Historic District, NRHP-listed in 1989.) 353 Olney St, Providence, Rhode Island
