= King's Chapel =

Unitarian chapel in Massachusetts, US

- U.S. National Register of Historic Places
- U.S. National Historic Landmark
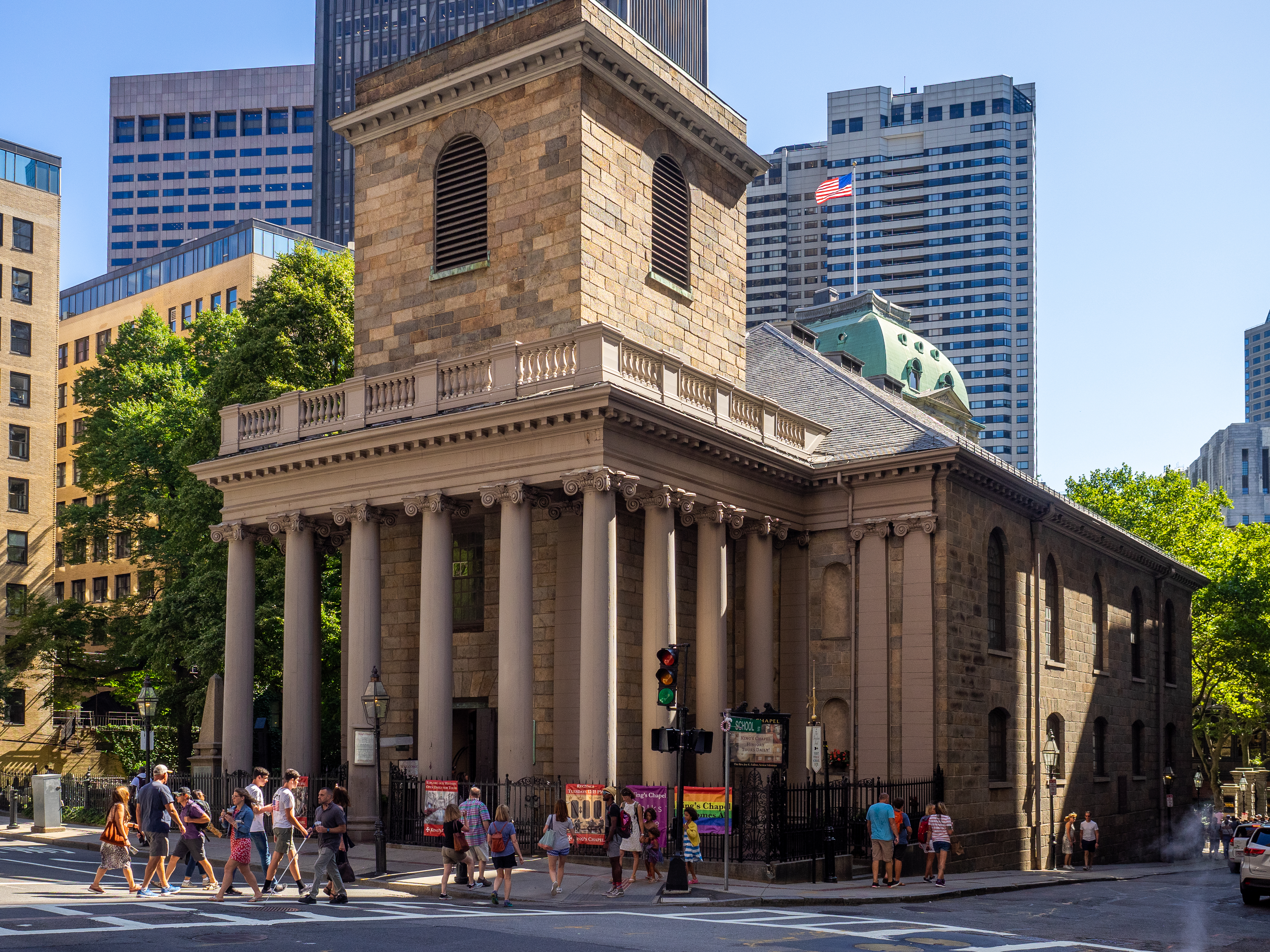
- 2019

- Location within Boston Location within Massachusetts Location within the United States
- Interactive map of King's Chapel
- Location: Tremont and School Streets, Boston, Massachusetts, U.S.
- Coordinates: 42°21′29″N 71°03′36″W
- Built: 1754
- Architect: Peter Harrison
- Architectural style: Georgian
- NRHP reference No.: 74002045

Significant dates
- Added to NRHP: May 2, 1974
- Designated NHL: October 9, 1960

King's Chapel is an independent Unitarian congregation in Boston, Massachusetts, United States. It is affiliated with the Unitarian Universalist Association and describes itself as "Unitarian Christian in theology, Anglican in worship, and congregational in governance." It is housed in what was for a time after the American Revolution called the "Stone Chapel", an 18th-century structure at the corner of Tremont Street and School Street. The chapel building, completed in 1754, is one of the finest designs of the noted colonial architect Peter Harrison, and was designated a National Historic Landmark in 1960 for its architectural significance. The congregation has worshipped according to a Unitarian version of the Book of Common Prayer since 1785, currently in its ninth edition.

King's Chapel adjoins Old City Hall. Despite its name, the adjacent King's Chapel Burying Ground is not affiliated with the chapel or any other church; it pre-dates the present church by over a century.

== History ==
The King's Chapel congregation was founded by Royal Governor Sir Edmund Andros in 1686 as the first Anglican Church in colonial New England during the reign of King James II. The original King's Chapel was a wooden church built in 1688 at the corner of Tremont and School Streets, where the church stands today. It was situated on the public burying ground, now King's Chapel Burying Ground, because no resident would sell land for a church that was not Congregationalist (at the time, the Congregational church was the official religion of Massachusetts).

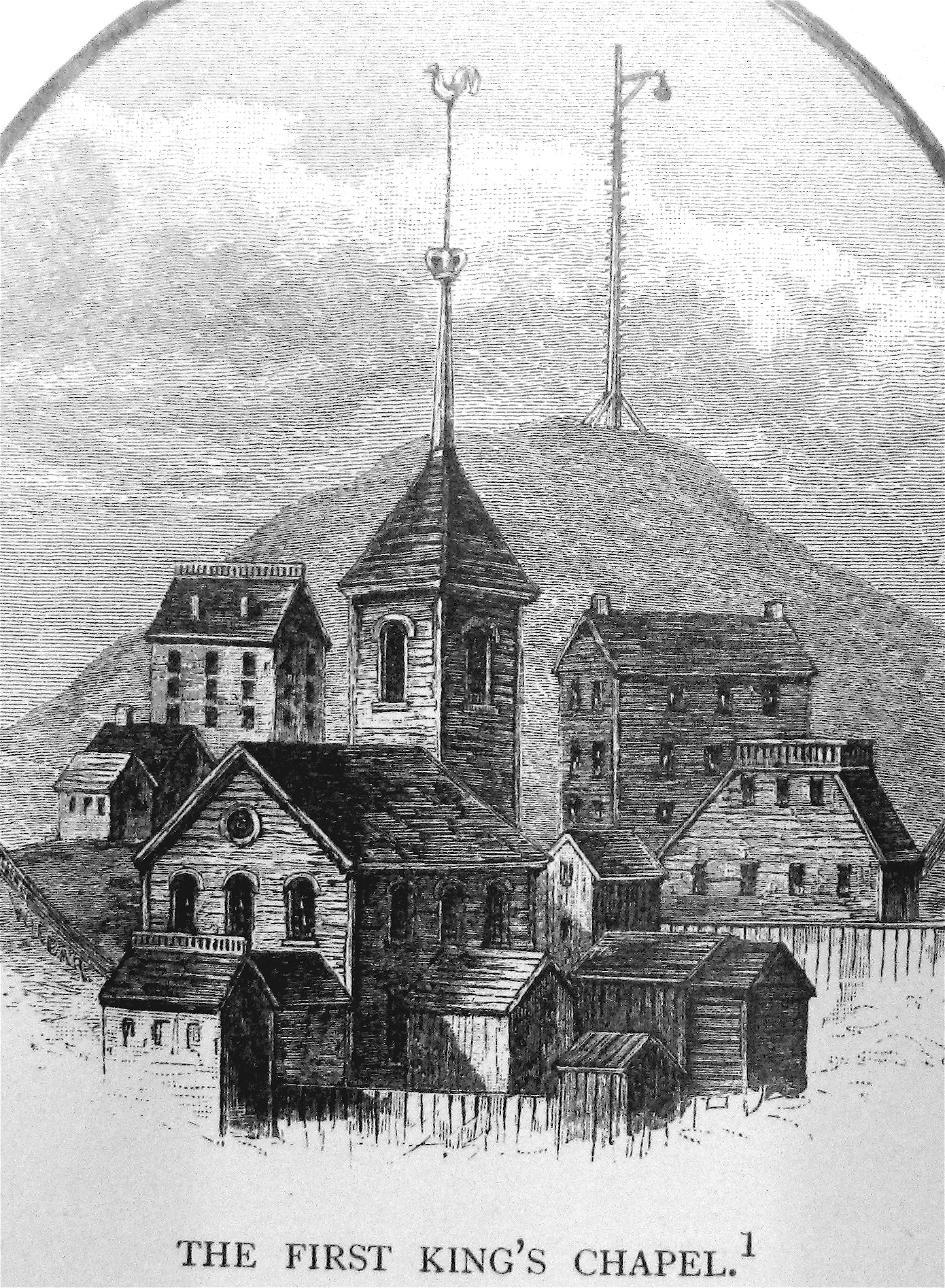
1688 King's Chapel building (later disassembled)

In 1749, construction began on the current stone structure, which was designed by Peter Harrison and completed in 1754. The stone church was built around the wooden church. When the stone church was complete, the wooden church was disassembled and removed through the windows of the new church. The wood was then shipped to Lunenburg, Nova Scotia, where it was used to construct St. John's Anglican Church. That church was destroyed by fire on Halloween night, 2001. It has since been rebuilt. Originally, there were plans to add a steeple, although funding shortfalls prevented this from happening.

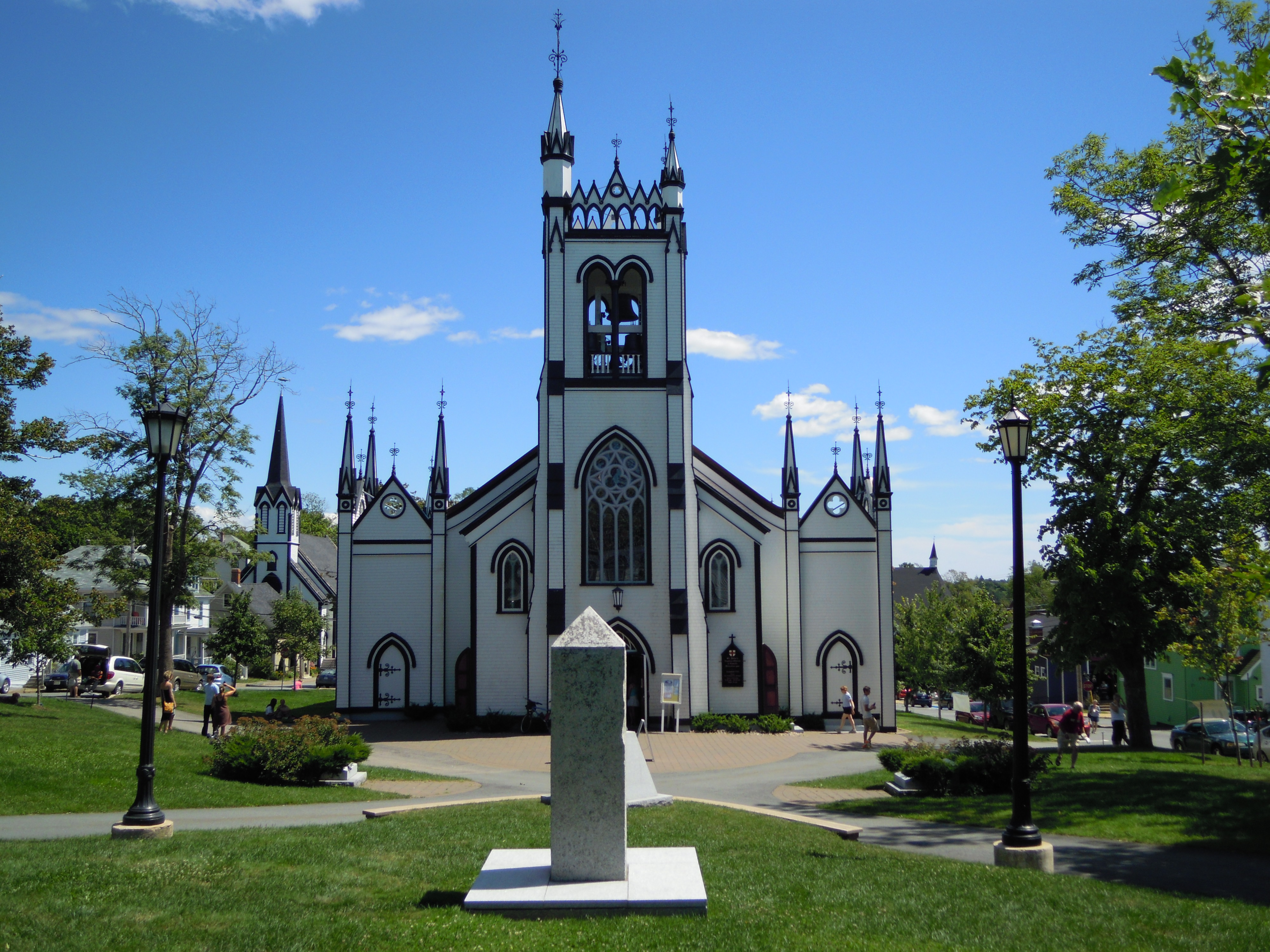
Original King's Chapel after reconstruction as the St. John's Anglican Church in Nova Scotia (1754)

During the American Revolution, the chapel sat vacant and was referred to as the "Stone Chapel". The Loyalist families left for Nova Scotia and England, and those who remained reopened the church in 1782. It became Unitarian under the ministry of James Freeman, who revised the 1662 English edition of the Book of Common Prayer along Unitarian lines in 1785. Although Freeman still considered King's Chapel to be Episcopalian, the Episcopal Church's first bishop Samuel Seabury refused to ordain him. The church still follows its own Anglican-style hybrid liturgy. It is a member congregation of the Unitarian Universalist Association.

Frederick Herbert Torrington, the founder of the Toronto College of Music, was organist at King's Chapel from 1869-1873.

== Interior ==
Inside King's Chapel

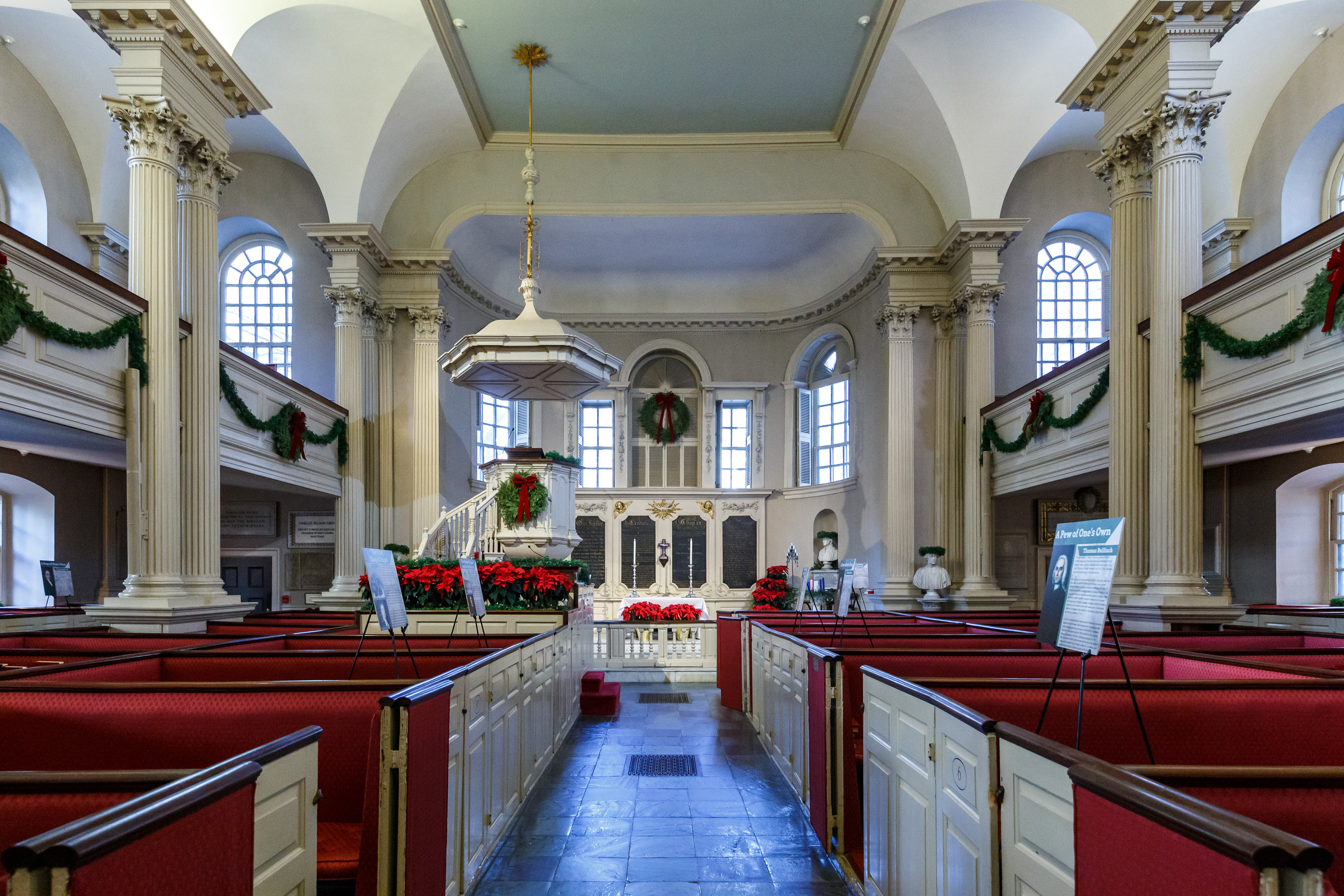
looking toward pulpit

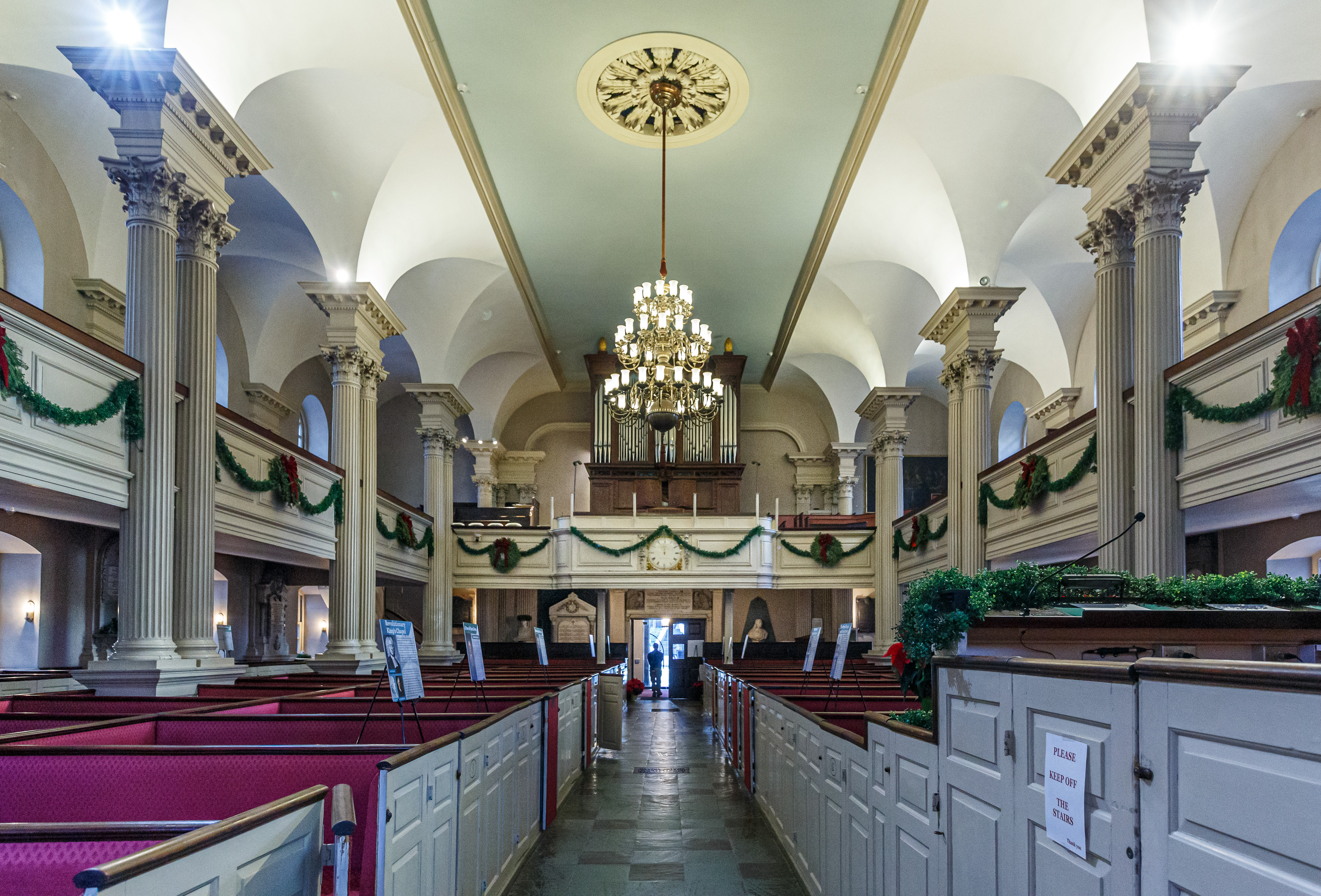
Looking toward rear

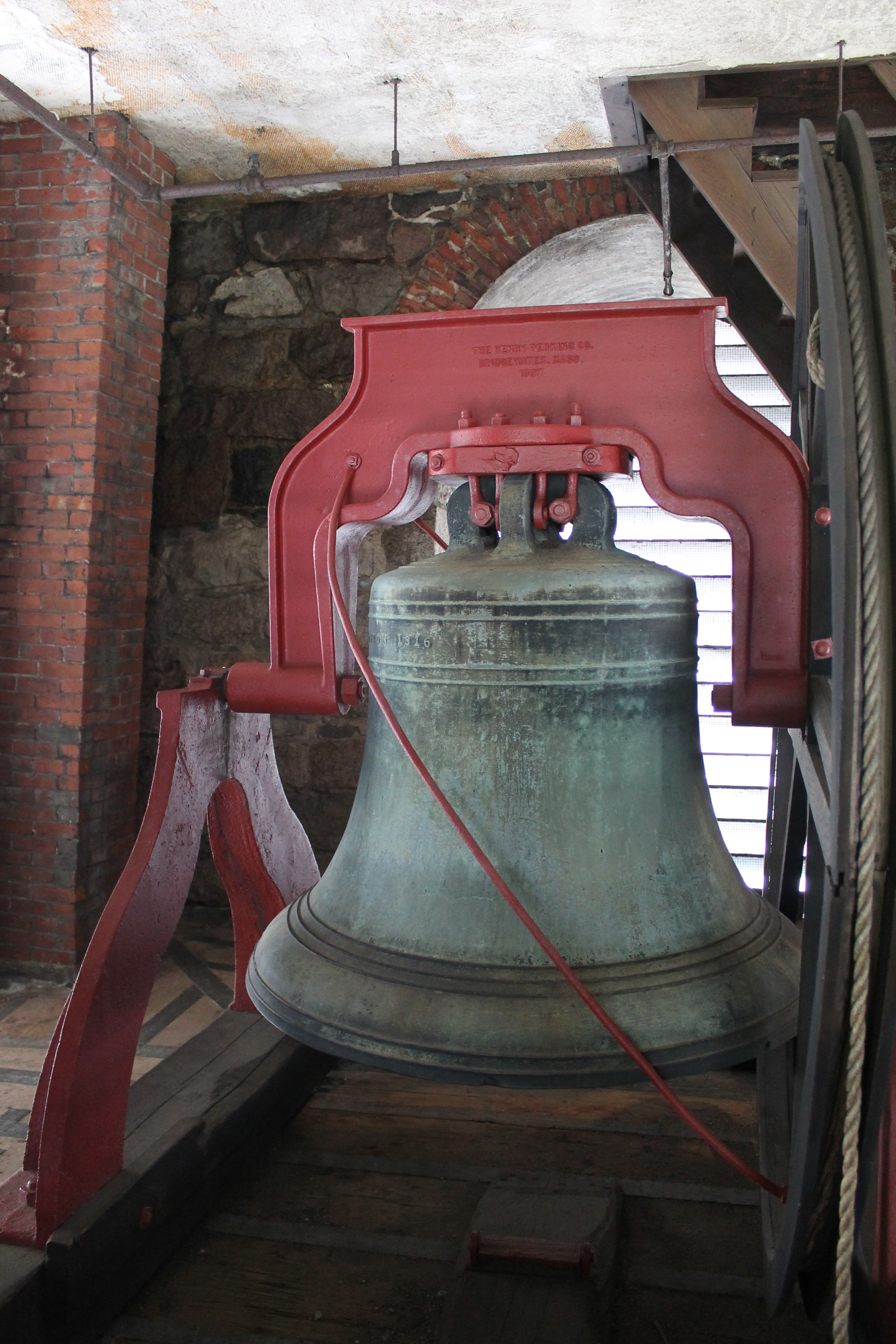
Revere bell

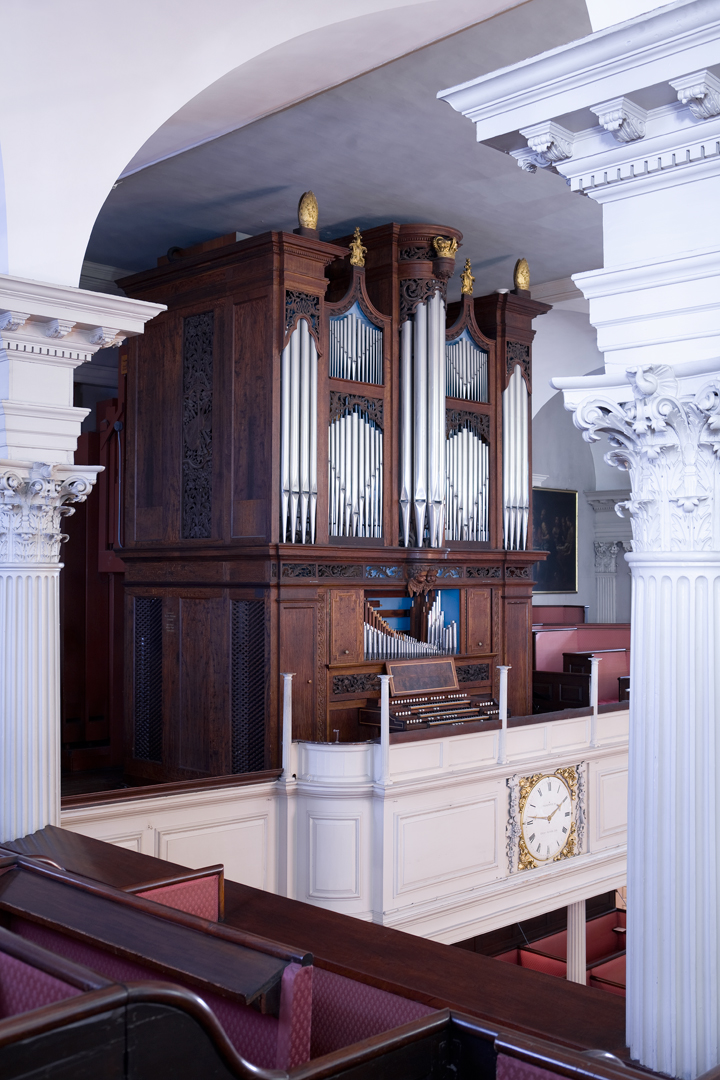
Organ

Inside, the church is characterized by wooden columns with Corinthian capitals that were hand-carved by William Burbeck and his apprentices in 1758. The pulpit and inscribed wooden panels behind the altar are older than the present chapel; the pulpit dates to the early 18th century and the altar panels to the late 17th century. Both were originally part of the wooden chapel that predated the present stone building.

Seating in the chapel provided in box pews, most of which were originally owned by the member families who paid pew rent and decorated the pews to their personal tastes. Additional seating was provided in balconies on either side of the nave, level with the organ loft and choir benches. The current uniform appearance of the pews dates from the 1920s.

Pew No. 30 is the Governor's Pew, originally reserved for Jonathan Belcher, then Royal Governor of Massachusetts. Belcher's son, Jonathan Jr., was wed in the chapel in 1756. On October 27, 1789, the Governor's Pew was occupied by George Washington.

Music has long been an important part of King's Chapel, which acquired its first organ in 1713, bequeathed to the congregation by Puritan minister Thomas Brattle. Other organs that followed were built by Richard Bridge, Hook & Hastings, and Simmons & Willcox. The fifth organ installed in the chapel was a large 1909 E.M. Skinner organ. It had been a gift from Frank E. Peabody in memory of his deceased son Everett. The present organ, the sixth installed in King's Chapel, was built by C.B. Fisk in 1964. It is decorated with miters and carvings from the Bridge organ of 1756, and it is slightly below average in size compared with most mid-1900s European chapel organs. For forty-two years starting in 1958, the eminent American composer Daniel Pinkham was the organist and music director at King's Chapel. He was succeeded by Heinrich Christensen.

The King's Chapel bell, cast in England, was hung in 1772. In 1814 it cracked, was recast by Paul Revere and Sons, and was rehung. It is the largest bell cast by the Revere foundry, and the last one cast during Paul Revere's lifetime. It has been rung at services ever since.

Within King's Chapel is a monument to Samuel Vassall, brother of the colonist William Vassall, a patentee of the Massachusetts Bay Company, and an early deputy of the Massachusetts Bay Colony. Samuel Vassall of London was also named a member of the Company in its 1629 royal charter but never sailed for New England, instead remaining in London to tend to business affairs; his brother William frequently clashed with John Winthrop, and eventually removed himself to Scituate, Massachusetts. The monument to Vassall, London merchant, mentions his resistance to King Charles's taxes imposed on Tonnage and Poundage, especially as Parliament had refused the King's request for a lifetime extension. Vassall subsequently represented the City of London as a Member of Parliament (1640–1641), which restored some of Vassall's estate. Later Vassalls in Massachusetts, including William Vassall for whom Vassalboro, Maine was named, were Loyalists and fled to England during the American Revolutionary War.

== Ministers ==
Raymond Clark Robinson (1884–1945) was organist at King's Chapel from 1923 to 1945.

- Robert Ratcliff, rector 1686–1689
- Samuel Myles, rector 1689–1728 (d. 1728)
- Roger Price, rector 1729–1746
- Henry Caner, rector 1747–1776
- James Freeman, rector 1787–1836 (d.1836)
- Samuel Cary, minister 1809–1815 (d.1815)
- F.W.P. Greenwood, minister 1824–1843 (d. 1843)
- Ephraim Peabody, minister 1845–1856 (d. 1856)
- no regular minister 1856–1861
- Henry Wilder Foote, minister 1861–1889 (d. 1889)
- no regular minister 1889–1895
- Howard Nicholson Brown, minister 1895–1921
- Harold Edwin Balme Speight, minister 1921–1927
- John Carroll Perkins, minister in charge 1927–1931, minister 1931–1933 (guardian of Emily Hale)
- Palfrey Perkins, minister 1933–1953
- Joseph Barth, minister 1953–1965 (d. 1988)
- no regular minister 1965–1967
- Carl R. Scovel, senior minister 1967–1999
- Charles C. Forman, affiliate minister 1980–1998 (d. 1998)
- Matthew M. McNaught, interim minister 1999–2001
- Earl K. Holt, minister 2001–2009
- Dianne E. Arakawa, interim minister 2009–2013
- Joy Fallon, minister 2013–present

== Gallery ==
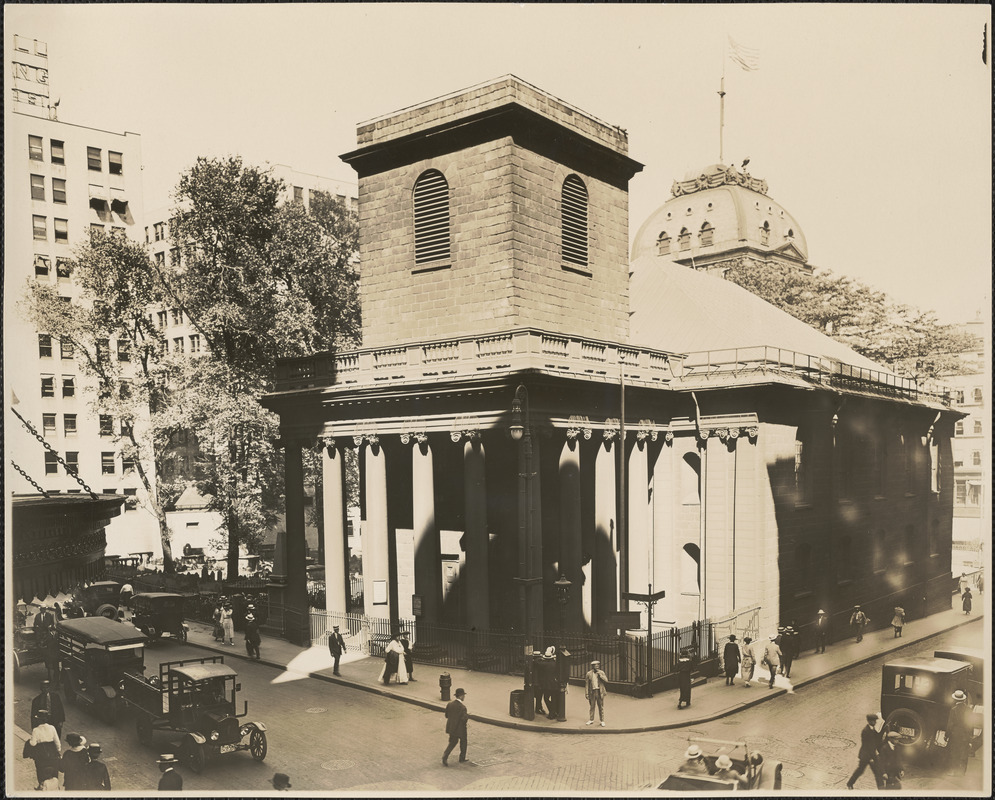
King's Chapel at Tremont Street and School Street, Boston, Mass., June 1920. Leon Abdalian Collection.

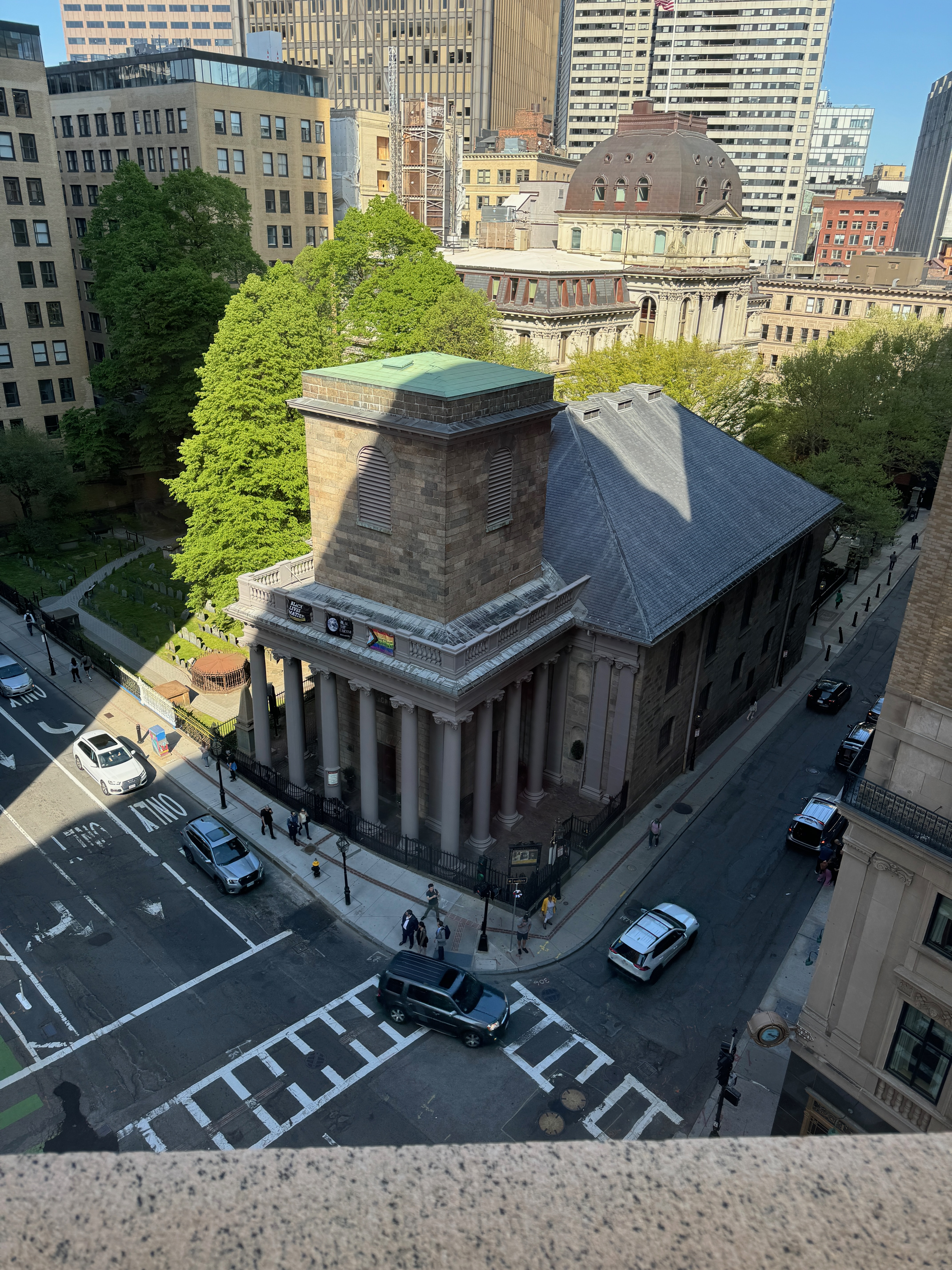
Aerial view, 2024

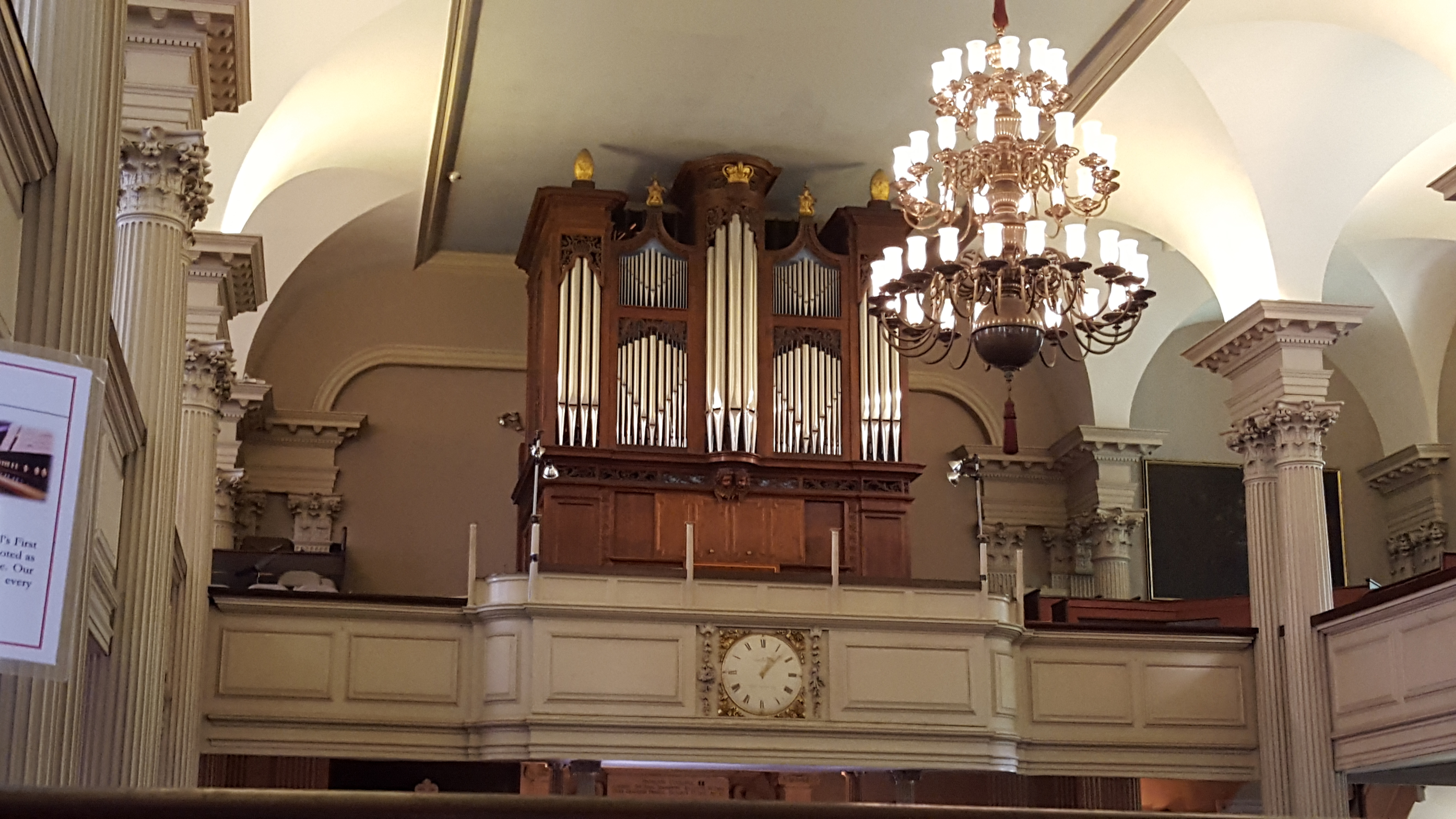
Kings Chapel Organ, 2015

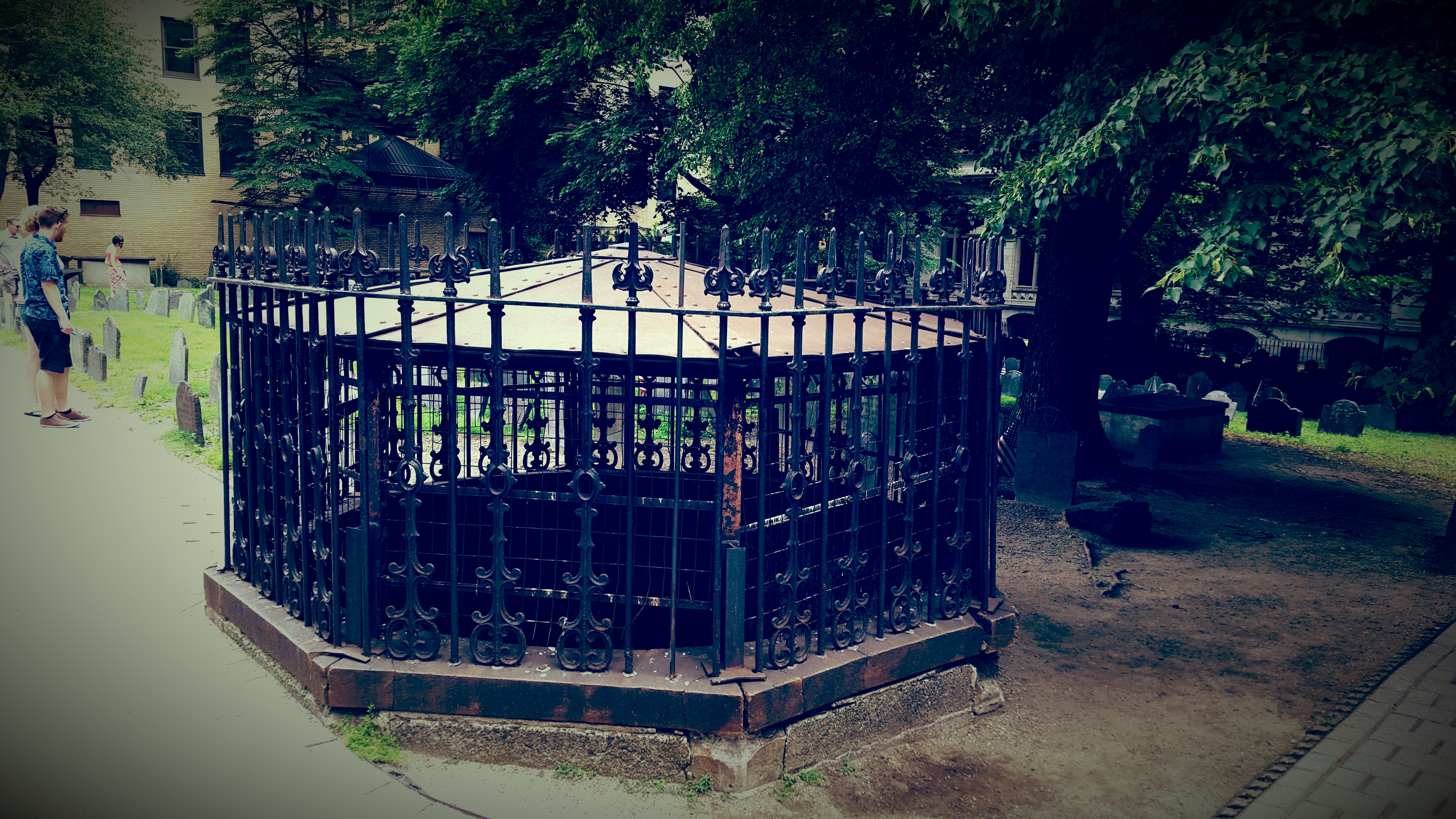
Boston Subway ventilation shaft in the Kings Chapel Burying Ground

== See also ==
- List of National Historic Landmarks in Boston
- National Register of Historic Places listings in northern Boston, Massachusetts

Preceded by Granary Burying Ground	Locations along Boston's Freedom Trail; King's Chapel	Succeeded by King's Chapel Burying Ground
