= Hope Webbing Company Mill =

- U.S. National Register of Historic Places
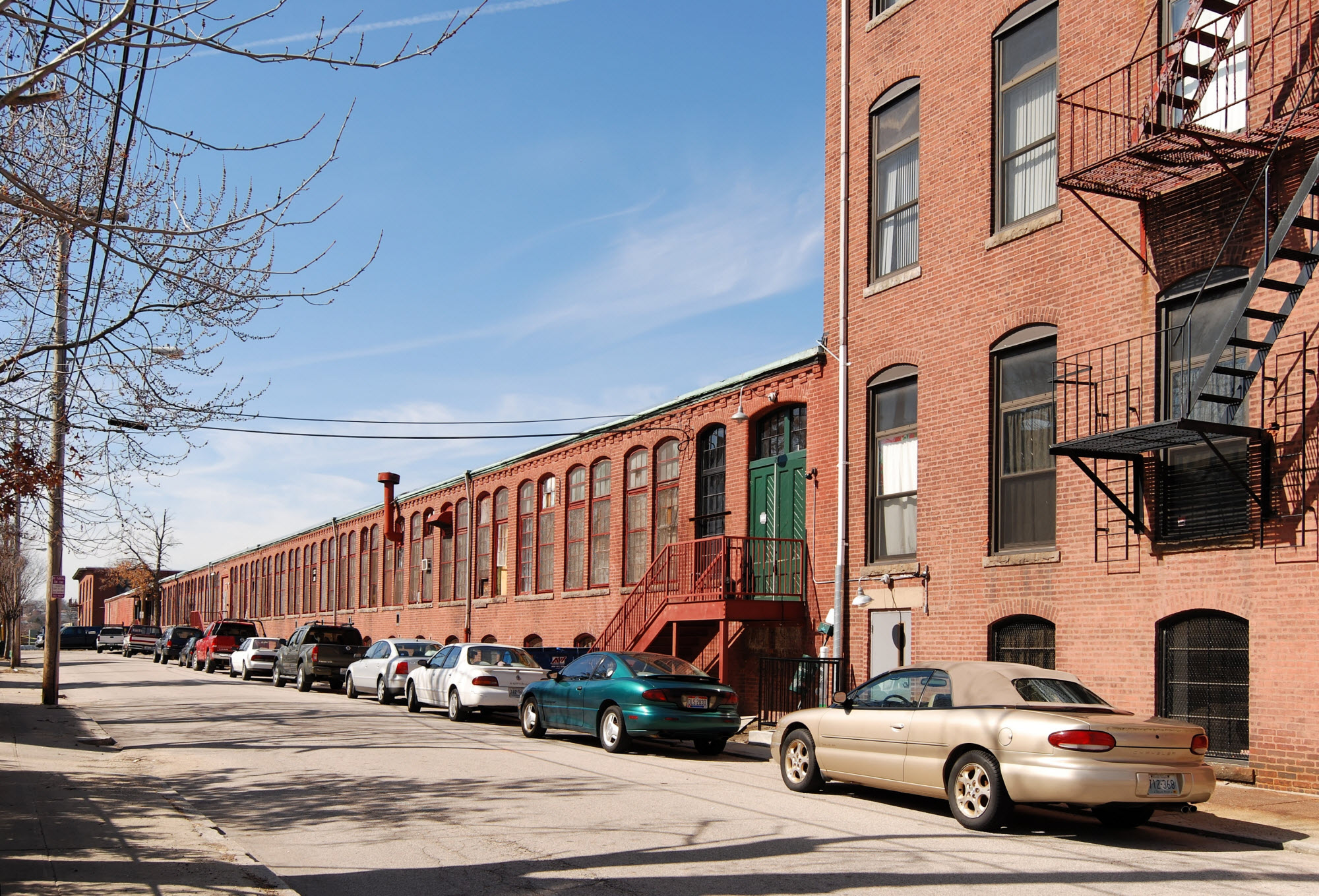

- Location within Rhode Island Location within the United States
- Location: Pawtucket, Rhode Island
- Coordinates: 41°51′46″N 71°24′4″W
- Area: 7 acres (2.8 ha)
- Built: 1889
- Built by: Maguire & Penniman
- Architect: Franklin J. Sawtelle
- NRHP reference No.: 06000297
- Added to NRHP: April 19, 2006

The Hope Webbing Company Mill is a historic textile mill at 999-1005 Main Street in Pawtucket, Rhode Island. The three brick buildings on this 7-acre (2.8 ha) are the surviving elements of what was once a larger complex, extending across Esten Avenue. The oldest portion of the main mill and the boiler house were built in 1889, with the mill growing by numerous additions through 1914. The preparing building was built in 1902 and enlarged in 1913. The Hope Webbing Company was established in 1883, and used these premises to manufacture narrow fabrics (less than 6 inches (15 cm) in width) using many different types of fibers, including cotton, jute, wool, and silk. The company occupied all or part of the premises until 1994, when it moved its remaining production to Cumberland.

The mill was listed on the National Register of Historic Places in 2006.

== See also ==
- National Register of Historic Places listings in Pawtucket, Rhode Island
