= Revere bells =

Bells cast by the Revere Copper Company

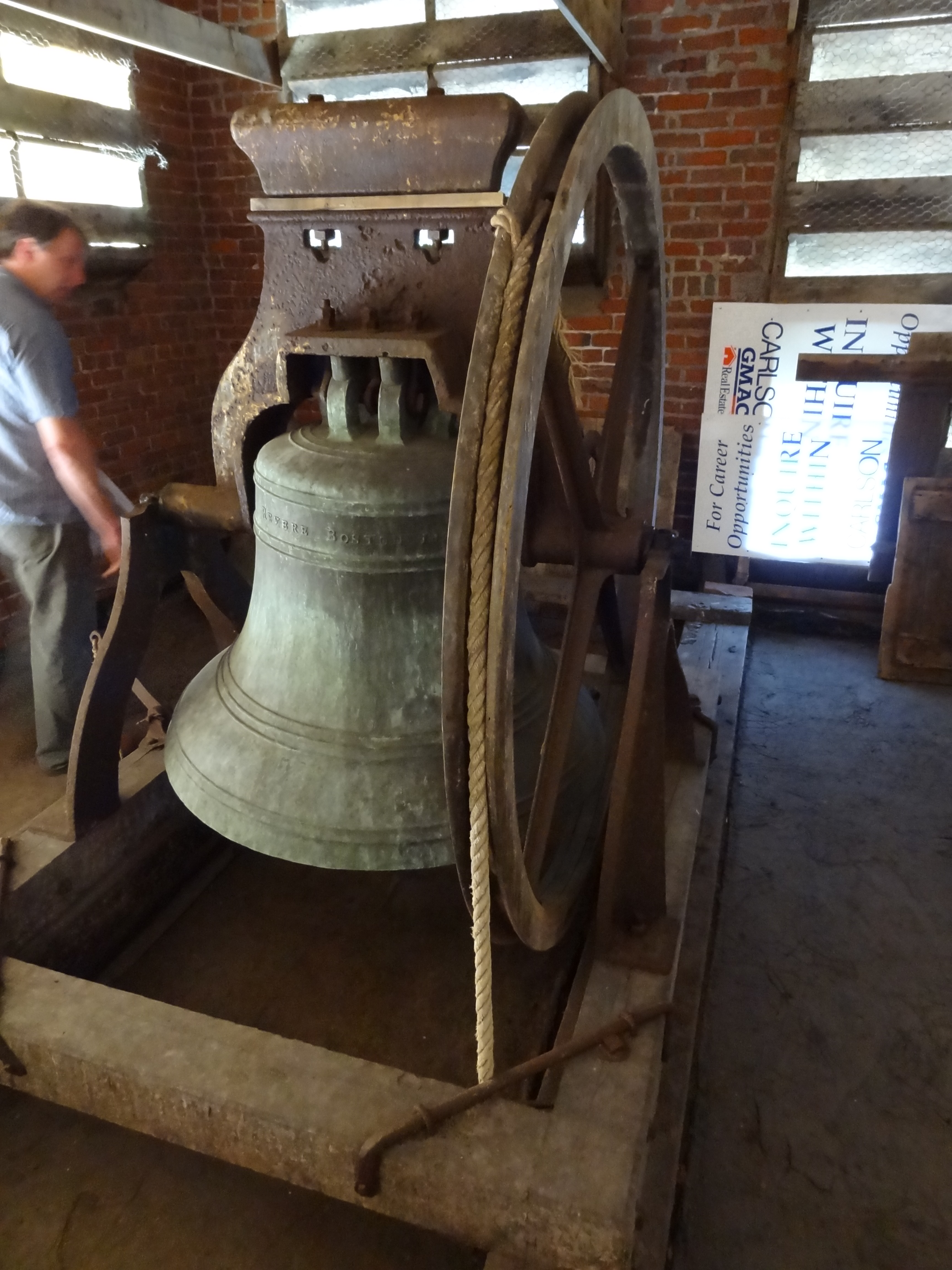
The 1822 Revere bell of Pawtucket Congregational Church in Lowell, Massachusetts

Revere bells were cast out of the bell foundry of Paul Revere starting in 1792 in Boston. Revere became known professionally for his foundries and for being one of the few competent bell makers in the United States at the time.

Paul Revere opened his bell foundry in the Boston's North End and, between the years 1792 and 1828, the foundry cast a total of 398 bells that varied from 500 to 2,500 pounds (230 to 1,130 kg). The vast majority of Revere's bells have pleasant tones, are long lasting, and served as centerpieces of their communities. They were used in schools, on ships and for communication. For example, a church bell tolled during a fire, let the community know of a death or wedding, and signaled the start of mass. An example of the longevity of his bells comes from Henry W. Owen who spoke of the Revere bell at Bath City Hall in 1936:

For more than a century (the bell) was rung daily morning, noon and evening, at stated hours, besides announcing hours of religious services and alarms of fire, tolling for departed citizens, and pealing in honor of independence days and other occasions of joy. On account of its age it has been retired from regular duty, but still on special occasions is sparingly used.

== History ==
Revere bells

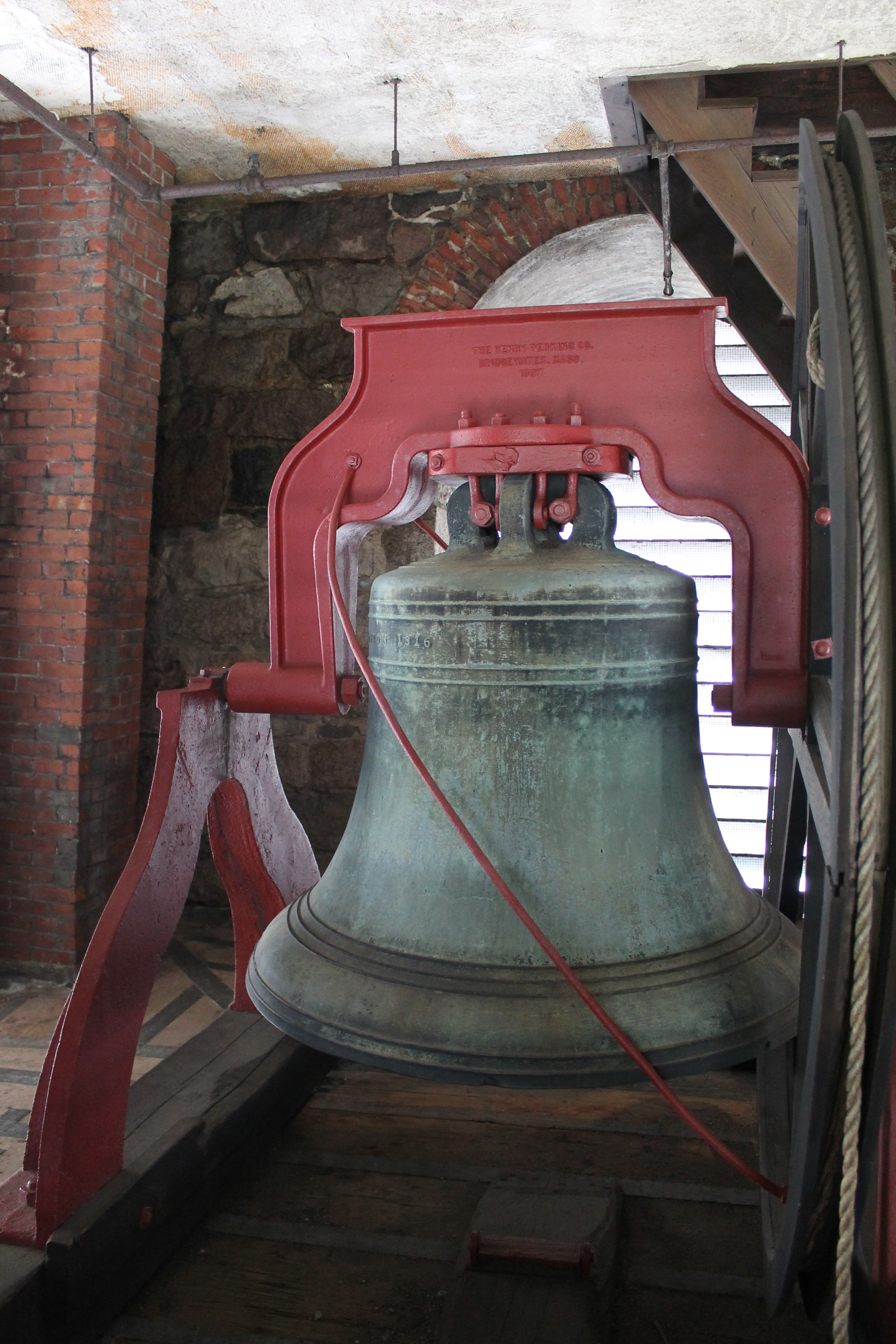
King's Chapel in Boston

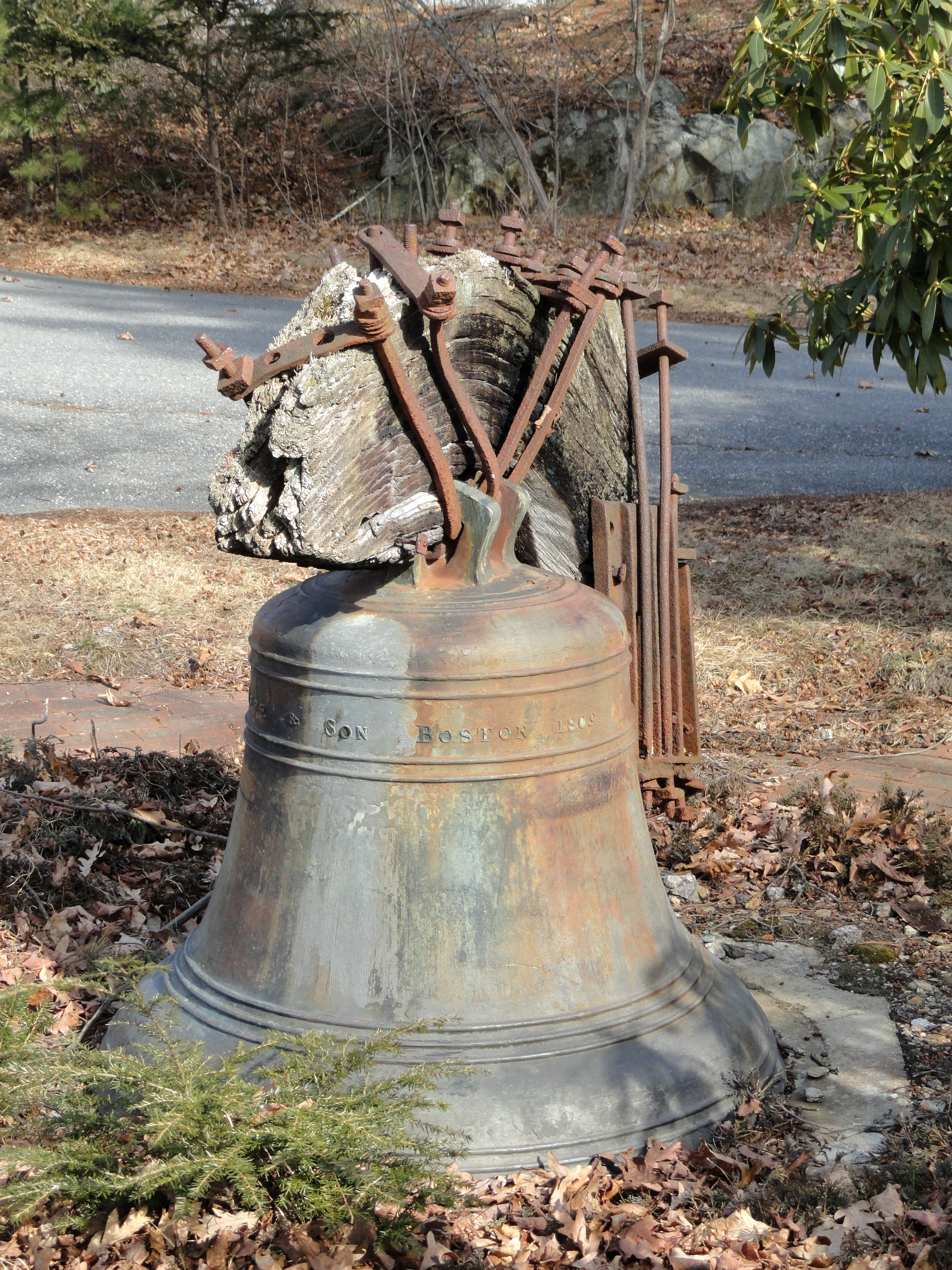
First Parish Church Unitarian Universalist in Northborough, Massachusetts

Paul Revere cast his first bell for the Second Church in Boston. As a church member, he offered to take up the challenge of recasting the church's cracked bell himself, despite the fact that he had no previous experience in the craft. For guidance, he turned to one of America's few knowledgeable bell casters: Aaron Hobart, a Massachusetts acquaintance. But even with Hobart's guidance, Revere's first bell had a poor tone quality and contained visible imperfections, "[unlike any other of] the more than one hundred bells his shop produced during the period of his active involvement". A century later, a reverend in the same church, Edward G. Porter, expounded upon it in a chapter of his Rambles in Old Boston titled "A Noted Bell". The reverend appreciated the bell for all the civil functions it had punctuated with its sound, and claimed that it "deserves a place among the famous bells of the world."

Many of Revere's initial failures can be attributed to the lack of standardization in bell founding at the time. Correspondences and records from Revere show that he probably used existing bells as models for his own, as he had no scientific understanding of how to optimize their shape. However, after experimentation and working with masters in the craft, Revere eventually produced bells praised for their pleasant sound. Joseph Warren Revere claimed that "we know we can cast as good bells as can be cast in the world, both for goodness and for sound."

The ability to cast items as large as bells led to the development of other areas of Revere's business. The establishment of his foundry started a paradigm shift as he realized his "air furnace" could be used for different metals, alloys, and for very large pieces. After 1792, Revere expanded his range of products to include items such as cannons. His products became so varied that many found hard to believe it was all the work of a single man. Bell casting also led to a change in his career path, as he began to use his skills to improve his societal image and standing. While his excellence in manufacturing made him a respected craftsman, Revere's role in pioneering bell manufacturing in the United States propelled him to a higher social status. This new prestige allowed him to gain government contracts and play a role in improving America's technological infrastructure. Thus, he continued his service to his country while furthering his career as an entrepreneur.

During the time of his active employment, Revere's foundry made over one hundred bells as recorded in the official family stock books and ledgers. The highly artistic nature of the bell making craft resulted in a high degree of customization for each bell, which made standardization almost impossible. As a result, Revere's personal involvement in his bells declined as other aspects of his business gained greater success. In 1804, Revere formed a partnership with his son, Joseph Warren Revere, to share equally in the work and profits of the bell making venture. This partnership lasted until 1811, when it was disbanded and replaced by a new partnership, "Paul Revere and Son," between Joseph Warren Revere and Paul Revere's grandsons Paul 3rd and Thomas Eayres Jr. Joseph Warren Revere took the primary role in the bell foundry and continued the business after his father's death in 1818. The last bell listed in the official stock books of Revere & Son is dated in 1828, the same year when the company was incorporated into Revere Copper Company, with Joseph Revere as the president. The Revere Copper Company continued to make bells with the inscription "Revere Boston" until 1843.

== Types of Revere bells ==
Revere made bells for numerous applications, ranging from huge church bells to small school bells. The performance requirements and hence, the design for each of these types of bells was very different. Because of this wide range of requirements, Revere required every customer to come into the foundry and listen to the bell he had made to ensure they were satisfied before they left.

=== Church bells ===
Church bells in Revere's time served as a method of communication within each town—the evidence suggests that churchgoers valued the quality of the bell's acoustics, the distance from which one could hear the bell and the persistence of the ring. Church bells were of great importance in these colonial communities, as there were few clocks in that day and because they signified events of great importance such as funerals and weddings.

=== Other kinds of bells ===
Revere's foundry also produced school bells and smaller bells for shipyards and factories, in later years.

== Metallurgy ==
=== Design and composition ===
Revere designed church bells with a large diameter which allowed the bell sound to travel greater distances. For example, the King Chapel bell had a diameter of 49 inches and a weight of nearly 2500 lbs. At a time when churches were the center of civic life and the only form of mass communication, sound intensity was an important factor. Other customers, like shipbuilders and schools, usually did not need such large bells because their audience was in a closer proximity.

The composition of the bronze bells produced by Paul Revere was usually around 77% copper, 21% tin, and a small percentage of unintentional impurities such as zinc, lead, nickel, and silicon. Revere was knowledgeable about the integrity of his metal and at one point even corresponded with an expert in London about the purity of the tin of his supplier. Revere also occasionally used a pinch of silver in his composition which draws from the superstition of the time that silver added a nice tone to bells.

=== Production and tuning ===
Revere purchased several core molds that he used when making his bells. He and his coworkers would pack mud very precisely into the exact shape of the interior of the bell, apply tallow and wax to the exterior, then cover it in a layer of mud. Aaron Hobart taught Revere how to make the mud for the bell: "one part horse dung, one sand, and one part clay. For nowel and cope, six parts horse dung, one-sand, one-clay and some cow horn." The model would then be heated from below, allowing the wax to drip out and the mud would harden into the bell mold. Molten bronze would be poured and cooled. After the cast bell was removed from the mold, Revere and his employees would painstakingly clean, polish, and tune the bell by hand. After casting and polishing the bells, Paul Revere generally mounted his bells using a cast and then tuned the bells by removing metal from the interior of the bell. This practice of tuning with a tuning hammer continued into the early 20th century. Throughout the tuning process, the notes made by striking the bell were frequently compared with the tones made by a tuning fork.

== Examples of bells ==
Paul Revere listed 84 bells in his stock book. Most bells remain in New England; however, some have been relocated. A list of bells noted in Revere's stock book, their respective size has been created by Edward and Evelyn Stickney.

=== Revere bell in Singapore ===
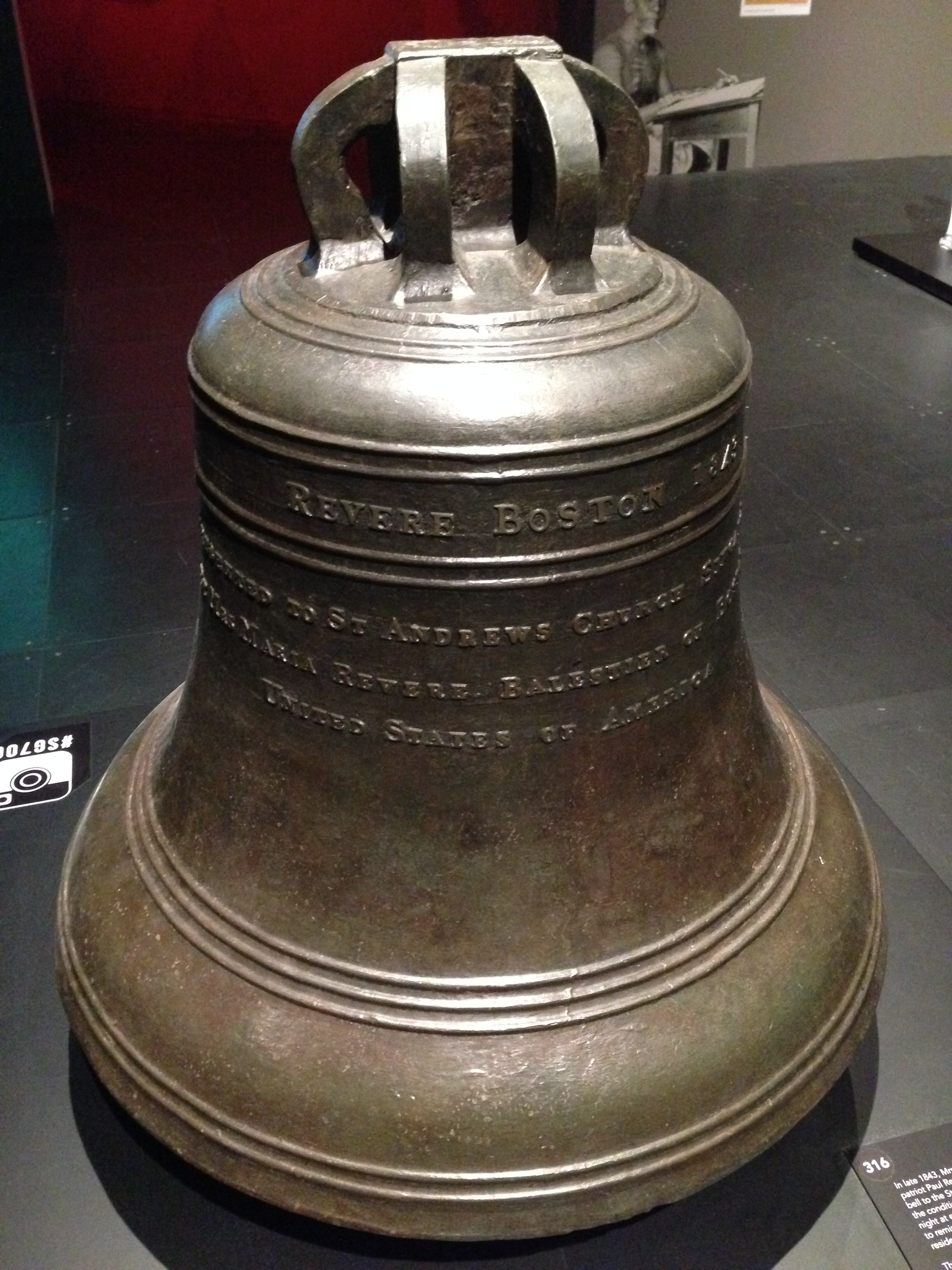
Singapore's Revere Bell on display at the National Museum of Singapore in February 2015. The inscription of the bell is: "Revere, Boston 1843. Presented to St Andrew's Church, Singapore, by Mrs Maria Revere Balestier of Boston, United States of America".

The Revere Bell in Singapore was a gift by Mrs. Maria Revere Balestier, the daughter of Paul Revere and wife of the first American Consul to Singapore, Joseph Balestier. The only Revere bell outside the United States, it is 81 centimetres (32 in) in height and 89 centimetres (35 in) in diameter with a clapper underneath. Maria Revere presented the bell to the first Church of St. Andrew in 1843 on condition that it be used to sound a curfew for five minutes at 8:00 pm every night. The curfew bell rang until 1855 when the church was demolished, and was resumed when St. Andrew's Cathedral was constructed in its place in 1861 until it was permanently discontinued in 1874. The bell entered the collection of the Raffles Museum, now the National Museum of Singapore, in 1937. It is regarded as a symbol of friendship between the peoples of Singapore and the United States.

=== First bell: New Brick Church ===
In 1792, Revere entered the bell founding business when the bell of the New Brick Church, the church he attended, cracked upon relocation. After salvaging about 500 pounds of metal from the old bell and enlisting the help of Aaron Hobart, Revere cast his first bell. The bell did not get the best reviews. Reverend William Bentley remarked that "the sound is not clear and prolonged, from the lips to the crown shrill." Even though the bell did not have a pleasant sound, it was a momentous achievement because it was the first bell cast in Boston, instead of the usual casting in England.

=== Largest bell: First Congregational Church ===
At 2488 lbs, the bell cast for the First Congregational Church (now the First Unitarian Church) in Providence, Rhode Island was the largest bell cast by the Revere foundry.

=== Bell at First Parish ===
In 1811, First Parish Church of Needham, Massachusetts bought a bell from Revere that has lasted numerous church renovations, rebuildings and movement to a new location. The bell, which weighs 960 pounds, was bought to mark Needham's first centennial, and rings every Sunday and the past two centennials. The bell was purchased for $407.69 and was rung for the first time in November 15, 1811 marking it as the first church bell rung in Needham. First Parish Church of 1836 as painted by Timothy Newell Smith, Jr. in 1863. The tower was added to accommodate the Revere bell.
