= Frances Henley =

American architect (1876–1955)

Frances E. Henley
- Born: 1876; Crompton, Rhode Island, U.S.
- Died: 1955 (aged 78–79); Pawtuxet, Rhode Island, U.S.
- Education: Rhode Island School of Design
- Partner: Nellie Evelyn Livermore (?–1952)

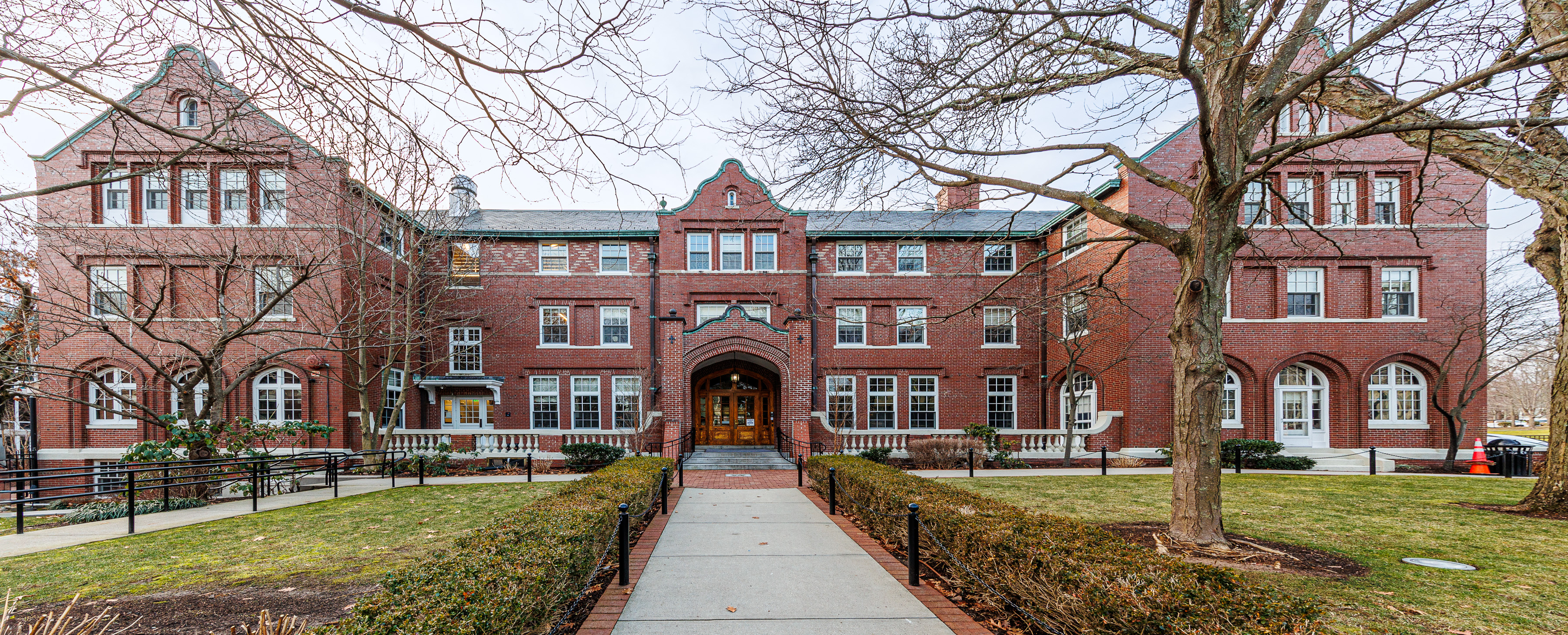
The Hope Building of the Wheeler School in Providence, Rhode Island, designed by Franklin J. Sawtelle and Frances E. Henley and completed by Henley alone in 1913.

Frances E. Henley (1876 – 1955) was an American architect. She was the first woman to study architecture at the Rhode Island School of Design and the first woman to independently practice architecture in Rhode Island.

== Early life and education ==
Frances Evelyn Henley was born in 1876 in Crompton, Rhode Island to Charles A. and Mary E. Booth Henley. She grew up in Providence, Rhode Island. Henley's parents wanted her to become a school teacher. She disagreed and became the first woman to study at the Rhode Island School of Design for architecture. In 1897 she graduated, with honors.

== Career ==
Eliza Greene Metcalf Radeke helped Henley secure employment as a drafter with Howard K. Hilton, though after a few years Henley quit her job with Hilton due to health problems. She pursued architecture as an independent consultant starting in 1904, making her the first female architect in Rhode Island to practice under her own name. She shared office space with Franklin J. Sawtelle, with whom she collaborated on the design of the Wheeler School in Providence. In 1912, after Sawtelle's death, she began working with architect Arthur L. Almy. He died in 1924, and Henley took over his practice, under the agreement should would never marry. Henley designed mainly private residences along the Atlantic coast.

== Architectural works ==
Projects completed by Henley include:

- 1907 — Apartment house, (Note: Demolished.) 83 Franklin St, Providence, Rhode Island
- 1910 — Residence, 59 Ridge Rd, Highland Beach, Warwick, Rhode Island
- 1913 — Wheeler School Hope Building, (Note: Designed in association with Franklin J. Sawtelle and completed by Henley alone after his death.) 216 Hope St, Providence, Rhode Island
- 1927 — Thomas E. O'Donnell residence, (Note: A contributing resource to the Wayland Historic District, NRHP-listed in 2005. Altered.) 196 President Ave, Providence, Rhode Island
- 1934 — Alterations to residence, Diamond Hill, Cumberland, Rhode Island
- 1937 — Alterations to Trinity Episcopal Church, 139 Ocean Ave, Pawtuxet, Cranston, Rhode Island

== Later life and legacy ==
In 1936, she quit her Providence firm and relocated to Pawtuxet in Cranston, Rhode Island. In Pawtuxet she lived with her partner, Nellie Evelyn Livermore, her former assistant. The couple broke up over health problems in 1952. She died in 1955 at home in Pawtuxet.

Henley's papers are held in the collection of the Rhode Island Historical Society.
