= Joseph Balestier =

Joseph Balestier (19 March 1788 – 12 November 1858), was a planter and merchant who was the first United States consul in Rhiau and in Singapore. In 1849, he was appointed Envoy and Diplomatic Agent of the United States to South Eastern Asia.

== Early life ==
Born in Saint-Pierre, Martinique, Balestier first arrived in the United states in 1798 and was naturalized as a citizen in March 1809.

== Career ==
Balestier was appointed Consul in Rhiau, and left from Philadelphia 27 December 1833 on the ship Arno with his wife Maria Revere and their son Joseph Warren Revere Balestier, arriving in Singapore on 16 May 1834. Although he was the Consul to Rhio, he resided in Singapore and became the US Consul to Singapore in 1836 once American ships were given equal trading rights with the East India Company. In Singapore, he had a large house on a 1,000 acre sugar-cane and cotton plantation, with a plant to manufacture sugar and rum. He served until 1852, although he actually left the country due to ill-health on 7 May 1848, leaving Joseph Harvey Weed as acting US Consul.

Balestier returned to Asia in 1850 for the U.S. Diplomatic mission of Amity and Commerce. The USS Plymouth left Macao on 21 February, 1850, and made stops at Cochin-China, February 1850; Bangkok, 24 March; Pulau Subi, 19 May; Kuching, Sarawak, 27 May; Brunei, 23 June; and finally Labuan, 26 June. At Labuan Balestier negotiated a treaty with Brunei, which was ratified by the US Senate on 23 June 1852.

== Personal life ==
Joseph Balestier was a friend of James Brooke, Rajah of Sarawak, from his visit to Singapore in 1839, and wrote an article supporting him when opposition arose in America.

Balestier married Maria Revere (1785–1847), daughter of Paul Revere, in Boston, Massachusetts in 1814. Maria donated the Revere Bell to St. Andrew's Church in Singapore in 1843.

He died in York, Pennsylvania.

== Legacy ==
The area of Balestier in Singapore is named after him and is the site of his sugar plantation.

Art Stage Singapore and the Embassy of the United States, Singapore jointly organize the Joseph Balestier Award for the Freedom of Art to honor an artist or curator from the Southeast Asian region who is actively committed to the ideals of liberty and freedom of expression, and through his or her work, continually seeks to express these ideals.
