= Graham White (priest) =

English priest (1884–1945)

Graham White, OBE, MA (1884 - 8 May 1945) was Archdeacon of Singapore from 1931 until 1945.

White was educated at Winchester and University College, Oxford; and ordained in 1908. He held curacies in South Shields, Staindrop and West Hartlepool after which he was a Chaplain to the Forces during the First World War. He was Vicar of Dawdon from 1920 to 1925 when he went to be the Chaplain at Ipoh.

He died on 8 May 1945. His grave is located at the side of St. Andrew's Cathedral. (Near Padang)

Graham White Drive, which is located off Jalan Toa Payoh near the Pan Island Expressway within St. Andrew's Village, is named after him.
