= Olney Street–Alumni Avenue Historic District =

Historic district in Rhode Island, United States

- U.S. National Register of Historic Places
- U.S. Historic district
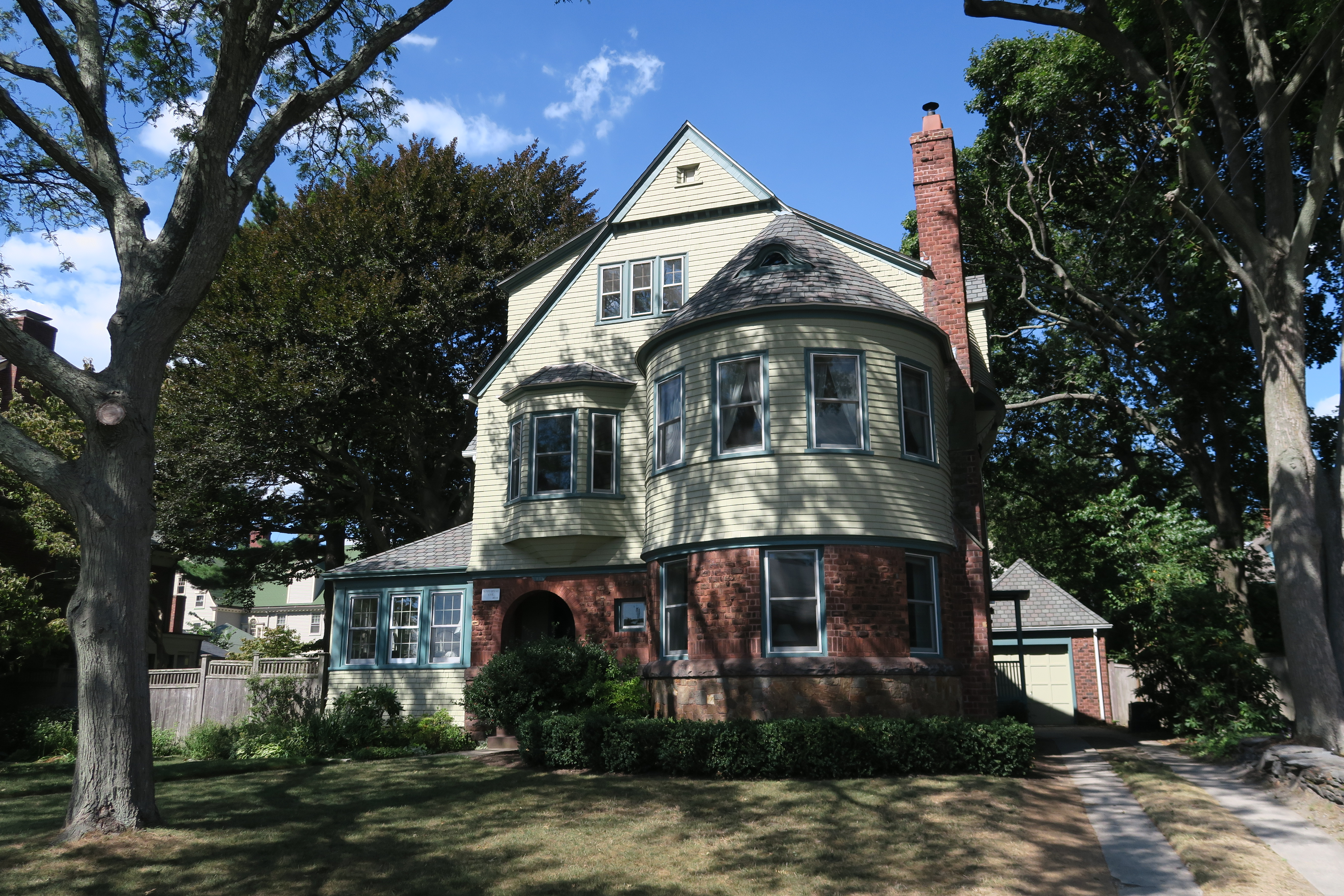
- Nichols-Metcalf House

- Location within Rhode Island Location within the United States
- Location: Providence, Rhode Island
- Coordinates: 41°50′09″N 71°23′53″W
- Architectural style: Colonial Revival, Queen Anne
- NRHP reference No.: 89000333
- Added to NRHP: May 11, 1989

Olney Street–Alumni Avenue Historic District is a residential historic district in northeastern Providence, Rhode Island. Located just north of the Moses Brown School campus, this is an enclave of 53 tasteful yet conservative houses built between about 1880 and 1938. It includes houses along Olney Street and Alumni Avenue between Hope and Arlington Streets, and includes a few houses on adjacent streets. Most of these houses are uniformly set back from the street, even though there was no zoning requiring that at the time, and are of brick and/or wood construction. They are stylistically heterogeneous, with Queen Anne and the Colonial Revival predominating.

The district was listed on the National Register of Historic Places in 1989.

== See also ==
- National Register of Historic Places listings in Providence, Rhode Island
