= Apollos Rivoire =

French-American Huguenot silversmith

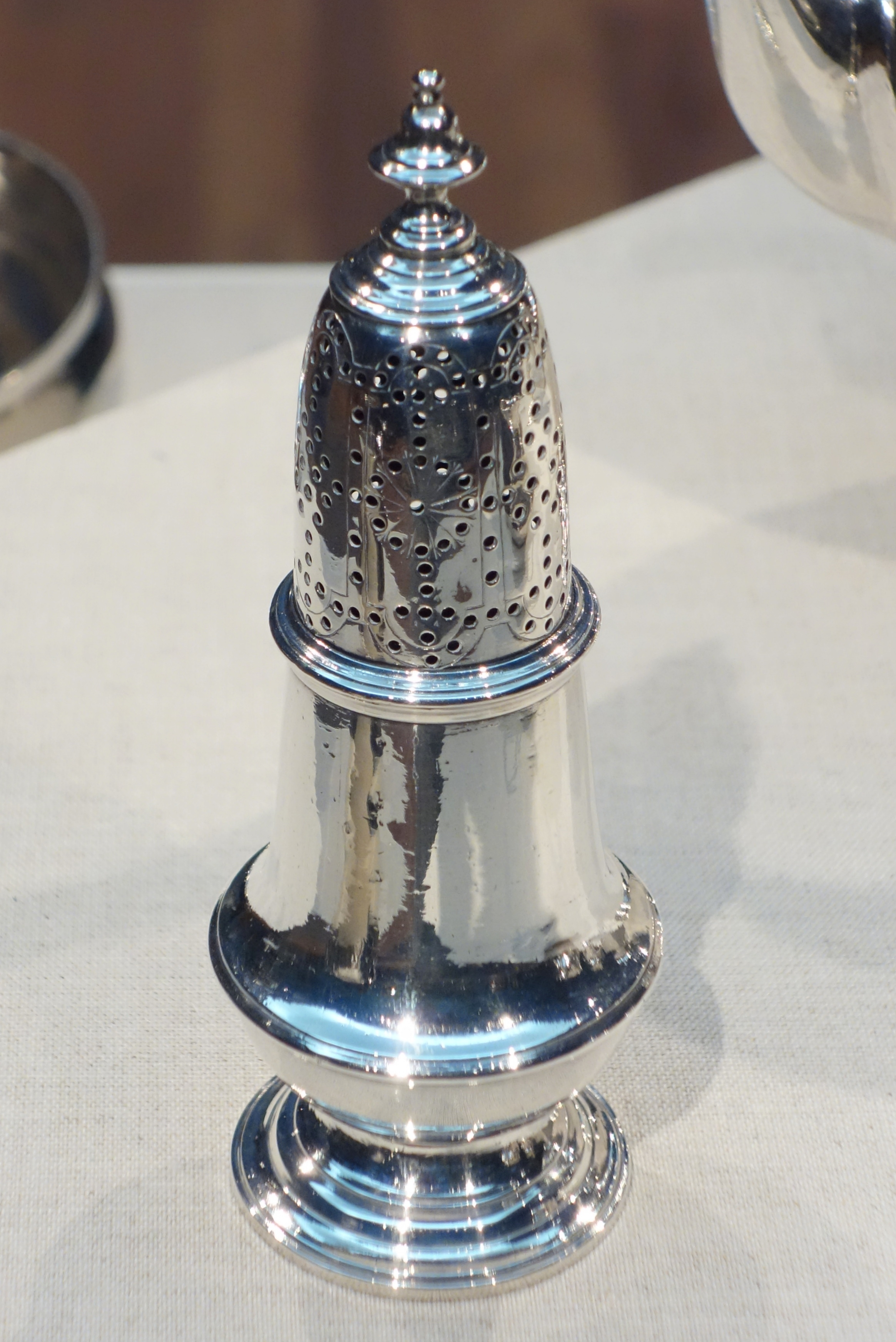
- Caster by Apollos Rivoire, 1740-1750
- Born: November 30, 1702; Riocaud, France
- Died: July 22, 1754 (aged 51); Boston, Massachusetts, U.S.
- Other name: Paul Revere I
- Occupation: Silversmith
- Spouse: Deborah Hitchbourn (m. 1729)
- Children: 12, including Paul Revere

Apollos Rivoire (November 30, 1702 - July 22, 1754), often known as Paul Revere I, was a French-American Huguenot silversmith, active in Boston. He was father to Paul Revere, the famous American silversmith and patriot.

== Biography ==
Rivoire was born in Riocaud, Guyenne, France, and on November 21, 1715, emigrated to his uncle Simon's house on the Isle of Guernsey. This was recorded in a family bible: "Apollos Rivoire, or son, was born the thirtieth of November, 1702, about ten o'clock at night and was baptized at Riancaud, France, Apollos Rivoire, my brother was his Godfather and Anne Maulmon my sister-in-law his Godmother. He set out for Guernsey on the 21st of November, 1715." While there he was apprenticed to his uncle, who soon afterward sent the boy to Boston with instructions to his correspondents to have him learn the goldsmith's trade.

Rivoire arrived in Boston about 1715 and was apprenticed about 1720 to John Coney. By the time Coney died in 1722, he had anglicized his name to Paul Revere. After Coney's death, Rivoire bought his freedom for about £40; the estate's inventory records "Paul Rivoire's Time abt Three Year & half as pr indenture £30/0/0," with an additional record reading "Cash received for Paul Rivoire's Time, more than it was prized at, £10." In 1723 he briefly revisited Guernsey, but returned to Boston and established himself as a gold and silversmith. At that time, his family name was variously spelled, "Reverie" and "Revear" being common. He married Deborah Hitchbourn on June 19, 1729, and with her ultimately had 11 children, of whom Paul Revere was the second. He advertised his shop location in The Boston Weekly News-Letter, May 21, 1730: "Paul Revere, Goldsmith is removed from Capt. Pitts at the Town Dock to North End over against Col. Hutchinson."

His work is collected in the Museum of Fine Arts, Boston, De Young Museum, and Hood Museum of Art.
