= Paul Revere =

American silversmith and military officer (1735–1818)

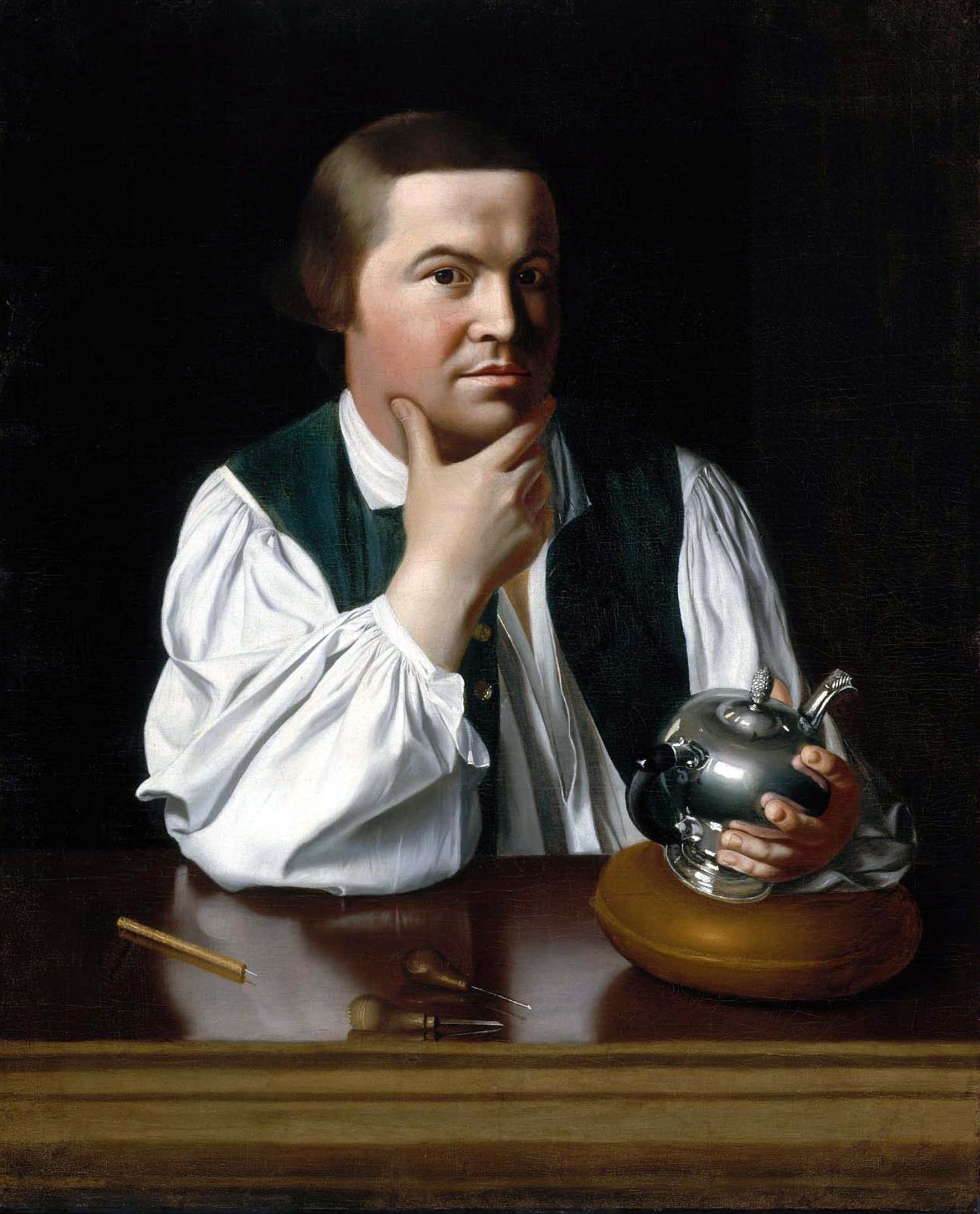
- Portrait of Paul Revere by John Singleton Copley, 1768
- Born: January 1, 1735 (O.S.: December 21, 1734); North End, Boston, Massachusetts Bay, British America
- Died: May 10, 1818 (aged 83); Boston, Massachusetts, U.S.
- Occupations: Silversmith, colonial militia officer
- Political party: Federalist
- Spouses: Sarah Orne (m. 1757; died 1773); Rachel Walker (m. 1773; died 1813)
- Children: 8 with Sarah Orne; 8 with Rachel Walker; including Joseph
- Parents: Apollos Rivoire (father); Deborah Hitchbourn (mother)

Paul Revere (December 21, 1734 O.S. (January 1, 1735 N.S.) (Note: Revere's date of birth is confused by the conversion between the Julian and Gregorian calendars, which offsets the date by 11 days. Until 2019, historians did not know his actual birth date, only his baptismal date of December 22, 1734.) – May 10, 1818) was an American silversmith, military officer and industrialist who played a major role during the opening months of the American Revolutionary War in Massachusetts, engaging in a midnight ride in 1775 to alert nearby minutemen of the approach of British troops prior to the battles of Lexington and Concord.

Born in the North End of Boston, Revere eventually became a prosperous and prominent Bostonian, deriving his income from silversmithing and engraving. During the American Revolution, he was a strong supporter of the Patriot cause and joined the Sons of Liberty. His midnight ride transformed him into an American folk hero, being dramatized in Henry Wadsworth Longfellow's 1861 poem "Paul Revere's Ride". He also helped to organize an intelligence and alarm system to keep watch on the movements of British forces. Revere later served as an officer in the Massachusetts Militia, though his service ended after the Penobscot Expedition, one of the most disastrous American campaigns of the American Revolutionary War, for which he was absolved of blame.

Following the war, Revere returned to his silversmith trade. He used the profits from his expanding business to finance his work in iron casting, bronze bell and cannon casting, and the forging of copper bolts and spikes. In 1800, he became the first American to successfully roll copper into sheets for use as sheathing on naval vessels.

== Early life and education ==
Revere was born in the North End, Boston, on December 21, 1734, according to the Old Style calendar then in use, or January 1, 1735, in the modern calendar. His father, Apollos Rivoire, a French Huguenot who came to Boston at the age of 13, had been apprenticed to the silversmith John Coney. By the time he married Deborah Hitchborn, a member of a long-standing Boston family that owned a small shipping wharf, in 1729, Rivoire had anglicized his name to Paul Revere. The Hitchborn family was of English origin; Deborah's maternal great-grandparents, David and Catherine Hitchbourn, arrived in Boston, Massachusetts, in 1641 from Boston, England. Their son, Paul Revere, was the third of 12 children and eventually the eldest surviving son. Revere grew up in the environment of the extended Hitchborn family, and never learned his father's native language.

At the age of thirteen, Revere finished his classroom schooling and became an apprentice to his father. Silversmithing afforded young Paul connections with a cross-section of Boston society; these would serve him well when he became active in the American Revolution.

In 1750, aged 15, Revere was part of the first group of change ringers to ring the new bells (cast in 1744) at Christ Church, in the north of Boston (the Old North Church). Revere eventually began attending the services of the political and provocative Jonathan Mayhew at the West Church. His father, who had raised him in the Calvinist New Brick Church, did not approve. Family tradition states he beat him for his disobedience on one occasion. Revere relented and returned to his father's church, although he did become friends with Mayhew, and returned to the West Church in the late 1760s.

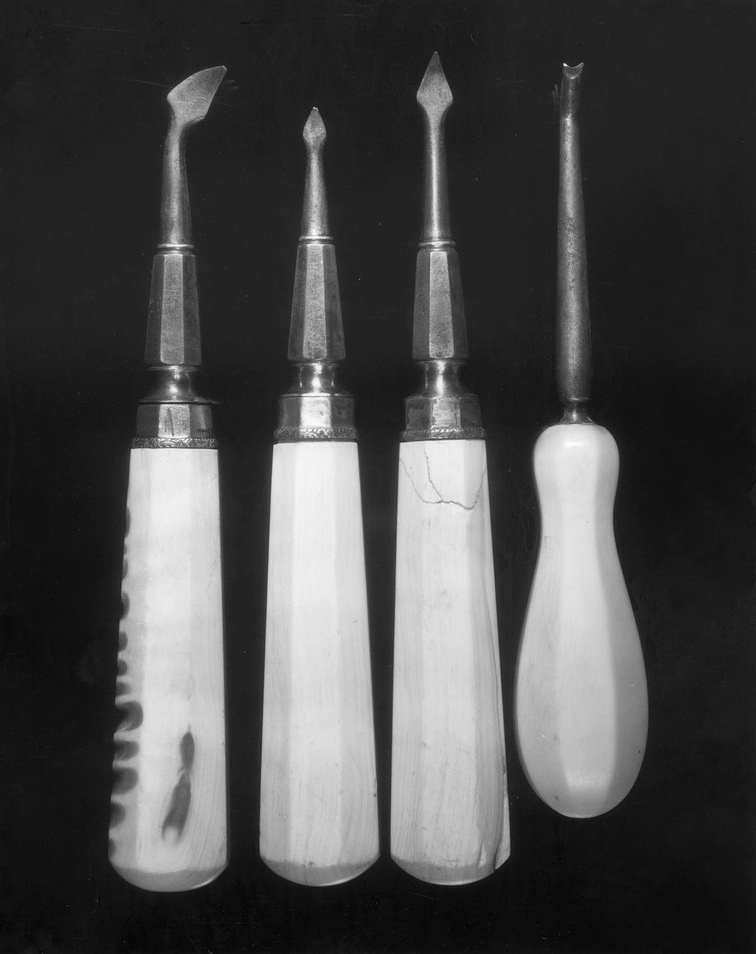
Revere's dentistry tools

Revere's father died in 1754, when Paul was legally too young to officially be the master of the family silver shop. In February 1756, during the French and Indian War (the North American theater of the Seven Years' War), he enlisted in the provincial army. He may have made this decision because of the weak economy, since army service promised consistent pay. Commissioned a second lieutenant in a provincial artillery regiment, he spent the summer at Fort William Henry at the southern end of Lake George in New York as part of an abortive plan for the capture of Fort St. Frédéric. He did not stay long in the army, but returned to Boston and assumed control of the silver shop in his own name. On August 4, 1757, he married Sarah Orne (1736–1773); their first child was born eight months later. He and Sarah had eight children, but two died young.

== 1765–1774: the gathering storm of revolution ==
Revere's business began to suffer when the British economy entered a recession in the years following the Seven Years' War, and declined further when the Stamp Act of 1765 resulted in a further downturn in the Massachusetts economy. Business was so poor that an attempt was made to seize his property in late 1765. To help make ends meet he even took up dentistry. One client was Joseph Warren, a local physician and political opposition leader with whom Revere formed a close friendship. Revere and Warren, in addition to having common political views, were also both active in the same local Masonic lodges. In 1765, a group of militants who would become known as the Sons of Liberty formed, of which Revere was a member.

From 1765 on, in support of the dissident cause, he produced engravings with political themes. Probably most famous is his depiction of the March 1770 Boston Massacre (see illustration), engraved by Revere from Henry Pelham's drawing without permission. It was colored by a third man and printed by a fourth but none was credited. It stated "Engraved, Printed, & Sold by Paul Revere Boston". On March 29, 1770, Pelham wrote "When I heard that you was cutting a plate...I thought it impossible, as I knew you was not capable of doing it unless you coppied it from mine..." He said he thought his drawing entrusted to someone honourable who wouldn't take undue advantage. Further, he felt himself robbed "as truly as if you had plundered me on the highway". His letter to Revere ended with the hope that the World would be aware of Revere's dishonourable actions.

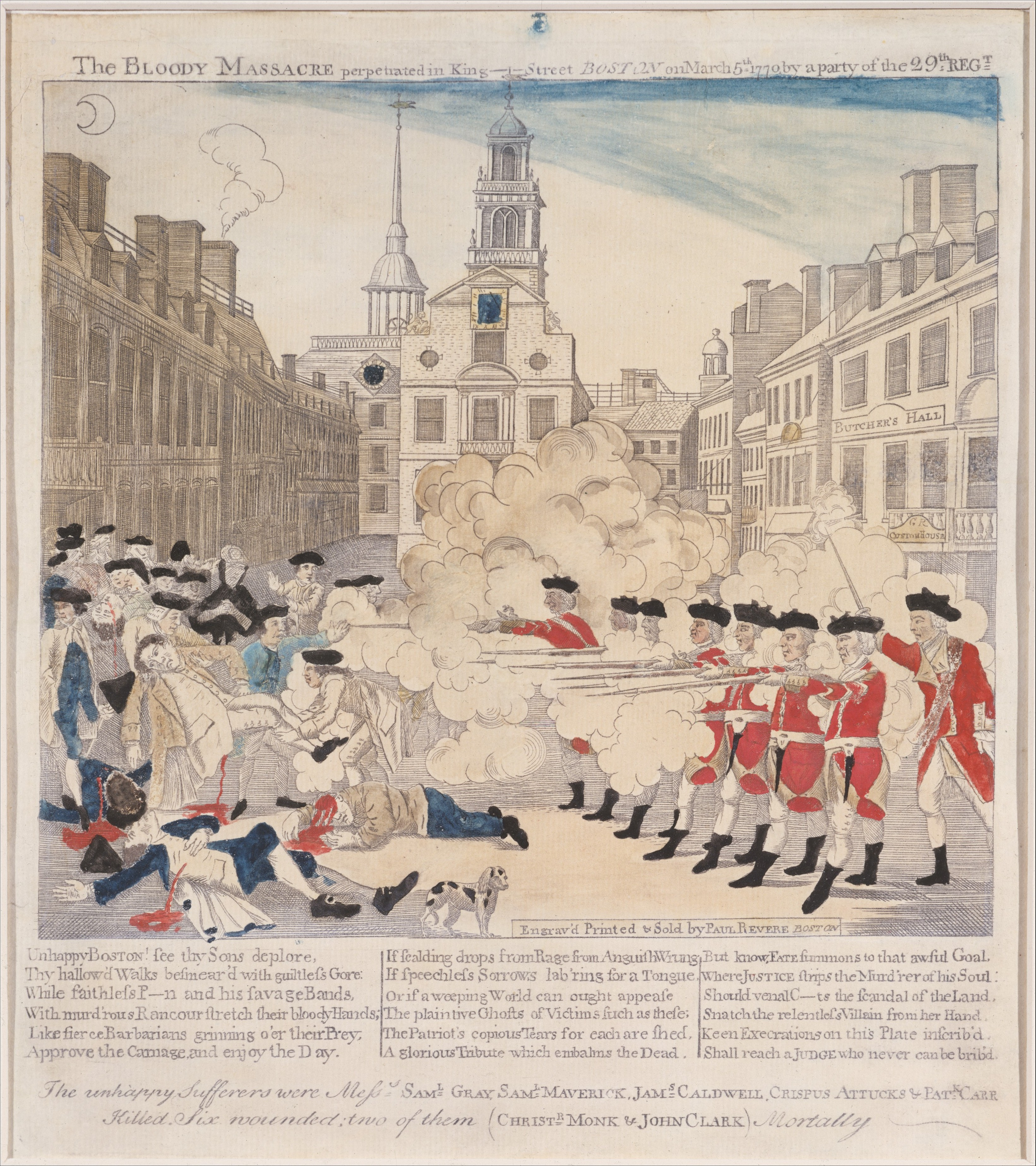
The Bloody Massacre Perpetrated in King Street Boston on March 5, 1770, a copper engraving by Paul Revere modeled on a drawing by Henry Pelham, 1770.

In 1770 Revere purchased a house, now a museum on North Square in Boston's North End. The house provided space for his growing family while he continued to maintain his shop at nearby Clark's Wharf. Sarah died in 1773, and on October 10 of that year, Revere married Rachel Walker (1745–1813). They had eight children, three of whom died young.

In November 1773 the merchant ship Dartmouth arrived in Boston harbor carrying the first shipment of tea made under the terms of the Tea Act. This act authorized the British East India Company to ship tea (of which it had huge surpluses due to colonial boycotts organized in response to the Townshend Acts) directly to the colonies, bypassing colonial merchants. Passage of the act prompted calls for renewed protests against the tea shipments, on which Townshend duties were still levied. Revere and Warren, as members of the informal North End Caucus, organized a watch over the Dartmouth to prevent the unloading of the tea. Revere is widely credited with being a participant and possibly a leader in the Boston Tea Party of December 16, when colonists dumped tea from the Dartmouth and two other ships into the harbor.

From December 1773 to November 1775, Revere served as a courier for the Boston Committee of Public Safety, traveling to New York and Philadelphia to report on the political unrest in Boston. Research has documented 18 such rides. Notice of some of them was published in Massachusetts newspapers, and British authorities received further intelligence of them from Loyalist Americans. In 1774, his cousin John on the island of Guernsey wrote to Paul that John had seen reports of Paul's role as an "express" (courier) in London newspapers.

In 1774, the military governor of Massachusetts, General Thomas Gage, dissolved the provincial assembly on orders from Great Britain. Governor Gage also closed the port of Boston and all over the city forced private citizens to quarter (provide lodging for) soldiers in their homes. (Note: Forcing private citizens to quarter soldiers in their homes would be one of the grievances enumerated in the United States Declaration of Independence—[The King] "has combined with others to subject us to a Jurisdiction foreign to our Constitution, and unacknowledged by our Laws; giving his Assent to their Acts of pretended Legislation: For quartering large Bodies of Armed Troops among us:..."—and the framers of the United States Constitution restricted the practice in the Third Amendment of the Bill of Rights.)

During this time, Revere and a group of about 30 other tradesmen began meeting in secret at his favorite haunt, the Green Dragon, to coordinate the gathering and dissemination of intelligence by "watching the Movements of British Soldiers". Around this time Revere regularly contributed politically charged engravings to the recently founded Patriot monthly, Royal American Magazine.

He rode to Portsmouth, New Hampshire, in December 1774 upon rumors of an impending landing of British troops there, a journey known in history as the Portsmouth Alarm. Although the rumors were false, his ride sparked a rebel success by provoking locals to raid Fort William and Mary, defended by just six soldiers, for its gunpowder supply.

== Midnight Ride ==
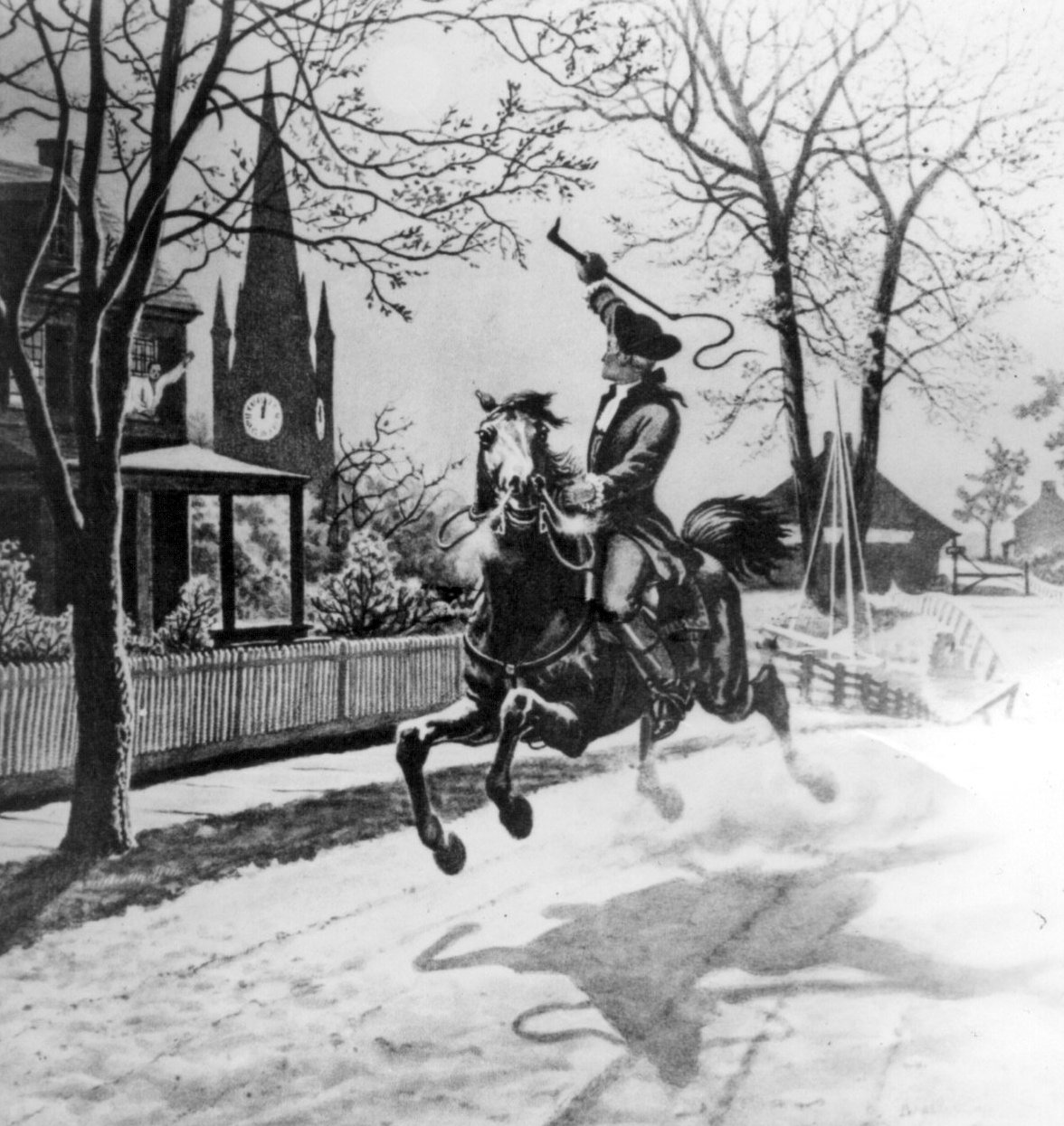
A 20th-century depiction of Revere's ride

Paul Revere's midnight ride was an alert given to minutemen in the Province of Massachusetts Bay by local Patriots on the night of April 18, 1775, warning them of the approach of British Army troops prior to the battles of Lexington and Concord. In the preceding weeks, Patriots in the region learned of a planned crackdown on the Massachusetts Provincial Congress, then based in Concord, by the British authorities in the colony.

Sons of Liberty members Paul Revere and William Dawes prepared the alert, which began when Robert Newman, the sexton of Boston's Old North Church, used a lantern signal to warn colonists in Charlestown of the British Army's advance by way of the Charles River. Revere and Dawes then rode to meet John Hancock and Samuel Adams in Lexington, ten miles (16 km) away, alerting up to 40 other Patriot riders along the way. Revere and Dawes then headed towards Concord with Samuel Prescott.

The trio were intercepted by a British Army patrol in Lincoln. Prescott and Dawes escaped but Revere was returned to Lexington by the patrol and freed after questioning. By giving the minutemen advance warning of the British Army's actions, the ride played a crucial role in the Patriot victory in the subsequent battles at Lexington and Concord. The ride has been commemorated in a range of cultural depictions, most notably Henry Wadsworth Longfellow's 1861 poem, "Paul Revere's Ride", which has shaped popular memory of the event, despite its factual inaccuracies.

== War years ==
Because Boston was besieged after the battles of Lexington and Concord, Revere could not return to the city, which was now firmly in British hands. He boarded in Watertown, where he was eventually joined by Rachel and most of his children (Paul Jr., then 15, remained in Boston to mind the family properties). After he was denied a commission in the Continental Army, he tried to find other ways to be useful to the rebel cause. He was retained by the provincial congress as a courier, and he printed local currency which the congress used to pay the troops around Boston.

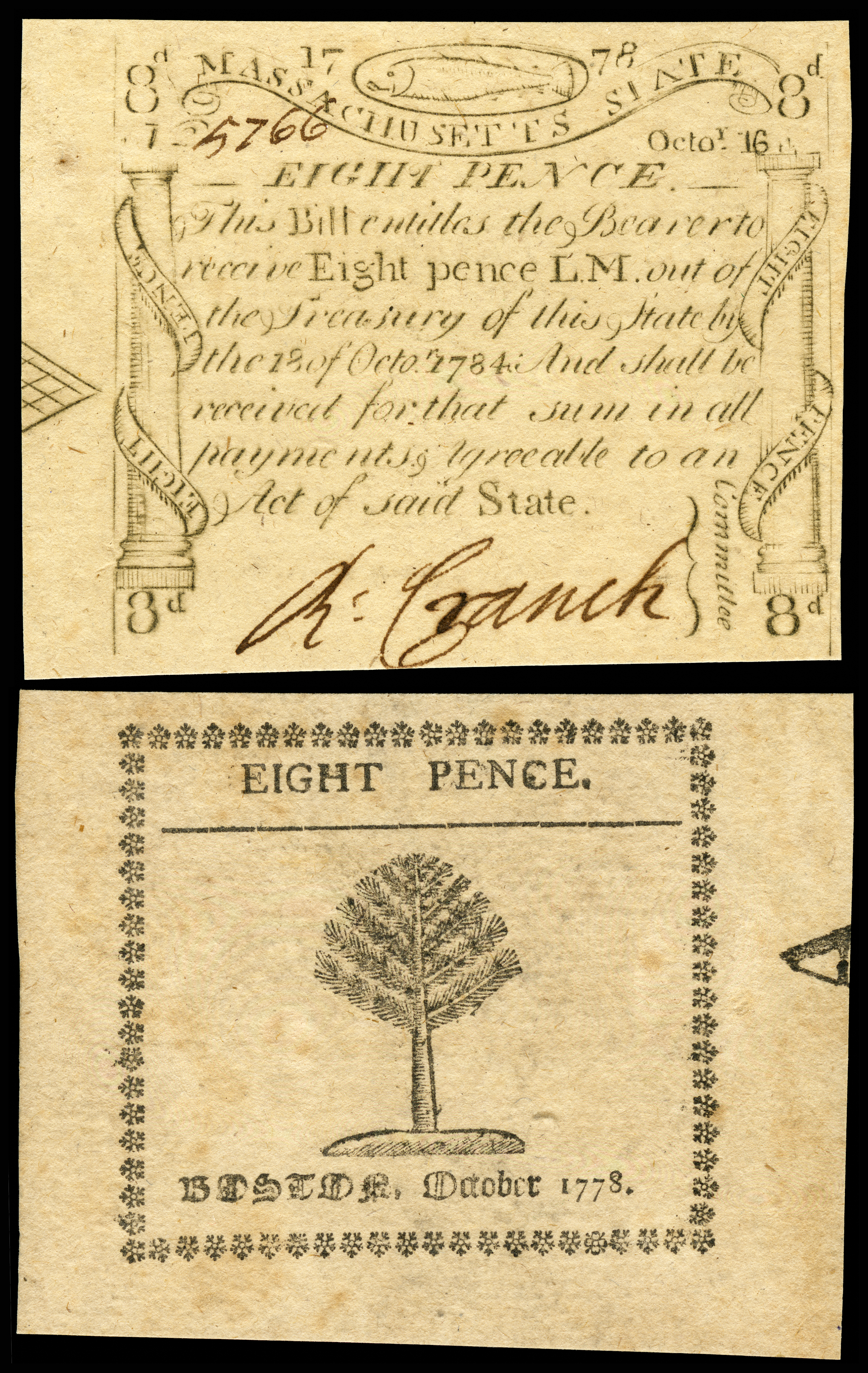
An eight-pence bill engraved and printed by Revere in 1778. The engraving of the pine tree on the verso (back of the bill) is likely the work of silversmith and engraver Nathaniel Hurd.

Since there was a desperate shortage of gunpowder, the provincial congress decided in November 1775 to send him to Philadelphia to study the working of the only powder mill in the colonies, in the hopes that he might be able to build a second one in Massachusetts. Revere called on the mill's owner, Oswald Eve, armed with a letter from Continental Congressmen Robert Morris and John Dickinson asking Eve to "Chearfully & from Public Spirited Motives give Mr. Revere such information as will inable him to Conduct the business on his return home." Eve showed Revere around the mill, but refused to give him detailed drawings unless he was first paid a substantial bribe. Despite this chilly reception, Revere was able to discern useful information from the visit. He also acquired, through the work of Samuel Adams, plans for another powder mill. This information enabled Revere to set up a powder mill at Stoughton (present-day Canton). The mill produced tons of gunpowder for the Patriot cause.

Revere's friend and compatriot Joseph Warren was killed in the Battle of Bunker Hill on June 17, 1775. Because soldiers killed in battle were often buried in mass graves without ceremony, Warren's grave was unmarked. On March 21, 1776, several days after the British army left Boston, Revere, Warren's brothers, and a few friends went to the battlefield and found a grave containing two bodies. After being buried for nine months, Warren's face was unrecognizable, but Revere was able to identify Warren's body because he had placed a false tooth in Warren's mouth, and recognized the wire he had used for fastening it. Warren was given a proper funeral and reburied in a marked grave.

=== Militia service ===
Upon returning to Boston in 1776, Revere was commissioned a major of infantry in the Massachusetts militia in that April, and transferred to the artillery a month later. In November he was promoted to lieutenant colonel, and was stationed at Castle William, defending Boston harbor. He was generally second or third in the chain of command, and on several occasions he was given command of the fort. He applied his engineering skills to maintaining the fort's armaments, even designing and building a caliper to accurately measure cannonballs and cannon bore holes. The service at Castle William was relatively isolated, and personality friction prompted some men to file complaints against Revere. The boredom was alleviated in late August 1777 when Revere was sent with a troop of soldiers to escort prisoners taken in the Battle of Bennington to Boston, where they were confined on board prison ships, and again in September when he was briefly deployed to Rhode Island.

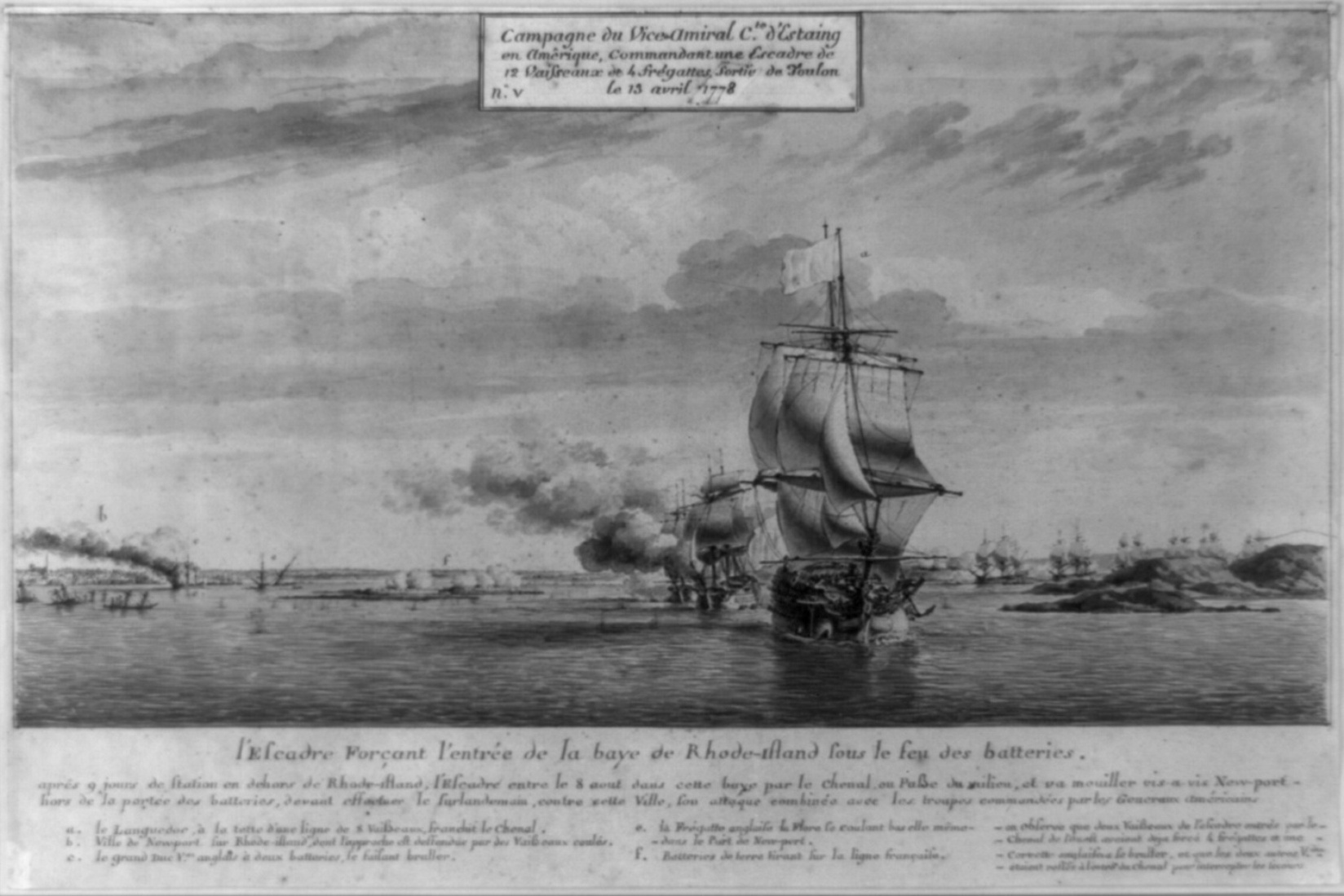
Drawing depicting the arrival of the French fleet in Narragansett Bay in 1778

In August 1778 Revere's regiment served in a combined Franco-American expedition whose objective was to capture the British base at Newport, Rhode Island. His regiment was responsible for erecting and maintaining artillery batteries on Aquidneck Island. The attempt was abandoned by the French when their fleet was scattered in a storm, and Revere's regiment returned to Boston before the British sortied from Newport to force the Battle of Rhode Island.

=== Penobscot disaster ===
The British in June 1779 established a new base on Penobscot Bay in present-day Maine (which was then part of Massachusetts). Massachusetts authorities called out the militia, pressed into service available shipping, and organized a major expedition to dislodge the British. The expedition was a complete fiasco: its land and naval commanders squabbled over control of the expedition, and could not agree on strategy or tactics. The arrival of British reinforcements led to the destruction of the entire Massachusetts fleet. Revere commanded the artillery units for the expedition, and was responsible for organizing the artillery train. He participated in the taking of Bank's Island, from which artillery batteries could reach the British ships anchored before Fort George. He next oversaw the transport of the guns from Bank's Island to a new position on the heights of the Bagaduce Peninsula that commanded the fort. Although Revere was in favor of storming the fort, Brigadier General Solomon Lovell opted for a siege instead. After further disagreements on how to proceed between Lovell and fleet commander Dudley Saltonstall, Lovell decided to return to the transports on August 12, a decision supported by Revere.

Late the next day British sails were spotted. A mad scramble ensued, and on the 14th the fleet was in retreat heading up the Penobscot River. Revere and his men were put ashore with their stores, and their transports destroyed. At one point Brigadier General Peleg Wadsworth ordered Revere to send his barge in an attempt to recover a ship drifting toward the enemy position. Revere at first resisted, but eventually complied, and Wadsworth told him to expect formal charges over the affair. The incident separated Revere from his men. Moving overland, he eventually managed to regroup most of his troops, and returned to Boston on August 26. A variety of charges were made against Revere, some of which were exaggerated assignments of blame made by enemies he had made in his command at Castle William. The initial hearings on the matter in September 1779 were inconclusive, but he was asked to resign his post. He repeatedly sought a full court-martial to clear his name, but it was not until February 1782 that a court martial heard the issue, exonerating him.

=== Business and social connections ===
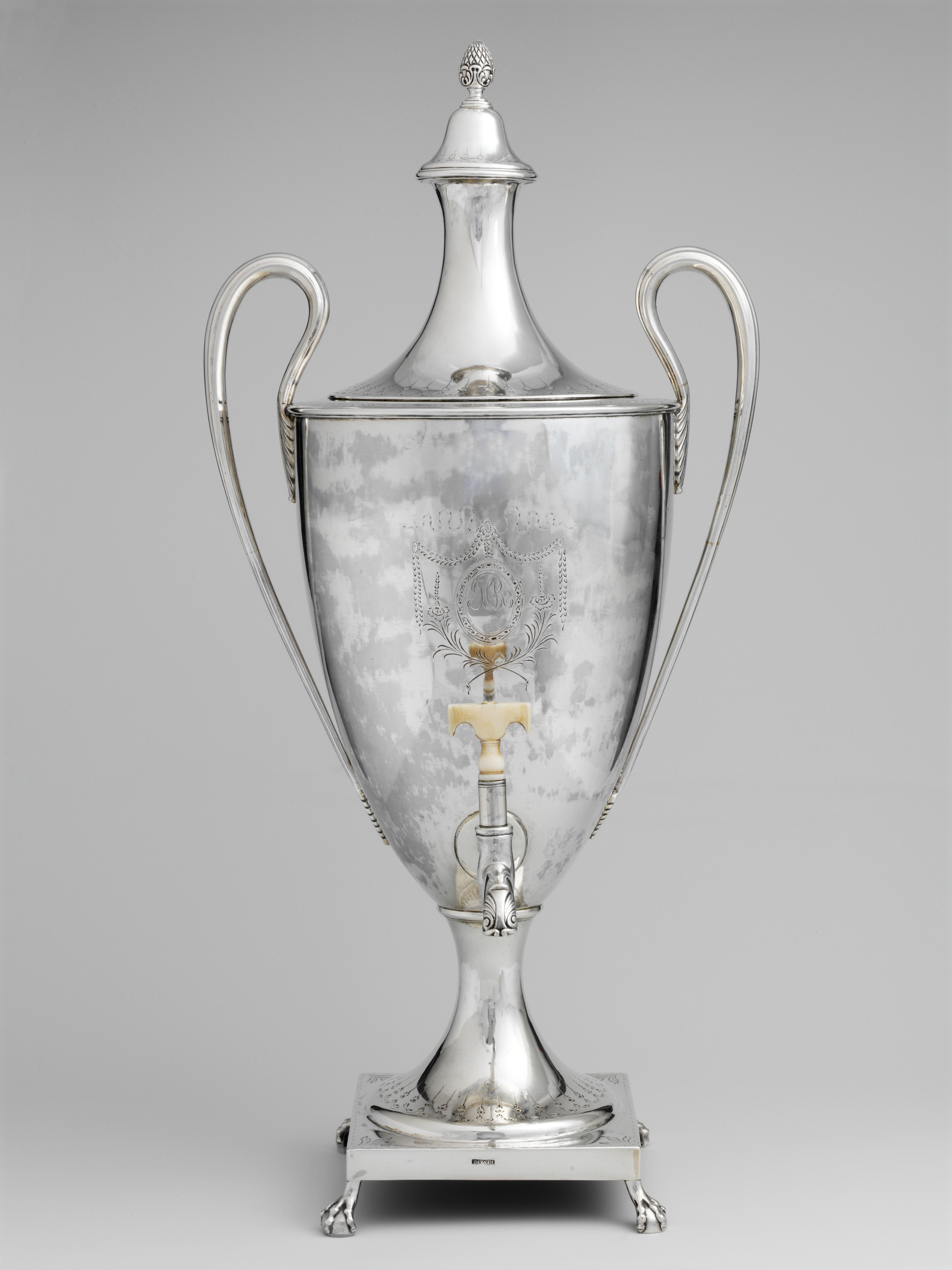
Tea urn for Hannah Rowe, 1791, Metropolitan Museum of Art.

During the Revolutionary War, Revere continued his efforts to move upwards in society into the gentry. After his failed efforts to become a military officer he attempted to become a merchant, but was hindered by a number of factors: while he was a fairly well-off member of the artisan class, he did not have the resources to afford the goods he would have sold as a merchant, nor were lenders in England willing to lend him the required startup capital. Other American merchants of the time were able to continue their business with colleagues in England. However, Revere's inexperience as a merchant meant that he had not yet established such relationships and was not able to communicate as effectively on unfamiliar matters. Another factor preventing Revere's success as a merchant was the economic climate of the time period after the war known as the Confederation Period; while the colonies had seen a time of economic growth before the war, the colonies experienced a severe post-war depression, constraining the overall success of his business.

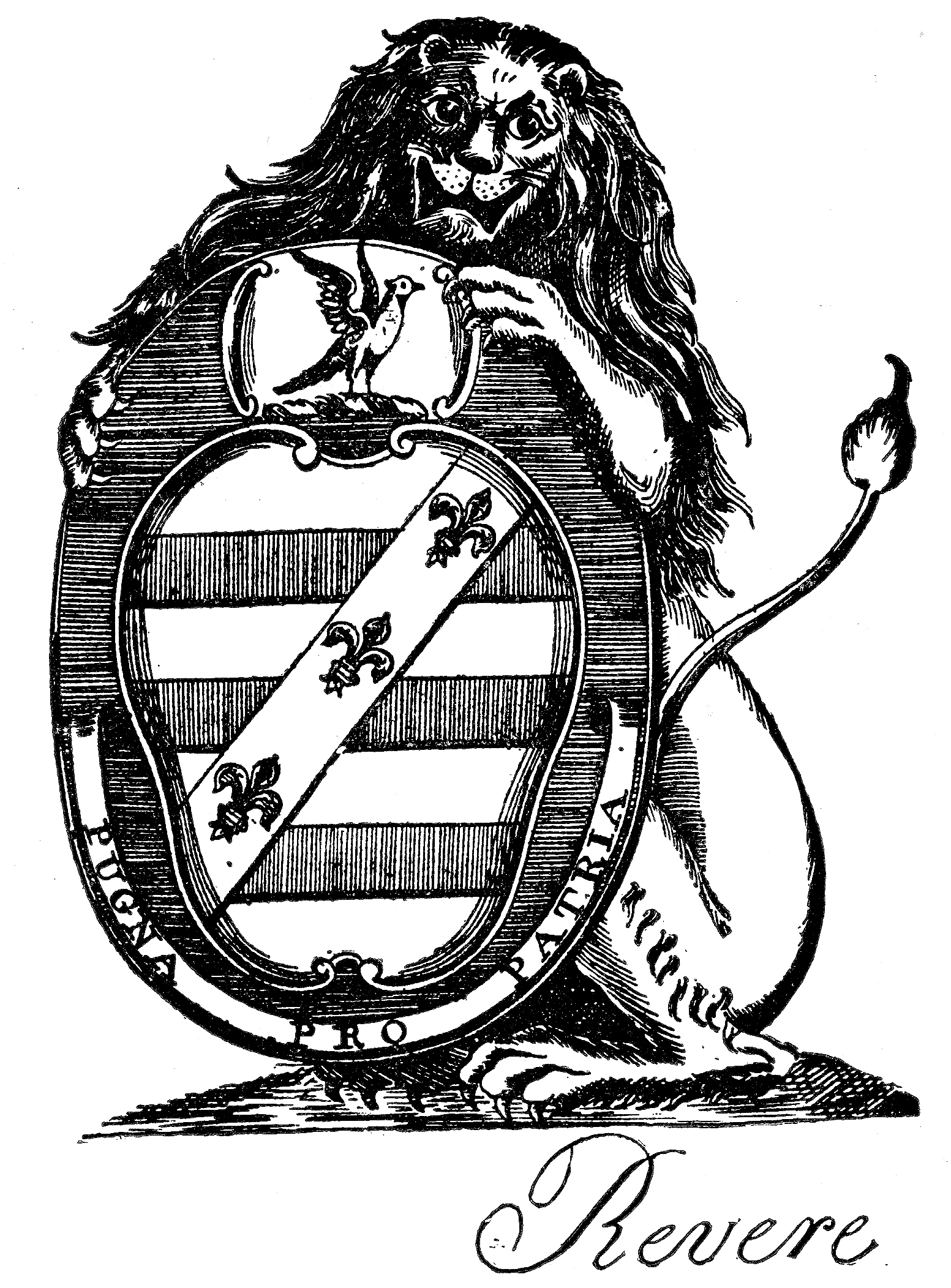
Revere Coat-of-Arms engraved by Paul Revere

While Revere struggled as a merchant, his success as a silversmith enabled him to pursue and leverage more advanced technological developments for the purposes of mass production. For example, rolling mills greatly improved the productivity of his silver shop and enabled his business to move further away from manufacturing high-end customized products in order to focus instead on the production of a more standardized set of goods. In the 18th century, the standard of living continuously improved in America, as genteel goods became increasingly available to the masses. Revere responded particularly well to this trend because his business was not solely manufacturing custom, high end purchases. Smaller products like teaspoons and buckles accounted for the majority of his work, allowing him to build a broad customer base.

Revere's increased efficiency left financial and human resources available for the exploration of other products, which was essential to overcoming the fluctuating post-war economic climate. In addition to increasing production, the flatting mill enabled Revere to move towards a more managerial position.

== Later years: entrepreneurship, manufacturing, and politics ==
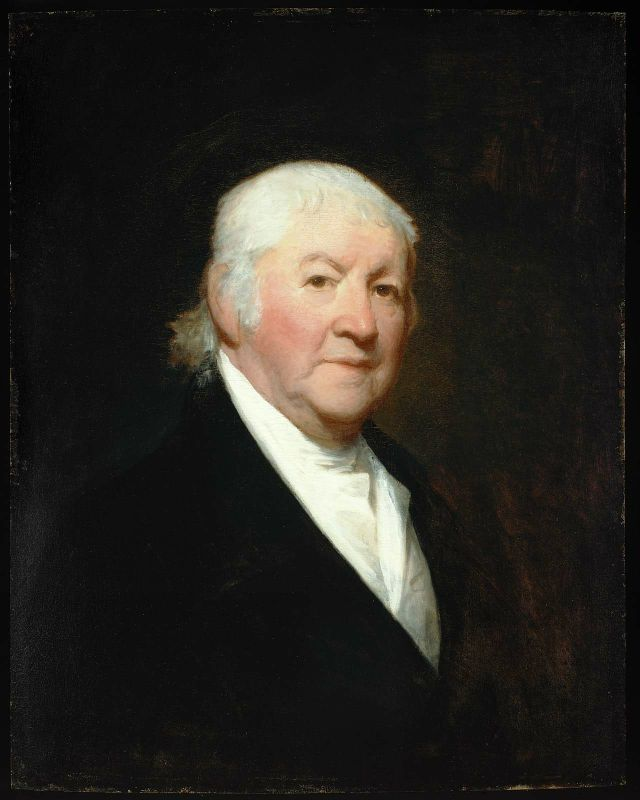
1813 portrait of Revere by Gilbert Stuart

After the war, Revere became interested in metal work beyond gold and silver. By 1788 he had invested some of the profits from his growing silverworking trade to construct a large furnace, which would allow him to work with larger quantities of metals at higher temperatures. He soon opened an iron foundry in Boston's North End that produced utilitarian cast iron items such as stove backs, fireplace tools, and sash-window weights, marketed to a broad segment of Boston's population. Many of Revere's business practices changed when he expanded his practice into ironworking, because he transitioned from just being an artisan to also being an entrepreneur and a manager. In order to make this transition successfully, Revere had to invest substantial quantities of capital and time in his foundry.

=== Technological practices ===
The quasi-industrialization of his practice set Revere apart from his competition. "Revere's rapid foundry success resulted from fortuitous timing, innate technical aptitude, thorough research, and the casting experience he gained from silverworking." This technical proficiency allowed Revere to optimize his work and adapt to a new technological and entrepreneurial model. Revere's location also benefited his endeavors. Revere was entering the field of iron casting in a time when New England cities were becoming centers of industry. The nature of technological advancement was such that many skilled entrepreneurs in a number of fields worked together, in what is known by Nathan Rosenberg as technological convergence, by which a number of companies work together on challenges in order to spur advances. By accessing the knowledge of other nearby metal workers, Revere was able to successfully explore and master new technologies throughout his career.

=== Labor practices ===
One of the biggest changes for Revere in his new business was organization of labor. In his earlier days, Revere primarily utilized the apprenticeship model standard for artisan shops at this time, but as his business expanded he hired employees (wage laborers) to work for his foundry. Many manufacturers of the era found this transition from master to employer difficult because many employees at the onset of the Industrial Revolution identified themselves as skilled workers, and thus wanted to be treated with the respect and autonomy accorded to artisans. An artisan himself, Revere managed to avoid many of these labor conflicts by adopting a system of employment that still held trappings of the craft system in the form of worker freedoms such as work hour flexibility, wages in line with skill levels, and liquor on the job.

=== Manufacturing: church bells, cannon, and copper products ===
After mastering the iron casting process and realizing substantial profits from this new product line, Revere identified a burgeoning market for church bells in the religious revival known as the Second Great Awakening that followed the war. Beginning in 1792 he became one of America's best-known bell casters, working with sons Paul Jr. and Joseph Warren Revere in the firm Paul Revere & Sons. This firm cast the first bell made in Boston and ultimately produced hundreds of bells, a number of which remain in operation.

In 1794, Revere decided to take the next step in the evolution of his business, expanding his bronze casting work by learning to cast cannon for the federal government, state governments, and private clients. Although the government often had trouble paying him on time, its large orders inspired him to deepen his contracting and seek additional product lines of interest to the military.

By 1795, a growing percentage of his foundry's business came from a new product, copper bolts, spikes, and other fittings that he sold to merchants and the Boston naval yard for ship construction. In 1801, Revere became a pioneer in the production of rolled copper, opening North America's first copper mill south of Boston in Canton. Copper from the Revere Copper Company was used to cover the original wooden dome of the Massachusetts State House in 1802. His copper and brass works eventually grew, through sale and corporate merger, into a large corporation, Revere Copper and Brass, Inc.

=== Steps towards standardized production ===
During his earlier days as an artisan, especially when working with silver products, Revere produced "bespoke" or customized goods. As he shifted to ironworking, he found the need to produce more standardized products, because this made production cheaper. To achieve the beginnings of standardization, Revere used identical molds for casting, especially in the fabrication of mass-produced items such as stoves, ovens, frames, and chimney backs. However, Revere did not totally embrace uniform production. For example, his bells and cannons were all unique products: these large objects required extensive fine-tuning and customization, and the small number of bells and cannon minimized the potential benefits of standardizing them. In addition, even the products that he made in large quantities could not be truly standardized due to technological and skill limitations. His products were rarely (if ever) identical, but his processes were well systematized. "He came to realize that the foundry oven melded the characteristics of tools and machines: it required skilled labor and could be used in a flexible manner to produce different products, but an expert could produce consistent output by following a standard set of production practices."

=== Freemasonry ===
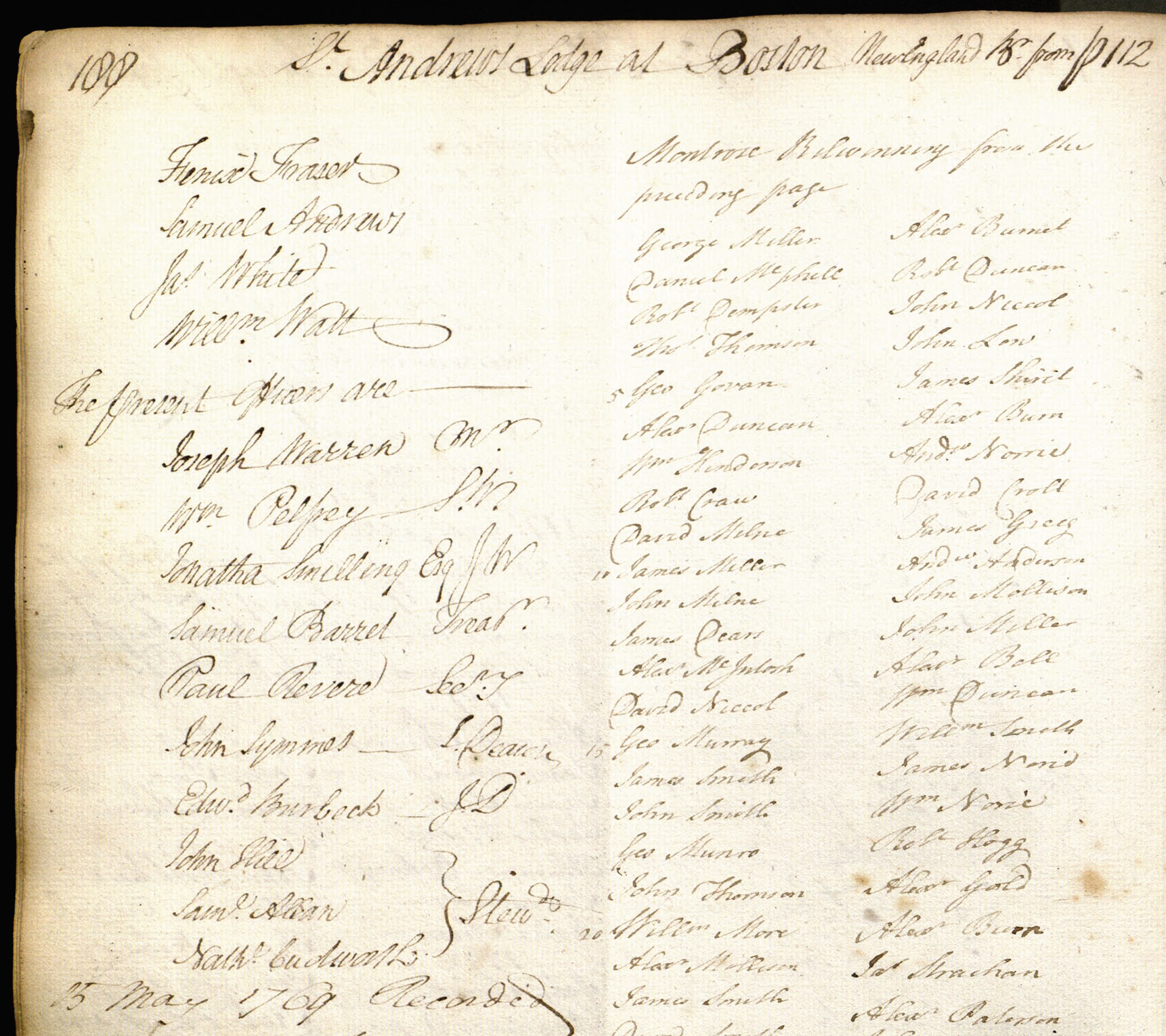
Extract from membership register for Revere, Warren and Palfrey

Revere was a Freemason as a member of Lodge St. Andrews, No. 81, in Boston, Massachusetts. The Lodge continues to meet in Boston with the No. 4 under the jurisdiction of the Grand Lodge of Massachusetts. The date he joined the Lodge is not known but was sometime after its inauguration on St Andrew's Day, November 30, 1756, and before May 15, 1769, when he is recorded in the Grand Lodge of Scotland membership register as the Lodge Secretary. Joseph Warren and William Palfrey are also recorded, on the same page, as members of the Lodge as being Master and Senior Warden respectively (see image).

He subsequently became the Grand Master of the Freemasons of Massachusetts from 1795 to 1797. During his tenure, Revere, along with Governor Samuel Adams and Deputy Grand Master Colonel William Scollay, deposited a box containing an assemblage of commemorative items under the cornerstone of the Massachusetts State House on July 4, 1795.

=== Politics and final years ===
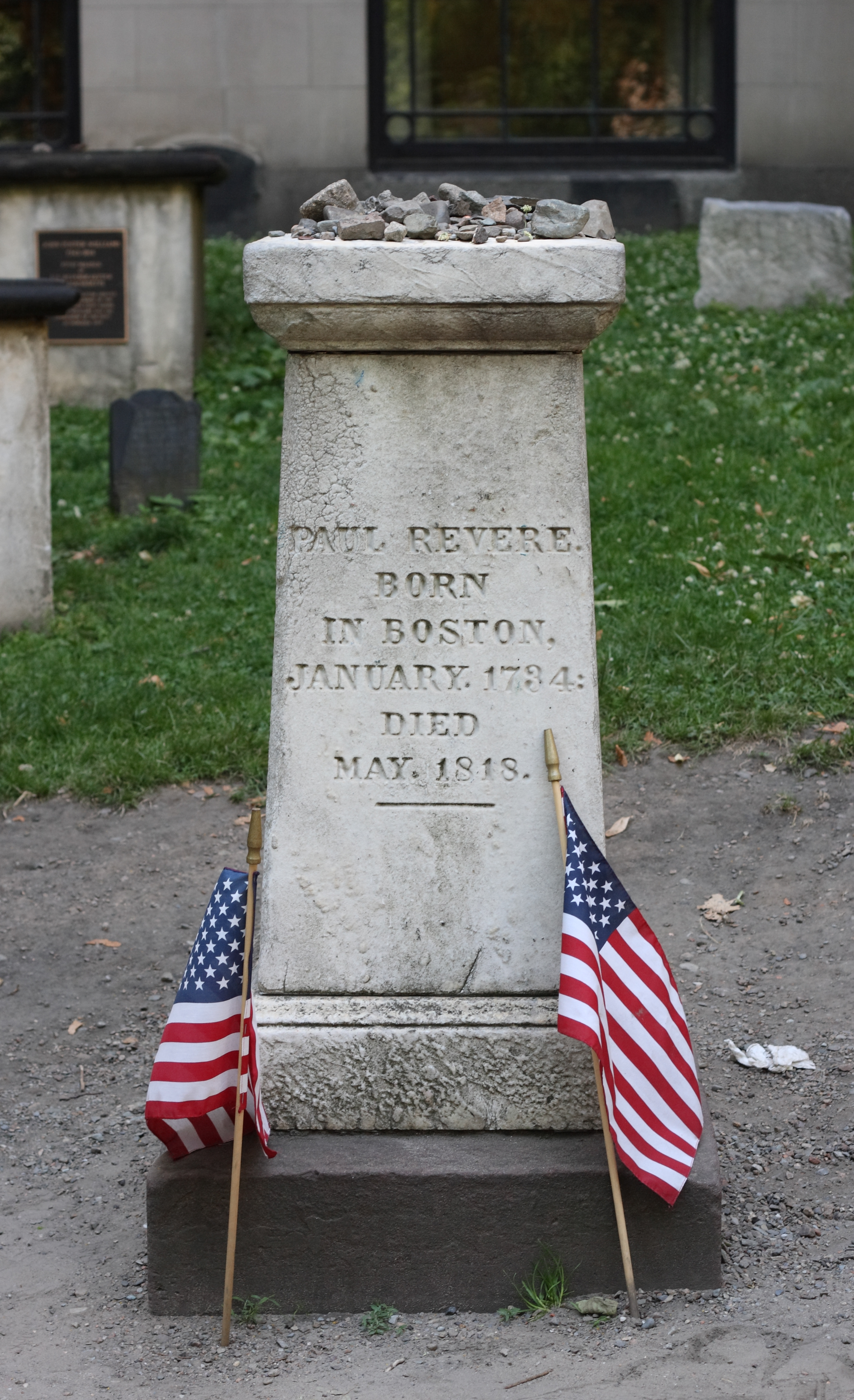
Paul Revere's grave site in the Granary Burying Ground

Revere remained politically active throughout his life. His business plans in the late 1780s were often stymied by a shortage of adequate money in circulation. Alexander Hamilton's national policies regarding banks and industrialization exactly matched his dreams, and he became an ardent Federalist committed to building a robust economy and a powerful nation. Of particular interest to Revere was the question of protective tariffs; he and his son sent a petition to Congress in 1808 asking for protection for his sheet copper business. He continued to participate in local discussions of political issues even after his retirement in 1811, and in 1814 circulated a petition offering the government the services of Boston's artisans in protecting Boston during the War of 1812. Revere died on May 10, 1818, at the age of 83, at his home on Charter Street in Boston. He is buried in the Granary Burying Ground on Tremont Street.

== Legacy ==
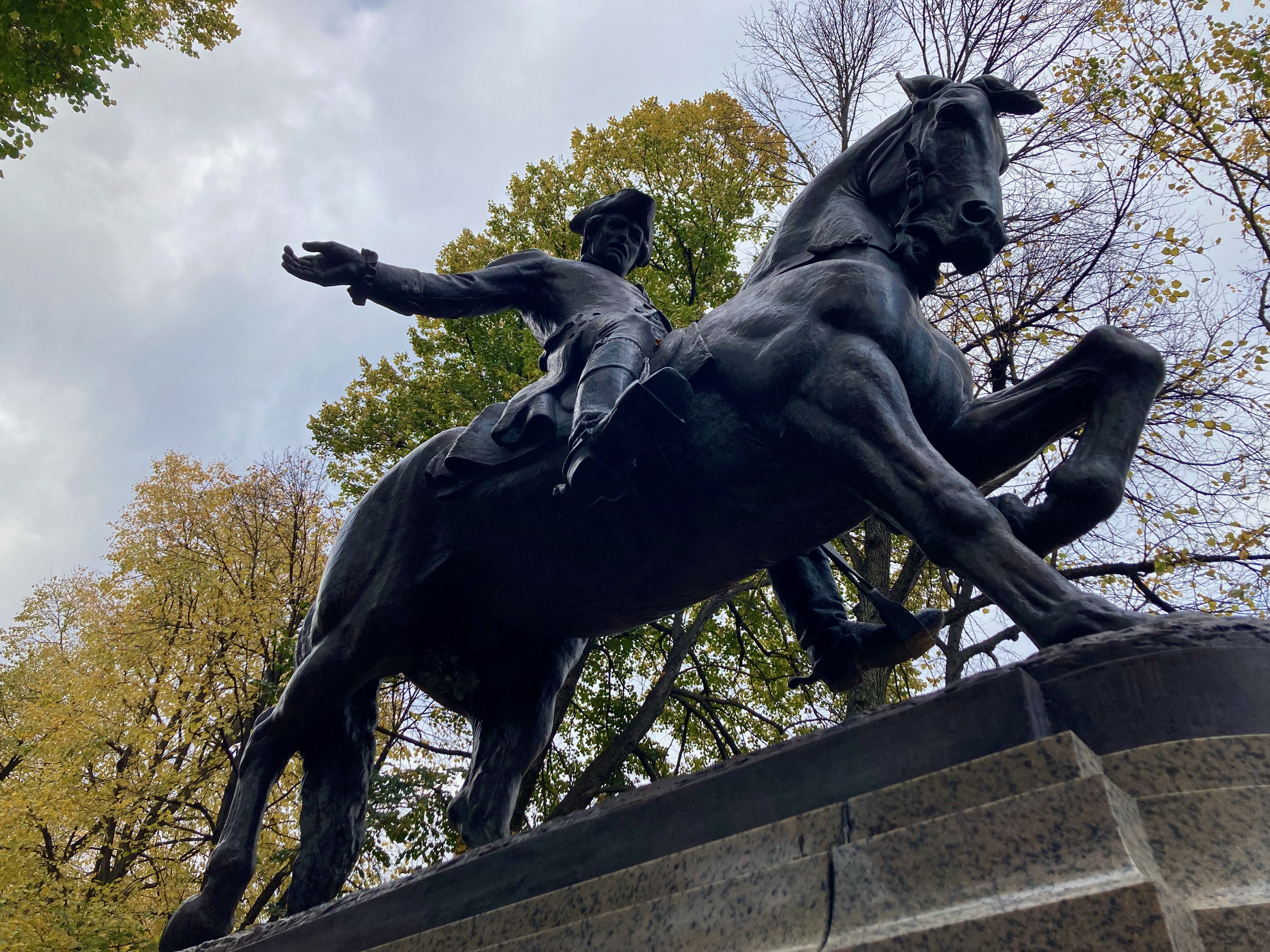
Paul Revere Equestrian Statue by Cyrus Edwin Dallin on Paul Revere Mall in Boston (2022)

After Revere's death, the family business was taken over by his oldest surviving son, Joseph Warren Revere. The copper works founded in 1801 continues today as the Revere Copper Company, with manufacturing divisions in Rome, New York, and New Bedford, Massachusetts.

Revere's original silverware, engravings, and other works are highly regarded today, and can be found on display in museums including the Museum of Fine Arts, Boston and the Metropolitan Museum of Art. The Revere Bell, presented in 1843 to the Church of St. Andrew in Singapore by his daughter, Mrs. Maria Revere Balestier, wife of American consul Joseph Balestier, is now displayed in the National Museum of Singapore. This is the only bell cast by the Revere foundry that is outside the United States. For a time, it was displayed behind velvet ropes in the foyer of the United States Embassy in Singapore.

The communities of Revere, Massachusetts, and Revere, Minnesota, bear his name, as do Revere Beach in Revere, Massachusetts; Revere Avenue in The Bronx, New York City; Paul Revere Road in Arlington, Massachusetts; and Paul Revere Apartments in Seattle.

A 25-cent 1958 U.S. postage stamp in the Liberty Series honors Paul Revere, featuring the portrait by Gilbert Stuart. He also appears on the $5,000 Series EE U.S. Savings Bond. Ryan Reynolds released a Mint Mobile commercial that features Avery Revere, a direct descent of Paul Revere.

Paul Revere Mall is a corridor located in Boston's North End behind Old North Church. It features the Equestrian statue of Paul Revere by Cyrus Edwin Dallin. The Revere Hotel Boston Common also displays in its lobby a sculpture by Oregon-based artist Brian Mock depicting Revere on horseback, created from recycled materials.

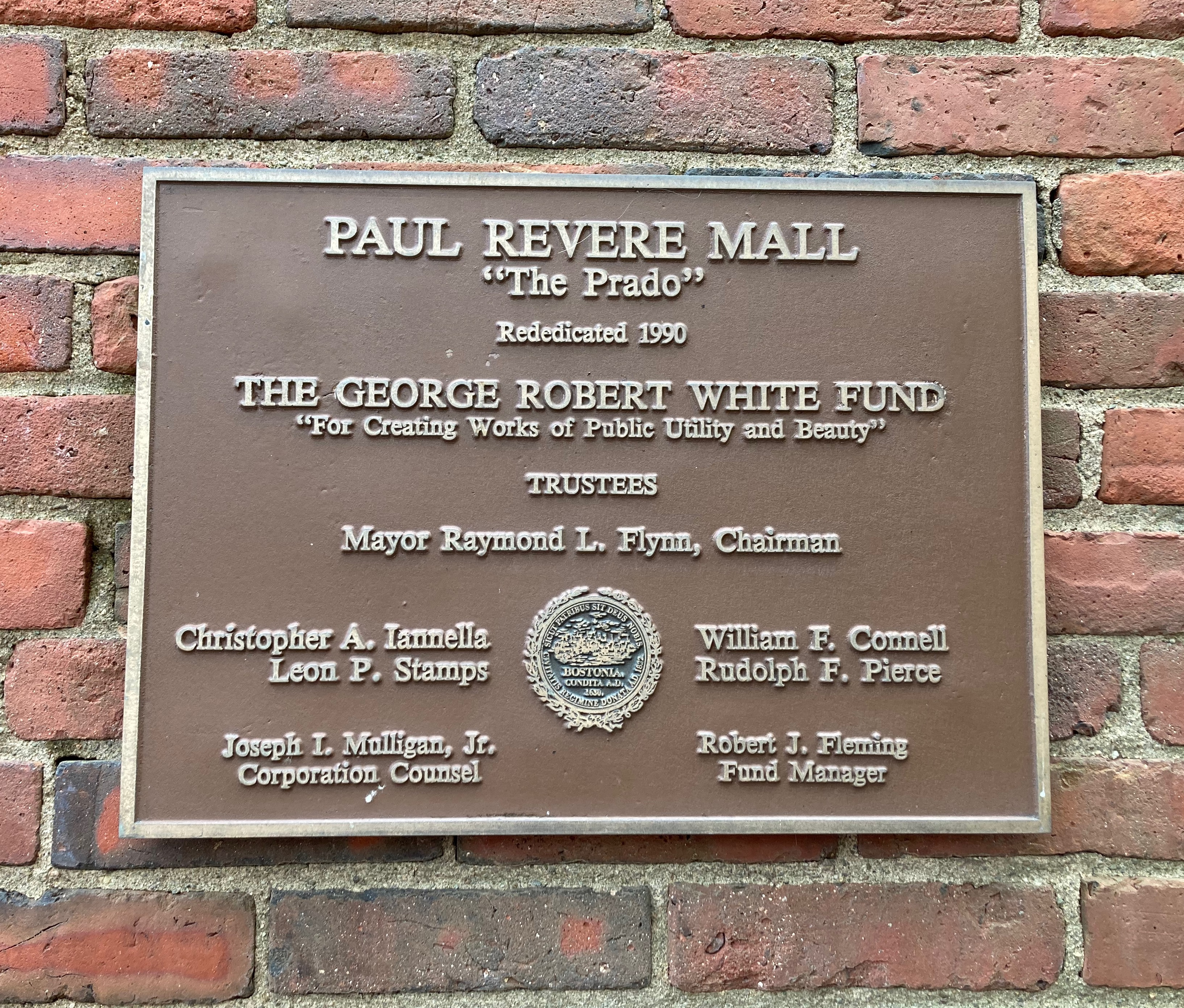
Paul Revere Mall plaque

=== In popular culture ===
In episode 8 of the 2nd season of the US TV show The West Wing (1999–2006), Paul Revere is named as the manufacturer of president Bartlet's knife-set he presents to Charlie, his personal aide.

Revere appears in the 2012 video game Assassin's Creed III and is portrayed by Bruce Dinsmore. He is fictitiously depicted riding alongside the game's protagonist, Ratonhnaké:ton, to alert the colonial militias.

In Harry Chapin's 14 minute song "There Only Was One Choice" (1977), Paul Revere is referenced in the line: "His voice was Chicken Little's, but he's hearing Paul Revere." The lyric draws a contrast between the panicked alarmism of the fictional Chicken Little and Revere's historical role as a measured and heroic messenger, emphasizing Revere as a figure who communicates urgent warning responsibly rather than through fear.

Sylvester Stallone voiced Revere in the animated series Liberty's Kids.

Michael Raymond-James portrayed Revere on the 2015 History miniseries Sons of Liberty.

Revere is mentioned in the lyrics of Bob Dylan's 1965 song "Tombstone Blues".

Beastie Boys, Johnny Cash, and Noah Kahan have all released songs named after Paul Revere.

Revere is mentioned numerous times in the lyrics of Noah Kahan's 2023 song "Paul Revere".

Paul Revere is brought to the present by Esmeralda in the Bewitched episode "Paul Revere Rides Again". He is played by actor Bert Convy.

Johnny Tremain meets Paul Revere in the 1943 novel of the same name.

=== Descendants ===
- Joseph Warren Revere, son
- Maria Revere Balestier, daughter
- Joseph Warren Revere, grandson; artist, Navy officer, and Union Army general
- Paul Revere, great-grandson; Morristown lawyer
- Paul Revere Jr. (3rd great-grandson)
- Paul Revere III (4th great-grandson)
  - Pauline Revere Thayer, daughter of Paul Revere III
- Avery Revere (4th great-granddaughter)

== See also ==
- Israel Bissell, who rode to Philadelphia with news of the battles of Lexington and Concord
- Sybil Ludington, who is said to have performed a similar ride in New York
- Jack Jouett, rode to warn Thomas Jefferson and the Virginia legislature of a British raid
- Revere Bells, one of Revere's highest-profile products
- Revere Copper Company, the business founded by Paul Revere and later managed by his son and grandsons

== Citations ==
=== Bibliography ===
- Alexander, John (2002). Samuel Adams: America's Revolutionary Politician. Lanham, MD: Rowman and Littlefield. ISBN 978-0-7425-2114-8.
- Boatner, Mark Mayo III (1975) [1964]. Encyclopedia of the American Revolution. Library of Military History. New York: David McKay. ISBN 978-0-618-00194-1.
- Brooks, Victor (1999). The Boston Campaign: April 1775 – March 1776. Conshohocken, Pennsylvania: Combined Publishing. ISBN 978-0-585-23453-3.
- Copley, John Singleton; Pelham, Henry (1914). Letters & papers of John Singleton Copley and Henry Pelham, 1739-1776. Boston: The Massachusetts historical society. p. 83.
- Drake, Samuel Adams (1899). Historic Mansions and Highways Around Boston. Boston: Little, Brown. p. 128. OCLC 1838072.
- Falino, Jeannine (2001). "The Pride Which Pervades thro every Class": The Customers of Paul Revere. Boston, Massachusetts: University Press of Virginia.
- Federhen, Deborah (1988). From Artisan to Entrepreneur: Paul Revere's Silver Shop Operation. Boston, Massachusetts: Paul Revere Memorial Association.
- Fischer, David Hackett (1994). Paul Revere's ride. New York: Oxford University Press. ISBN 0-19-508847-6. This work is extensively footnoted, and contains a voluminous list of primary resources concerning all aspects of the Revere's ride and the battles at Lexington and Concord.
- Forbes, Esther (1999) [1942]. Paul Revere and the World He Lived in. Boston: Houghton Mifflin. ISBN 978-0-618-00194-1.
- Gettemy, Charles (1905). The True Story of Paul Revere. Boston: Little, Brown. OCLC 1375230.
- Goss, Elbridge Henry (1891). The Life of Colonel Paul Revere. Boston: J. G. Cupples. OCLC 3589045. (Volume 2)
- Ketchum, Robert (1999) [1974]. Decisive Day: The Battle For Bunker Hill. New York: Henry Holt and Co. ISBN 978-0-8050-6099-7.
- Martello, Robert (2010). Midnight Ride, Industrial Dawn: Paul Revere and the Growth of American Enterprise. Johns Hopkins Studies in the History of Technology. Baltimore: The Johns Hopkins University Press.
- McDonald, Forrest; McDonald, Ellen (April 1980). "The Ethnic Origins of the American People, 1790". The William and Mary Quarterly. Third. 37 (2): 179–199. doi:10.2307/1919495. JSTOR 1919495.
- McNamara, John (1978). History in Asphalt: The Origin of Bronx Street and Place Names, Borough of the Bronx, New York City. Fleischmanns, New York: Harbor Hill Books.
- Miller, Joel J. (2010). The Revolutionary Paul Revere. Nashville, Tennessee: Thomas Nelson. ISBN 978-1-59555-074-3.
- Murrin, John M.; et al. (2002) [1996]. Liberty, Equality, Power: A History of the American People, Volume I: To 1877. Florence, Kentucky: Wadsworth–Thomson Learning.
- Paul Revere, Artisan, Businessman and Patriot: The Man Behind the Myth. Boston: Paul Revere Memorial Association (PRMA). 1988.
- Revere, Paul (1961). Paul Revere's Three Accounts of His Famous Ride. Introduction by Edmund Morgan. Boston: Massachusetts Historical Society. ISBN 978-0-9619999-0-2.
- Ruland, Richard; Bradbury, Malcolm (1991). From Puritanism to Postmodernism: A History of American Literature. New York: Viking.
- Schmidt, Leah A (2002). Revere Beach. Mount Pleasant, SC: Arcadia Publishing. ISBN 978-0-7385-1030-9.
- Steblecki, Edith J. (1985). Paul Revere and Freemasonry. Boston: Paul Revere Memorial Association (PRMA). OCLC 17485269.
- Triber, Jayne (1998). A True Republican: The Life of Paul Revere. Amherst, Massachusetts: University of Massachusetts Press. ISBN 978-1-55849-139-7.
- United States, National Archives and Records Service. Papers of the Continental Congress, 1774–1789. National Archives and Records Administration, General Services Administration.
- Upham, Warren (1920). Minnesota Geographic Names: Their Origin and Historic Significance. St. Paul, Minnesota: Minnesota Historical Society. OCLC 34232868.
- Waters, Deborah Dependahl (2013). A Handsome Cupboard of Plate: Early American Silver in the Cahn Collection. Cambridge, England: John Adamson. ISBN 978-1-898565-11-6.
