= Joseph Warren Revere =

Joseph Warren Revere may refer to:

- Joseph Warren Revere (businessman) (1777–1868), co-founder of the Revere Copper Company, son of Paul Revere
- Joseph Warren Revere (general) (1812–1880), US Civil War general and author, grandson of Paul Revere
