= Rachel Walker Revere =

Wife of Paul Revere (1745–1813)

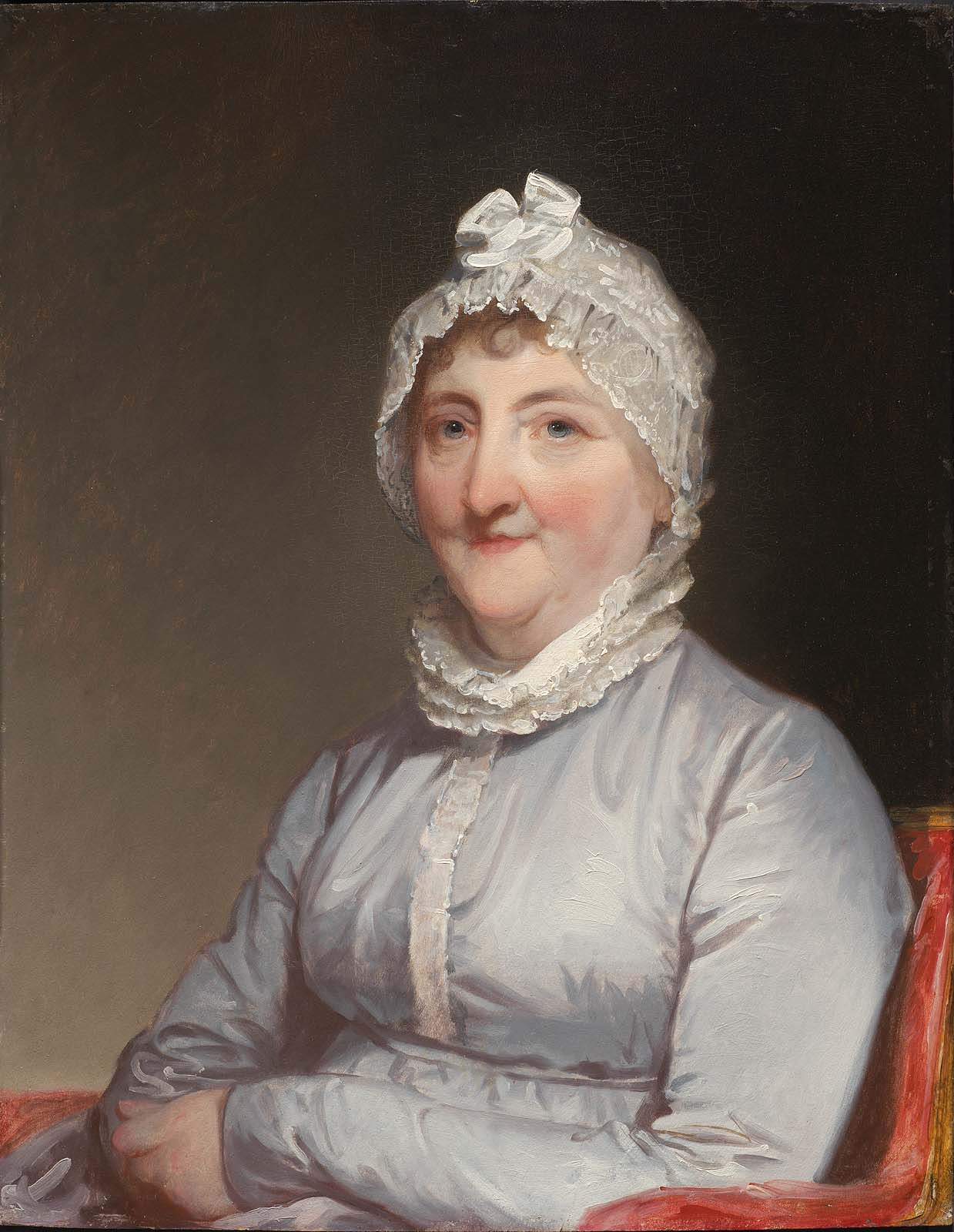
- Portrait by Gilbert Stuart, 1813
- Born: December 27, 1745; Boston, Massachusetts
- Died: June 26, 1813 (aged 67); Boston, Massachusetts
- Spouse: Paul Revere
- Children: 8: Joseph Warren Revere; Harriet Revere; Maria Revere

Rachel Walker Revere (1745 – June 26, 1813) was a witness to the American Revolution, and the wife and close confidant of Paul Revere (1734–1818). During the American Revolution, she supported Paul Revere by caring for their family, supplying Revere with food and equipment, and getting their family safely out of the city at the start of the Siege of Boston.

Revere is an important historical example of a wife of a patriot soldier whose life is relatively well documented, and is used by historians to discuss the role of women in the Revolutionary War effort. In 1991, she was honored by a stop on the Boston Women's Heritage Trail.

== Life and family ==
Rachel Walker Revere was born in 1745 to Rachel Carlile and Richard Walker. For her entire childhood and young adult life, she lived in North Square in the North End neighborhood of Boston.

Historians have concluded from her writings and personal letters that Revere was highly educated and literate for a woman of her time.

Revere was a devout Protestant, and attended a number of Congregationalist and Anglican churches over the course of her life.

Rachel married Paul Revere in 1774, five months after the death of his first wife Sarah Orne Revere. She immediately assumed responsibility as a stepmother of Sarah's six surviving children and care for Paul's elderly mother, Deborah Hichborn Revere. During her marriage to Paul, she also had eight children of her own, including Joseph Warren Revere, Harriet Revere, and Maria Revere.

Rachel and Paul Revere seem to have had a close and companionate marriage. While courting, Paul wrote her a love poem punning on her name, and the couple's letters often include affectionate terms for each other. Her husband's wartime letters to Revere often include a large level of detail about military movements and strategies – rare for wartime letters to wives to include at the time – suggesting a particularly close relationship between the two.

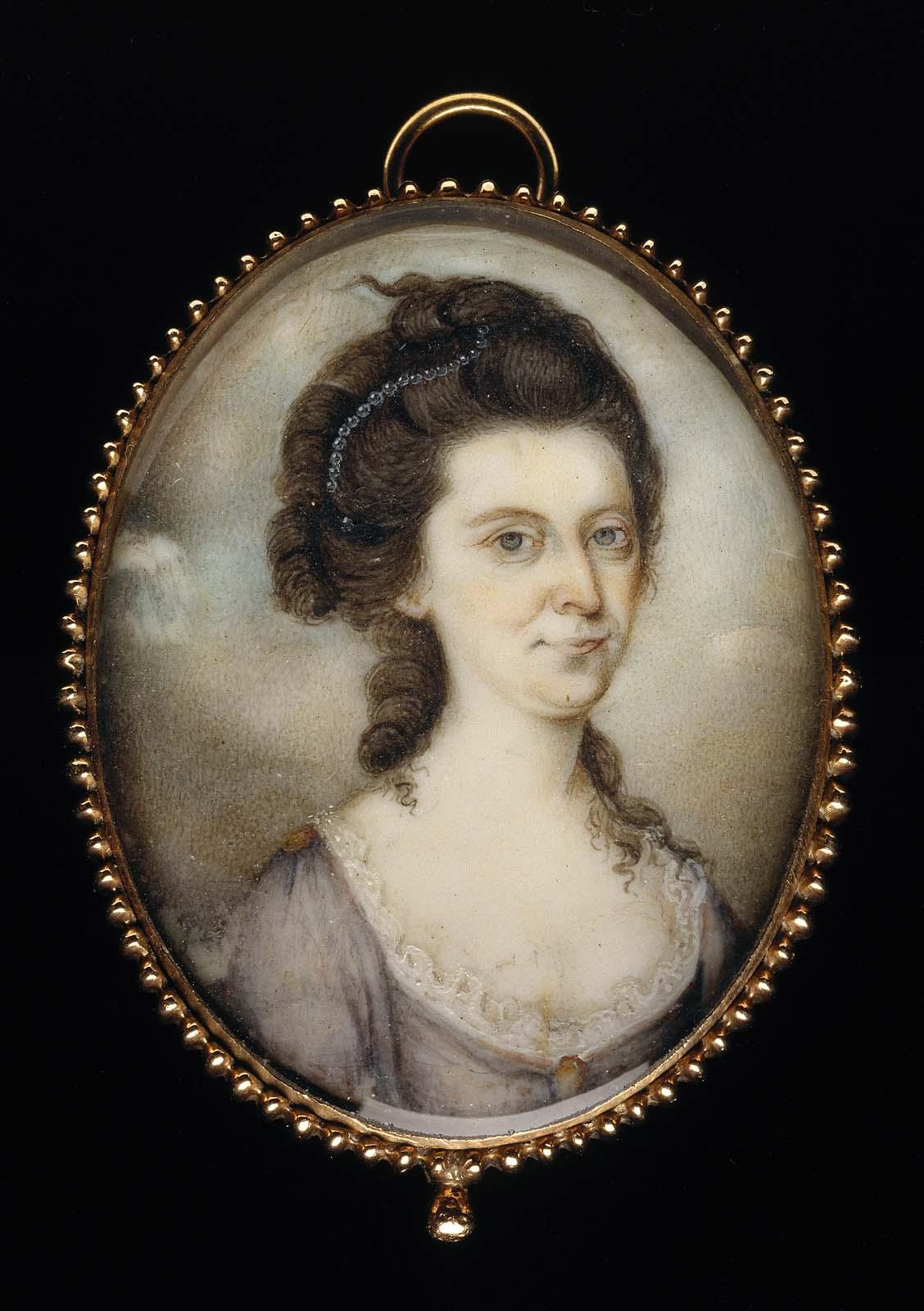
Portrait miniature by Joseph Dunkerley, ca. 1784

Rachel Revere's portrait was painted in 1784 by Joseph Dunkerley, who was boarding with the Reveres at the time. It is possible that Dunkerly painted this portrait as a rent payment to the Reveres.

== American Revolution ==
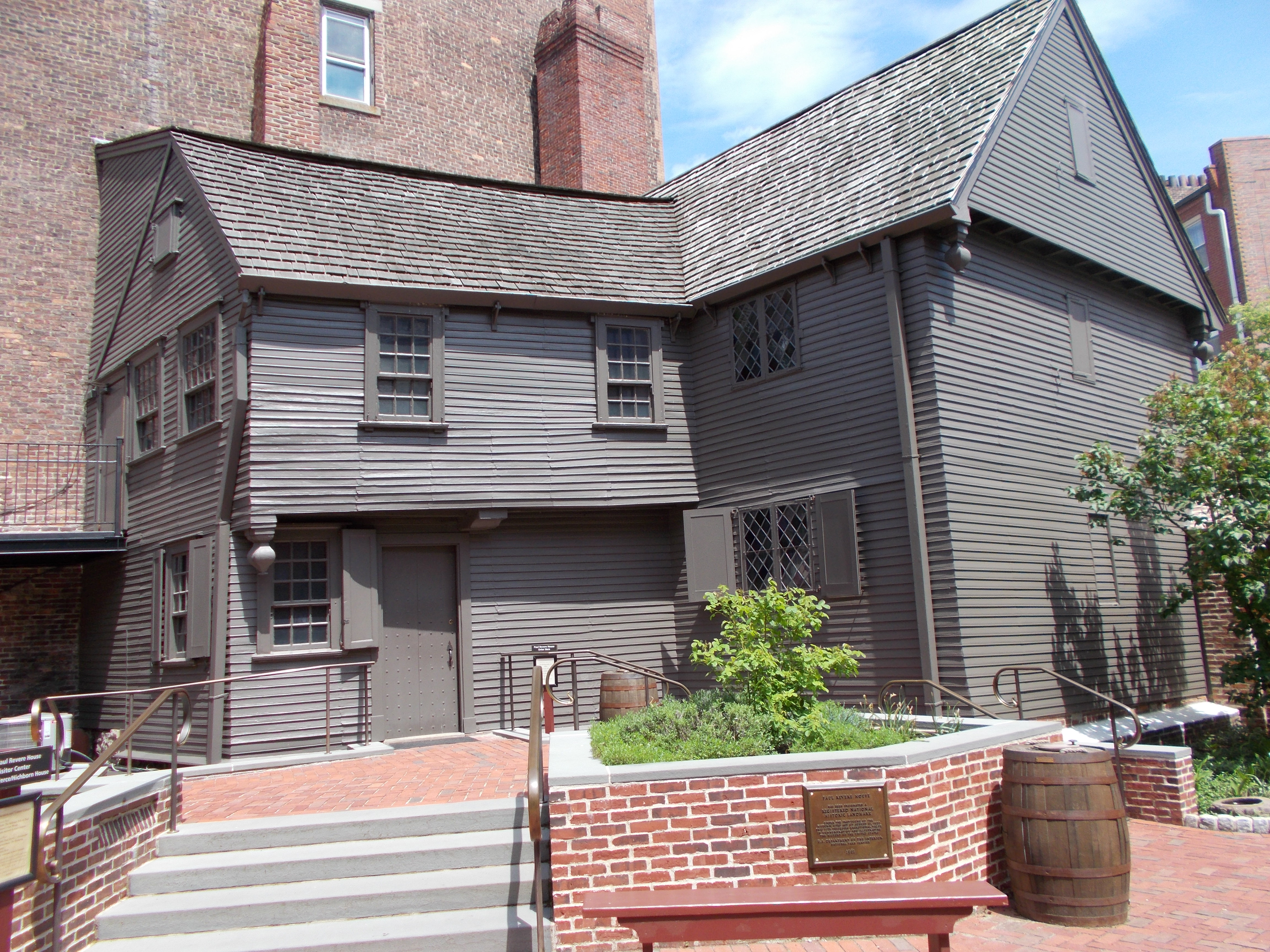
Rachel Revere's residence in Boston's North End is now preserved as a historic house museum.

Throughout the lead-up to the American Revolution, Rachel Revere supported her husband's revolutionary activities by maintaining his household, and caring for his children, allowing him to continue his work full time as a silversmith while also participating in covert political activities and messenger work for the Sons of Liberty. For instance, while Rachel was pregnant with her first child, Joshua Revere, in 1774, Paul Revere embarked on one of his longest rides to deliver the Suffolk Resolves to Philadelphia, and just following Joshua's birth, he left on another emergency mission to Portsmouth, New Hampshire, leaving Rachel alone to care of the household. When her husband's political activities took him away from home, she managed his silver shop, including collecting debts from customers.

At the beginning of the Siege of Boston, Revere and her family fled from British-occupied Boston to Patriot-controlled Watertown. Since her husband could not return to Boston after his "midnight ride", Revere alone managed organizing her extended family, collecting the family's outstanding debts, and arranging the leasing of her husband's silver shop to a Tory friend. It is likely that she bribed a British officer with bottles of beer and wine to secure a pass to allow her family to safely leave Boston. She also attempted to send a large sum of money to Paul Revere through a mutual acquaintance, Benjamin Church, a British spy who instead turned her letter in to General Gage. The letter was later found by historians in a trunk of Gage's papers in England.

After the siege ended and the Revere family was able to move back to Boston, she continued to support her husband's military career by caring for his children and mother in his absence and managing his businesses and finances.

Revere biographer Esther Forbes described Rachel Revere as having a "fervor for the Whig cause."

Historian Tory Atkins has argued that wives or revolutionary war combatants, such as Rachel Revere or Abigail Adams, "should be remembered not only as wives of influential men, but as important political actors in their own right." The depth of primary sources concerning her life makes Rachel Revere an important example who historians use to understand women's wartime experience of the American Revolution.

== Later years and death ==
In her later years, Revere split her time between her home in Boston and her family's estate near Paul Revere's copper mill in Canton, Massachusetts.

A reference to Rachel appears in a poem written by Paul Revere later in life:

Not distant from Taunton Road,
In Canton Dale, is my abode.
My cot tho small, my mind's at ease,
My better half, takes pains to please.
Content, sits lolling in her chair
And all my friends find welcome here.

In 1813, just weeks before her death, Revere's portrait was painted by Gilbert Stuart.

Revere died on June 26, 1813, from "a bilious colic." She is buried along with her husband in the Granary Burying Ground in Boston.

== Legacy ==
In 1945, the park across the street from the Paul Revere House was dedicated as "Rachel Revere Square".

Rachel Revere appears as a character in The Secret of Sarah Revere (1995) by Ann Rinaldi, which speculates about her life during the start of the American Revolution and her relationship with her stepchildren.

In 1991, she was honored with a stop on the Boston Women's Heritage Trail.
