= Portrait of Paul Revere =

1768 painting by John Singleton Copley

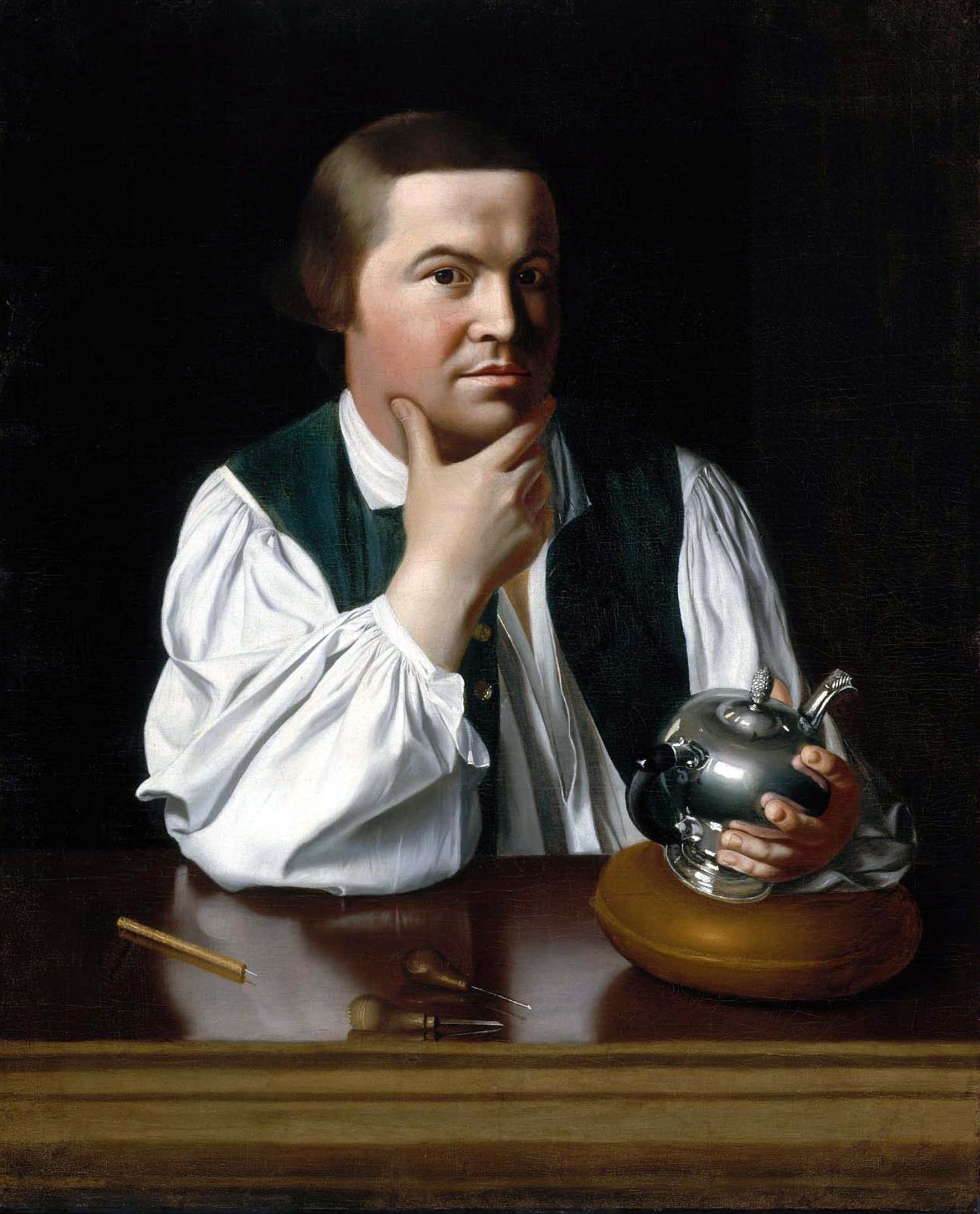
- Artist: John Singleton Copley
- Year: 1768
- Dimensions: 72.39 cm × 89.22 cm (28 1/2 in × 35 1/8 in)
- Location: Museum of Fine Arts, Boston

Portrait of Paul Revere is a painting by John Singleton Copley of American silversmith and revolutionary Paul Revere. Painted 1768, it is held in the Museum of Fine Arts, Boston.

Copley and Revere were good friends, with Copley often purchasing frames from Revere. Between 1765 and 1770, Copley owed debts to Revere, primarily for frames he used on portrait miniatures. Copley is believed to have painted the portrait for Revere to absolve his debts.

For the portrait, Revere did not dress formally and did not apply hair texture powder, a fashion symbol of the time. Instead, he resumed his work on the teapot depicted in the painting while Copley painted. While painting it, Copley possibly referred to his portrait of Peter Pelham, as he rarely painted artisans. In it, Revere sits at his workbench with his tools laid across it. He wears a blue waistcoat with shirtsleeves and an unbuttoned undershirt. His right hand sits on his chin, while his left hand holds a silver teapot. Teapots were the most complex creations of Revere, signifying his expertise. Painted realistically, it contrasted the "elegance" of English portraits of the time. However, the outfit's gold buttons and cleanliness, as well as the polished look of his workbench, are unrealistic.

It was the first portrait of Revere, which was followed by two others during his lifetime. After his death in 1818, the portrait was inherited by his family. His daughter, Harriet, disliked its informal depiction of Revere and had a copy made by Joseph Warren Revere, Revere's grandson, in which the latter reused only the face but depicted him in a red uniform. The original portrait sat in an attic in Boston for some years in the late 19th century. By 1912, after it was restored, it was owned by Mrs. John Revere. In 1928, it was loaned to the Museum of Fine Arts, Boston.

The portrait depicted manual labor, a rarity for the time. Though Revere was not known for his revolutionary efforts at the time it was painted, his depiction in it – namely his facial expression – was described by Carol Strickland and John Boswell as having "summed up the revolution's call for independence". The portrait was also described by Carrie Rebora Barratt as "one of the major icons in American colonial painting". It was described by Mark Feeney as "unusual".
