= ADR-8 =

ADR-8A
- Type: Chaff rocket
- Place of origin: United States

Service history
- Used by: United States Air Force

Production history
- Designer: Tracor
- Designed: early 1960s
- Manufacturer: Revere Copper and Brass

Specifications
- Length: 5 feet (1.5 m)
- Diameter: 2.75 inches (70 mm)
- Warhead: Chaff
- Propellant: Solid fuel
- Guidance system: None
- Launch platform: B-52 Stratofortress

The ADR-8 was an unguided electronic countermeasures rocket developed by Tracor for use by the United States Air Force. It was used to dispense chaff from Boeing B-52 Stratofortress bombers.

== Development ==
Originally given the designation RCU-2, the ADR-8 was developed for use by the Boeing B-52 Stratofortress strategic bomber, to give the aircraft a means of dispensing chaff to disrupt enemy radar. Developed by Tracor under a Quick Reaction Contract, the ADR-8 was a folding fin rocket of 2.75 in (70 mm) diameter. Following successful testing, production of the rocket was undertaken by Revere Copper and Brass.

== Operational use ==
The rockets were fired from 20-shot AN/ALE-25 rocket pods mounted on pylons under the wings of the B-52s. The pods were 13 feet (4.0 m) long and weighed 1,100 pounds (500 kg); the rockets could be fired manually or automatically upon detection of a threat. They were installed on the final 18 B-52H aircraft constructed; earlier B-52Gs and B-52Hs were retrofitted with the system.

The ADR-8 and AN/ALE-25 were retired in September 1970, replaced by the "Phase VI" electronic warfare suite.
