= Joseph Warren Revere (businessman) =

American businessman (1777–1868)

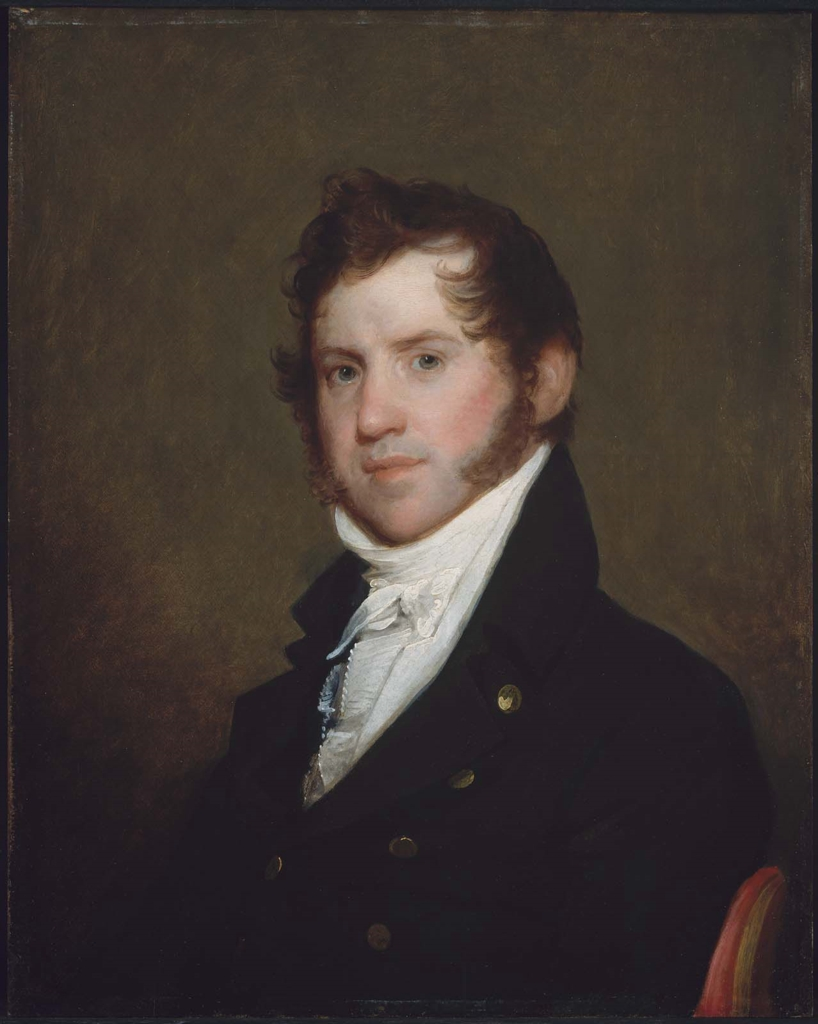
- Portrait of Revere by Gilbert Stuart, c. 1813.
- Born: April 30, 1777; Boston, Massachusetts, U.S.
- Died: October 11, 1868 (aged 91); Canton, Massachusetts, U.S.
- Spouse: Mary Robbins
- Children: 8; including Paul Joseph Revere
- Parents: Paul Revere (father); Rachel Revere (mother)

Joseph Warren Revere (April 30, 1777 – October 11, 1868) was an American businessman and the son of Revolutionary War patriot Paul Revere.

== Early life ==
Revere was born on April 30, 1777, in Boston, Massachusetts. He was named after Dr. Joseph Warren, the Massachusetts militiaman who was killed in action during the Battle of Bunker Hill in 1775, and who sent Revere's father on his famous midnight ride. He was the third of eight children born to Paul Revere (1734–1818) and his second wife, Rachel Revere (née Walker) (1745–1813).

== Career ==
In 1801, his father purchased the Canton Mill, an ironworks mill, and using a loan from the Department of the Navy, established the Revere Copper Company in Canton, Massachusetts, which young Revere joined in 1804. Upon his father's retirement in 1811, he became president of the company. He was largely responsible for the success of the business, in which he pioneered the technique of rolling copper into large sheets.

From 1816 to 1819 and again in 1840, Revere served in the Massachusetts Legislature and was a member of the Board of Aldermen in the 1830s. He also was a member of the Massachusetts Humane Society, an organization that provided money for the physically and mentally ill and the poor, and the Massachusetts Charitable Mechanic Association.

== Personal life ==
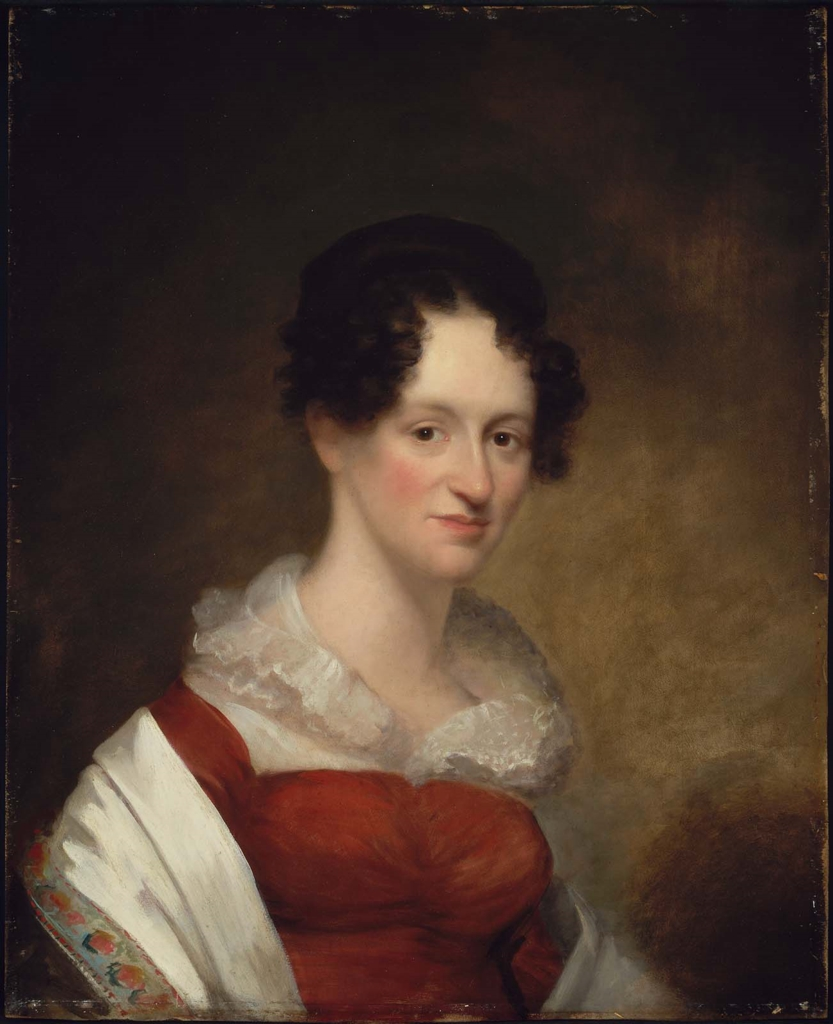
Portrait of Revere's wife, Mary Robbins, by James Frothingham, c. 1821.

On April 16, 1821, he married Mary Robbins (1794–1879) in Milton, Massachusetts. Mary was the daughter of Elizabeth (née Murray) Robbins and Edward Hutchinson Robbins, the former Lieutenant Governor of Massachusetts. Together, Joseph and Mary Revere were the parents of eight children:

- John Revere (1822–1886), who married Susan Tilden Torrey (1826–1911), daughter of John Gore Torrey, in 1848.
- Joseph Revere (b. 1823)
- Edward Hutchinson Robbins Revere (1827–1862), a member of the 20th Massachusetts Infantry during the Civil War who was an assistant surgeon in the regiment was killed during the Battle of Antietam.
- Elizabeth Murray Revere (1828–1910), who married Robert Possac Rogers.
- Maria Amelia Revere (1828–1905)
- Mary Josephine Revere (b. 1830)
- Paul Joseph Revere (1832–1863), also a member of the 20th Massachusetts Infantry during the Civil War who was a major in the regiment, received a mortal wound during the Battle of Gettysburg and died of his wound on July 4, 1863.
- Jane Minot Revere (1834–1910), who married Dr. John Phillips Reynolds (1825–1909) in 1859.

Revere died, aged 91, on October 11, 1868, in Canton, Massachusetts.
