= Charles Ferris Gettemy =

American statistician and journalist

Charles Ferris Gettemy (March 12, 1868 – October 5, 1939) was an American journalist and statistician.

Gettemy was born on March 12, 1868, in Chicago. He attended Knox College and Harvard University. At university, Gettemy joined the fraternities Phi Beta Kappa and Beta Theta Pi. After graduation, Gettemy worked for the Boston Advertiser as a correspondent based in Washington, D. C. He later assumed the same role for the Boston Record until 1899, when he became political editor of the Boston Herald. In November 1905, Gettemy joined the staff of Curtis Guild Jr. In 1907, a year after Guild took office as governor of Massachusetts, he appointed Gettemy the director of the state's Bureau of Statistics. In his capacity as bureau director, Gettemy oversaw the 1905 and 1915 state censuses. Additionally, Gettemy headed the Massachusetts Homestead Commission from 1911 to 1919, and served as director of military enrollment in Massachusetts during World War I. Gettemy left the Massachusetts Bureau of Statistics on July 11, 1919, working for the Federal Reserve Bank of Boston as an assistant federal reserve agent until retirement in 1937.

Gettemy became a member of the American Statistical Association in 1907 and was granted fellowship in 1914. He was president of the ASA's Boston chapter from 1929 to 1930. Gettemy died in Boston on October 5, 1939, aged 71.
