= Revere Copper Company =

Copper rolling mill in the United States

- Type: Private
- Founded: 1801; 225 years ago Canton, Massachusetts, U.S.
- Founder: Paul Revere and Joseph Warren Revere
- Headquarters: Rome, New York, U.S.
- Products: Revere Ware, ADR-8

The Revere Copper Company is a copper rolling mill in the United States. It operated North America's first copper rolling mill. It was started by Paul Revere in 1801 in Canton, Massachusetts, and developed a commercially viable process for manufacturing copper sheets.

== History ==
=== Copper rolling process ===
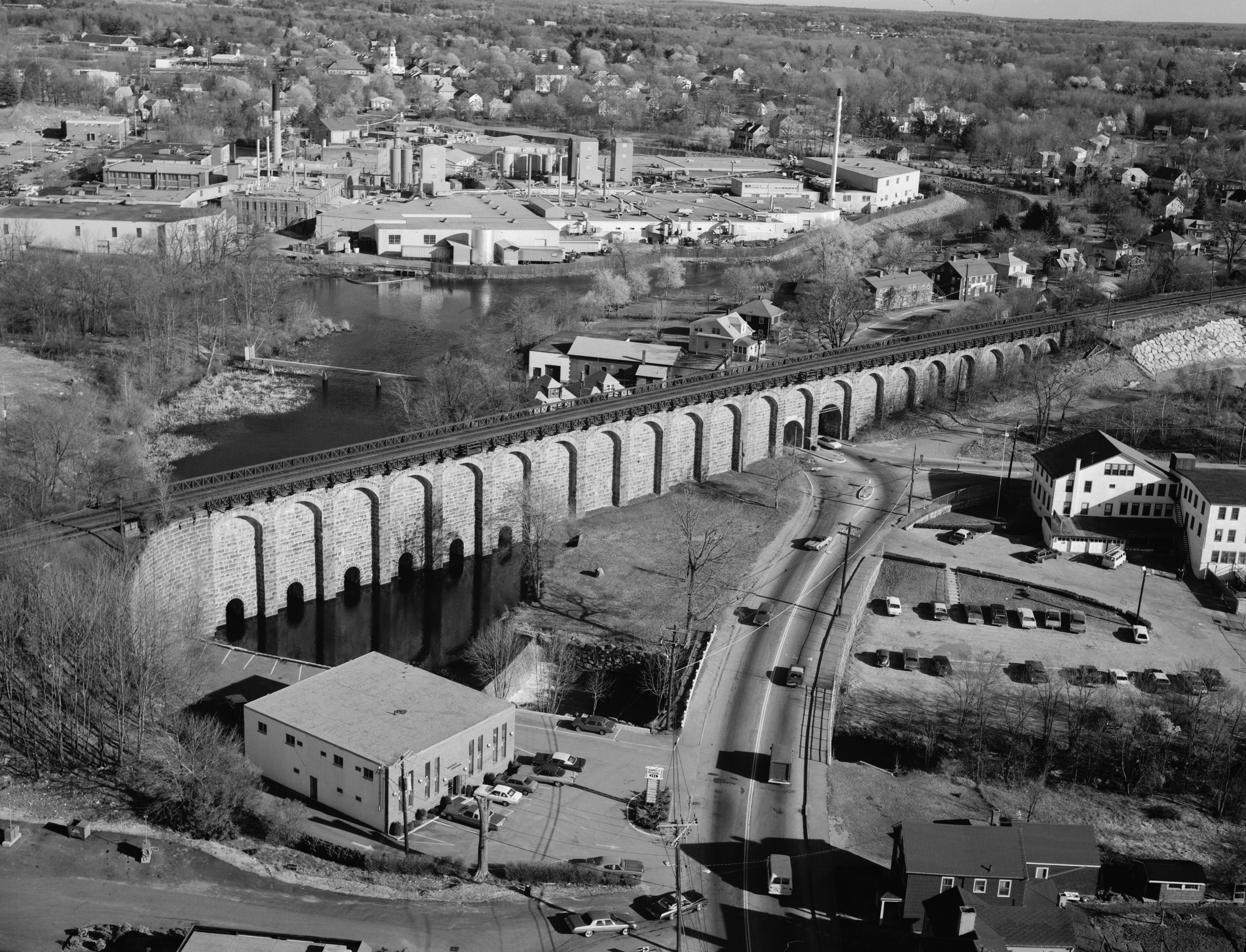
Paul Revere's Copper Mill with Canton Viaduct in the foreground

Copper rolling is the process of converting large blocks of copper into thin sheets by rolling them gradually down to size. These sheets of copper were used in the 18th and 19th centuries mainly to plate the bottoms of ships. This process of plating ship bottoms, referred to as “sheathing” or “coppering”, helped increase the speed and lifespan of ships. Copper was desired for this process because it reacts with seawater to create an oxide coating that prevents the build-up of barnacles, weeds, and other detritus, in addition to physically stopping shipworms from burrowing into and degrading the wood. Not only did copper sheathing help ships sail faster by keeping their hulls clean, but it also drastically increased the amount of time a ship could remain in service between overhauls. In fact, “British Navy Comptroller Charles Middleton estimated that copper sheathing might double the number of ships at sea at any time”.

=== Revere's interest in copper rolling ===
Paul Revere's interest in copper rolling began when, after the American Revolution, the American navy wanted to begin using this process of copper sheathing the nation's ships. Benjamin Stoddert, a successful businessman and ardent Federalist, recognized the importance of a powerful Navy in preserving the economic and political independence of the new United States. Stoddert used his position as Secretary of the Navy to fund metalworkers such as Paul Revere in the hopes that American manufacturers might be able to develop copper rolling technology of their own and reduce America's reliance on Britain for the majority of its copper products, especially for industrial and military needs.

Revere saw the Navy's desire for copper sheathing as an opportunity to increase both his income and social standing, so he rose to the challenge presented by Stoddert. Revere began rolling copper using his established knowledge of metallurgy gained from his experience as a silversmith and in other endeavors such as bell casting, cannon casting, and the forging of copper bolts and spikes. He had already been rolling silver sheets since 1785, which had taught him the fundamental principles of rolling. However, copper rolling is a much more complex process and, as a beginner in this field, Revere's first copper sheets were not of the same quality as those of the British. Revere had several questions about the superior British process, but the British closely guarded their methods. Whilst Revere had a rough idea of how to roll copper, he sent his son, Joseph Warren Revere, to Britain in 1804 to try to learn more about the details of the British process.

=== Copper rolling and the Canton mill ===
A Jeffersonian era worker at a rolling mill like the one Revere would have used.

Revere purchased a mill in Canton, Massachusetts, for $6,000 in late 1800 to provide a dedicated copper producing facility. The mill was originally an ironworks, but Revere used a loan from the Department of the Navy to convert it into a copper foundry, completing America's first copper rolling mill. The most important pieces of equipment were the rollers themselves, which consisted of large iron cylinders through which raw copper would be inserted and compressed. While Revere admitted that Britain had superior rollers, the difficulty of purchasing equipment related to copper rolling forced him to produce his own.

One of the many insights Revere had gleaned from his son's espionage mission was a rolling mill design with both rollers mechanically coupled and powered by the same source. This mechanism was simpler than that of many other mills. Combining these British practices with his own knowledge and experiments, Revere was able to ultimately develop a method to produce copper sheathing of at least equal quality to that which the British produced; in 1803, Revere wrote a letter to Joshua Humphreys discussing his copper rolling endeavor. In it, he concluded “Our sheets are as well finished and as soft & as free from scales & cannot be distinguished from English”

In 1803, the Department of the Navy commissioned Revere to roll copper sheets to sheathe the hull of USS Constitution. Originally, the Navy had contracted Revere to roll the sheets using a cold rolling technique, but Revere petitioned to roll them hot, with a final cold pass after they annealed. Revere was confident in his technique of mixing hot and cold rolling, claiming it gave a superior combination of flexibility and strength. Hot rolling “would make them less brittle, allows nails to pass through them easily, and form a tighter seal with the ship’s hull”, while a final pass of cold rolling improved the finish and slightly increased the strength. Eventually, Paul Revere's copper sheets would provide sheathing for more ships in the American fleet, cover the original wooden dome of the Massachusetts State House, and even be used for the boilers of one of Robert Fulton’s early steamboats.

=== Later history ===
When the Canton Viaduct was constructed in 1835 for the Boston and Providence Railroad mainline, a spur was added to the Revere site. Joseph Warren Revere, then owner of Revere, was a director of the Boston and Providence Railroad Corporation.

Through a series of mergers in 1928 and 1929, Revere Copper became Revere Copper and Brass, Inc., headquartered in Rome, New York with the first president being George H. Allen, with several plants and product divisions. Revere Copper and Brass ranked 96th among United States corporations in the value of World War II military production contracts. By 1938, James M. Kennedy, an employee, had invented copper-clad cookware, which went into production and is now known as Revere Ware.

The Detroit plant, in collaboration with DuPont, was commissioned to assist the United States Mint in the production of a new copper and copper-nickel composite coin to replace silver coins in 1964. The Detroit plant was responsible for the hot rolling process of the coinage metal, according to a June 3, 2013 article in Coin World News.

The composition metal used a DuPont explosive bonding process called Detaclad, patented by DuPont on June 23, 1964.

The company—now employee-owned—exists as Revere Copper Products, with headquarters in Rome, New York.

Revere Copper's New Bedford, Massachusetts-based operations—a presence in the city for 147 years—ceased in 2008.

== Products ==
=== Kitchenwares ===
- Revere Ware

=== Rockets ===
- ADR-8
