= Riocaud =

- Commune
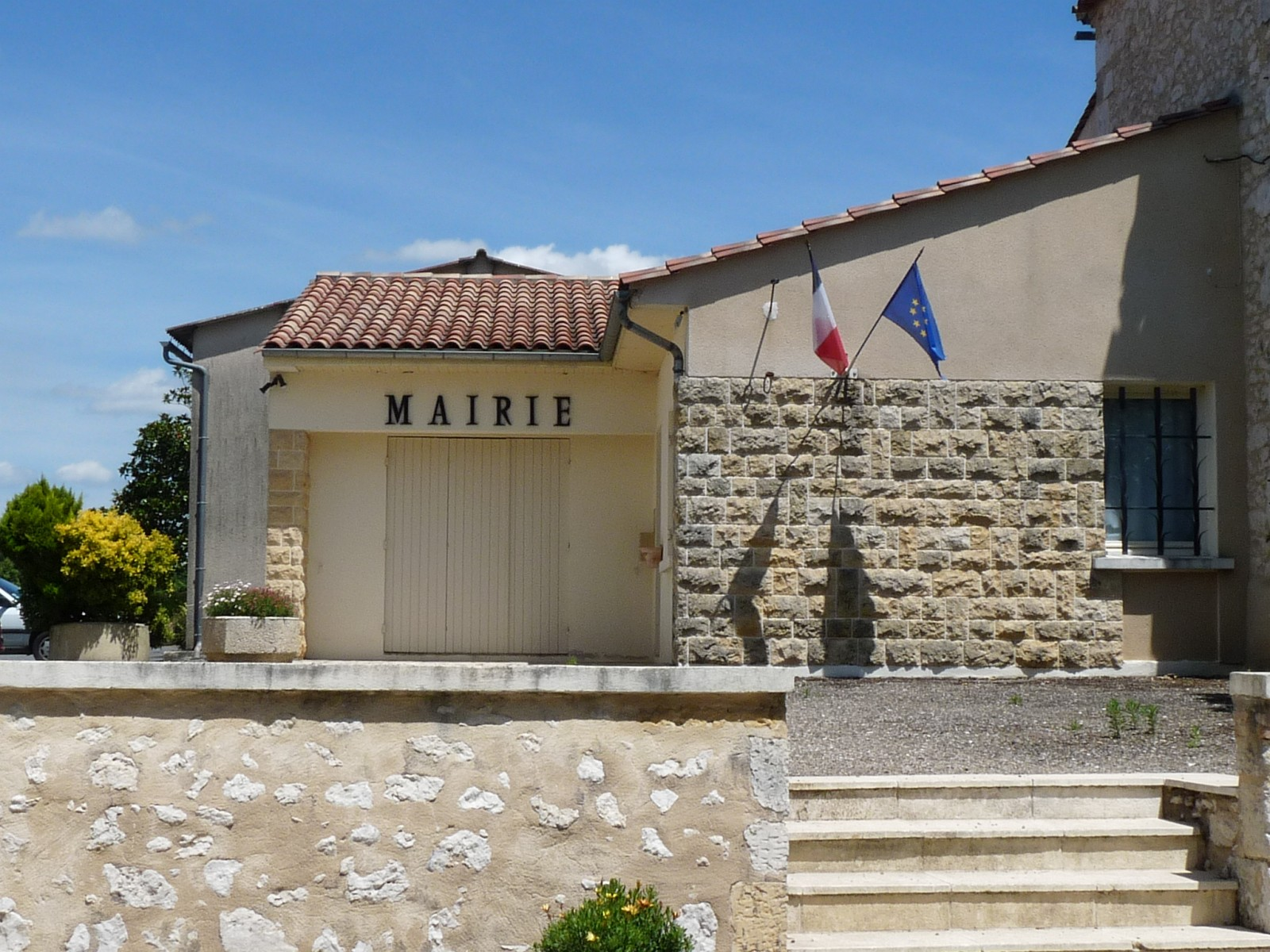
- The town hall in Riocaud
- Location of Riocaud
- Location within France Location within Nouvelle-Aquitaine
- Coordinates: 44°45′55″N 0°12′32″E
- Country: France
- Region: Nouvelle-Aquitaine
- Department: Gironde
- Arrondissement: Libourne
- Canton: Le Réolais et Les Bastides
- Intercommunality: Pays Foyen

Government
  - Mayor (2020–2026): Marie-Hélène Desrozier
- Area^{1}: 3.38 km^{2} (1.31 sq mi)
- Elevation: 40 m (130 ft)
- Highest elevation: 130 m (430 ft)
- Lowest elevation: 60 m (200 ft)
- Population (2023): 195
  - Density: 57.7/km^{2} (149/sq mi)
- Time zone: UTC+01:00 (CET)
  - Summer (DST): UTC+02:00 (CEST)
- INSEE/Postal code: 33354 /33220
- ^{1} French Land Register data, which excludes lakes, ponds, glaciers > 1 km^{2} (0.386 sq mi or 247 acres) and river estuaries.

Riocaud (French pronunciation: [ʁjɔko]; Occitan: Riucau) is a commune in the Gironde department in Nouvelle-Aquitaine in southwestern France.

== Population ==
Historical population
| Year | Pop. | ±% p.a. |
|---|---|---|
| 1968 | 215 | — |
| 1975 | 184 | −2.20% |
| 1982 | 179 | −0.39% |
| 1990 | 164 | −1.09% |
| 1999 | 179 | +0.98% |
| 2007 | 196 | +1.14% |
| 2012 | 195 | −0.10% |
| 2017 | 181 | −1.48% |
| 2023 | 195 | +1.25% |
Source: INSEE

== See also ==
- Communes of the Gironde department
