= Old North Church =

Historic church in Boston, Massachusetts

- Christ Church in the City of Boston
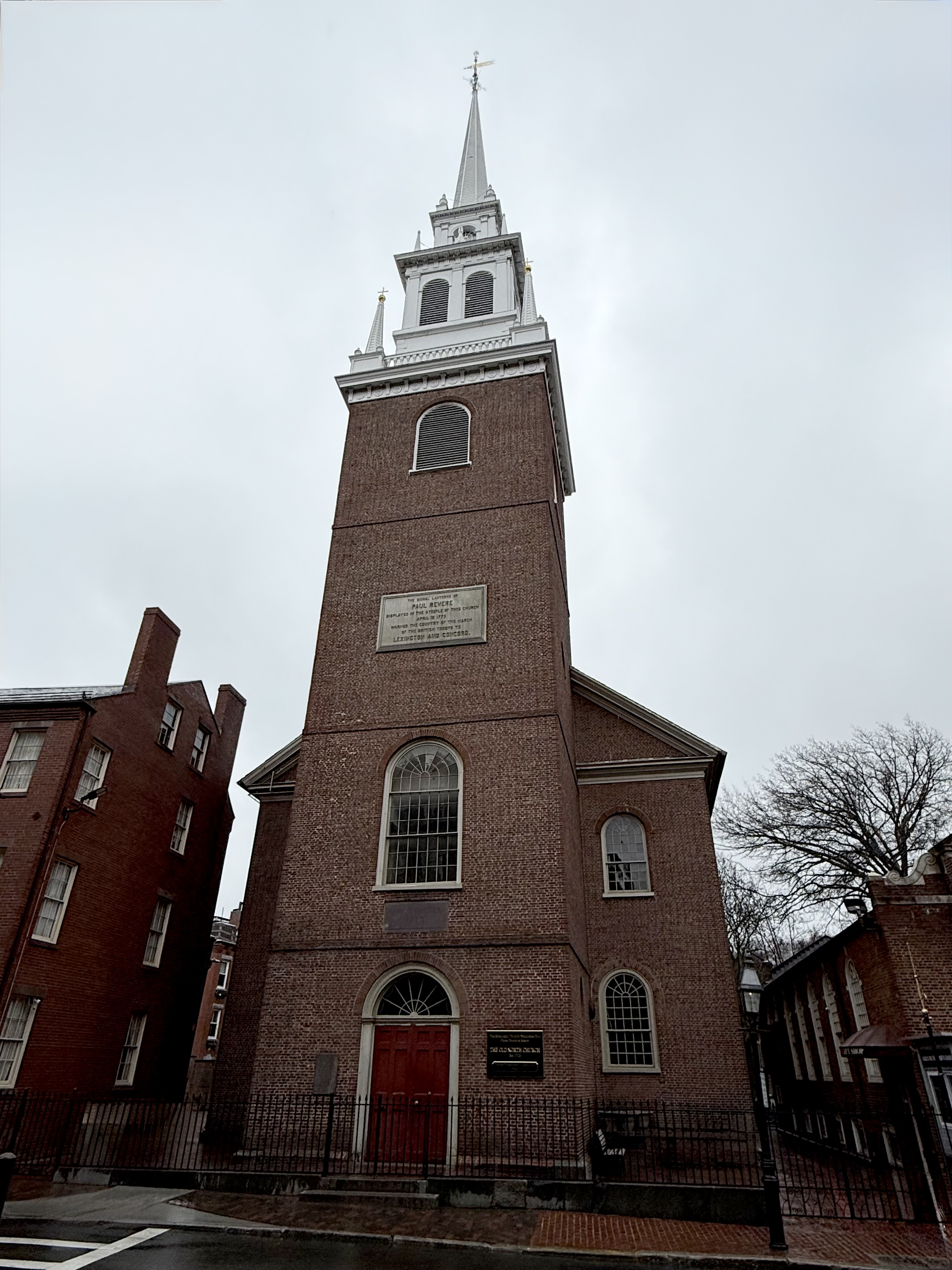
- Old North Church in 2025
- Old North Church
- 42°21′59″N 71°3′16″W
- Location: Boston, Massachusetts
- Address: 191–193 Salem Street
- Country: United States
- Denomination: Episcopal
- Website: www.oldnorth.com

History
- Founded: 1723
- Dedicated: December 29, 1723

Architecture
- Architect(s): Anthony Blount, William Price (advisors)
- Architectural type: Georgian
- Groundbreaking: April 15, 1723
- Completed: 1726

Administration
- Diocese: Diocese of Massachusetts
- Old North Church; Christ Church in the City of Boston
- U.S. National Register of Historic Places
- U.S. National Historic Landmark
- U.S. Historic district – Contributing property
- Boston Landmark
- Built: 1723
- Part of: Boston National Historical Park (ID74002222)
- NRHP reference No.: 66000776

Significant dates
- Added to NRHP: October 15, 1966
- Designated NHL: January 20, 1961
- Designated CP: October 26, 1974
- Designated BOSL: April 22, 2025

Old North Church (officially Christ Church in the City of Boston) is an Episcopal church on Salem Street in the North End neighborhood of Boston, Massachusetts, United States. The church, built in 1723, is the oldest standing church in the city. Old North Church is notable for its role in Paul Revere's midnight ride on April 18, 1775, when two lanterns in the steeple were illuminated, alerting Patriots of British military movements amid the American Revolutionary War. The congregation continues to host services there, while the secular nonprofit Old North Illuminated oversees tourism and preservation efforts. One of the landmarks on Boston's Freedom Trail, the Old North Church is designated a National Historic Landmark and a Boston Landmark, and it is part of the Boston National Historical Park.

Christ Church held its first service on December 29, 1723, becoming Boston's second Anglican congregation. The building was completed in 1726, and additional features, including an organ and steeple, were installed over the two following decades. The church was closed between 1775 and 1778, amid the ongoing war. Among other 19th-century modifications, a new steeple and pews were added in the 1800s, and a rectory and sexton's house were built in 1850. The congregation dwindled during the late 19th century as the owners of pews died or moved out. After taking over the church, the Episcopal Diocese of Massachusetts renovated the building and added a chapel in the 1910s. Further modifications in the 20th century included various commemorative tablets, a new steeple in 1955, and renovations in the 1970s and 1980s. During the 21st century, Old North Illuminated added a gift shop and made additional repairs.

The Georgian-style design was likely influenced by Christopher Wren's London churches. The building has a rectangular nave, flanked by a tower to the west and a semicircular apse to the east. The tower has a belfry with eight change ringing bells cast in 1744, the oldest in North America, along with a steeple rising 191 feet (58 m) above ground. Inside, the church has two levels of pews, along with an organ, a pulpit, and ceiling murals. Below the nave is a crypt where an estimated 1,100 people, such as John Pitcairn and Samuel Nicholson, are interred. The grounds also include the church house at 193–195 Salem Street, the Italian chapel (now a gift shop), and Clough House. The buildings are all connected by paths and gardens. Commentators have described its history as highly significant and its architecture as imposing.

== Site ==
Old North Church (a.k.a. Christ Church) is situated at 191–193 Salem Street (Note: MassLive.com gives an address of 191 Salem Street. The Boston Landmarks Commission cites the church itself as being at 191 Salem Street and its church house as being at 193 Salem Street. Other sources, including the church's website, list the church itself as being at 193 Salem Street.) in the North End of Boston in Massachusetts, United States. It has frontage on Salem Street to the west and Unity Street to the east bordering Salem Court on the south. When the site was acquired in 1722, it had frontages of 59.5 ft (18.1 m) to the west, 121 ft (37 m) to the north, 58 ft (18 m) to the east, and 111 ft (34 m) to the south. The plot covers 16,062 square feet (1,492.2 m^{2}), with irregular borders. The Old North Church complex consists primarily of four buildings: the church building, Italian chapel (now gift shop), vicarage, and Clough House. The complex also includes the church office and parish office, located in neighboring rowhouses on Salem Street.

The complex has multiple gardens, which flank the church to the north and south, surrounded by an iron fence. The 18th Century Garden, containing plants from that era, is at the rear (eastern) end of the church, near Clough House to the southeast. Next to it is the Memorial Garden, dedicated in 2007; it has dog tags commemorating Americans killed in Middle Eastern wars, along with a plaque and wreath commemorating British and British Commonwealth victims of these wars. Along Salem Court (next to the gift shop) is the St. Francis Garden, dating from the 1970s and commemorating the gift shop's former use as an Italian chapel. The northern side of the complex contains the Washington Memorial Garden, dating from the 1920s; it consists of a square garden and memorial plaques, surrounded by a brick wall. Next to it is the Third Lantern Garden, created to commemorate a lantern illuminated by U.S. President Gerald Ford in 1975. Brick paths connect the complex's buildings, and there is a brick stairway along the primary west–east path.

The Old North Church complex is surrounded by low- to mid-rise residential or commercial buildings. Paul Revere Mall extends southeast of the church and Unity Street, running to Hanover Street, and contains an equestrian statue of Paul Revere. The church is a stop on the Freedom Trail, a path connecting historic sites in Boston; sequentially, it is between the Paul Revere House and Copp's Hill Burying Ground.

== History ==
=== 18th century ===
The Old North Church is an Episcopal congregation formed as Christ Church in 1723. Its colloquial name – "Old North" – originally referred to the Second Church, a Puritan congregation from 1649. Christ Church was the second Anglican church in the town of Boston, after King's Chapel, and was founded in response to overcrowding at King's Chapel. In 1722, Anthony Blount of the King's Chapel congregation paid Nathaniel Henchman £100 for a land property in the North End, upon which Christ Church was to be built. The site, situated inland from Boston Harbor and away from the existing meetinghouses, was less expensive than comparably sized lots in other parts of town. It also sat on higher land than any of Boston's other churches; the surrounding land, at the time, was being developed with speculative rowhouses.

==== Development ====
Christ Church's congregation collected subscriptions from late 1722 to early 1723, with which they built a brick structure with a nave and tower. Ebenezer Clough and James Varney were the stonemasons, while Thomas Bennett and Thomas Tippin were the carpenters. Blount, an architectural advisor for the congregation, was heavily involved with the project until his death c. 1726 – c. 1727. Excavation of the cellar began in April 1723, and the cornerstone was laid on April 15 by King's Chapel rector Samuel Myles. The nave's columns were being installed by July, and windows from London were being imported the next month. Bricks were obtained from Medford, Massachusetts, and timber was sourced from York, Maine. In September 1723, Timothy Cutler arrived in Boston to become the congregation's first rector, serving for 42 years. Jason Haven had been called to minister, but his parishioners at the First Church and Parish in Dedham convinced him to stay. Work accelerated following Cutler's arrival.

The congregation held its first service on December 29, 1723, with a sermon where Cutler said: "For mine house shall be called a house of prayer for all people." Christ Church initially had 80 families in its congregation and received aid from the Society for the Propagation of the Gospel in Foreign Parts (SPG). Black people, both free and enslaved, were relegated to the upper gallery. Many furnishings, including the pulpit and pews, were temporary. In place of the current windows on the western wall, there were initially doors, which led to the nave's side aisles. Christ Church, as with Church of England congregations in Boston, did not receive funding from the Province of Massachusetts Bay, so the congregation had to raise its own money. As such, the congregation solicited large gifts or subscriptions, and it sold pews. These sales raised £1,230 from forty-five owners, who could vote on congregational matters and customize their pews. Before the American Revolution, both pro-British Loyalists and pro-independence Patriots worshipped at Christ Church, although there were substantially more Loyalists than Patriots. The Washington Post retrospectively wrote that the church endured despite being "barely tolerated" by the majority-Puritan population.

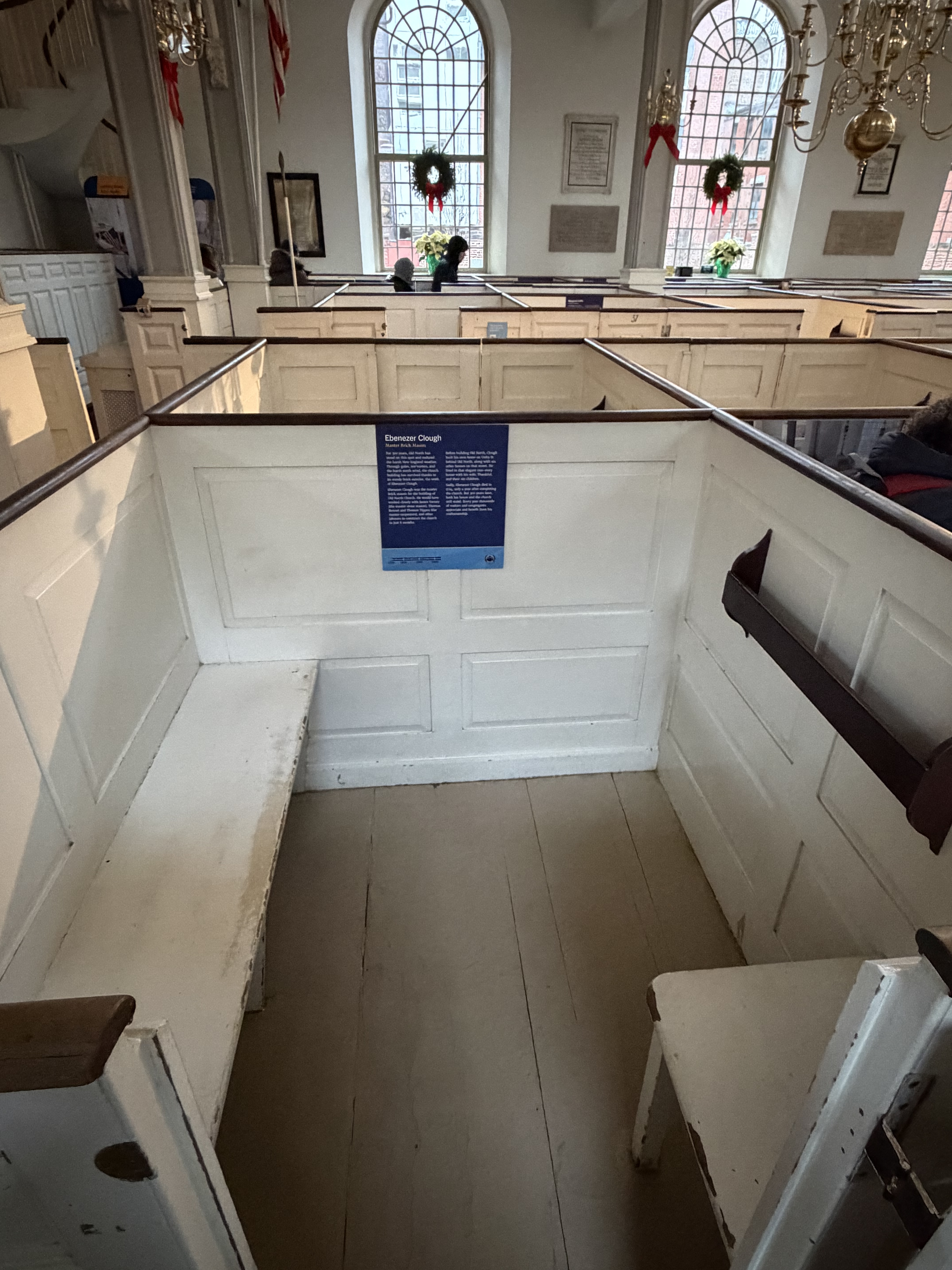
The original pews were installed in 1725–1726.

Nearly from the outset, Christ Church was informally known as the "North Church". The parish of Christ Church was organized on April 6, 1724, and construction continued in stages for two more years. By early 1724, workers were installing trim and interior decorations, and they were installing pews in the upper gallery, along with staircases leading to these seats. The church's tower was completed that June, with a pyramidal wooden roof and an entrance providing access to the nave's central aisle. Additional work that year included an interior stairway for the tower, a pulpit canopy, and ceiling decorations. Two brass chandeliers were hung from the ceiling, and South Carolina colonial governor Francis Nicholson donated cedar planks for an altarpiece. During 1725, workers added woodwork trim and covered the walls in plaster, and the congregation added 58 pews to the main floor. An additional 24 pews in the galleries were ordered in 1726. Following the pew installations, the church's original design was complete. Work continued for years afterward, and some additions, such as an organ, would not be added for more than a decade.

==== Late 1720s to early 1770s ====
Additional changes to the building were led by William Price, a vestryman who oversaw nearly all modifications in the church's first two decades. During the late 1720s, he decorated the interior with details such as rusticated columns and decorative curtains. John Gibbs, a congregant, was then hired to paint cherubs inside. Gibbs painted the galleries, columns, organ case, apse, and chandeliers, along with the woodwork. Richard Avery built a clock for the interior, while Bennett built the clock case. Temporary benches were installed in the western gallery, and the first vestry room was replaced by a wooden room. An altar was completed in 1730, and the second pulpit had been added to the eastern wall. The pulpit was hourglass-shaped and divided into a gallery-level deck, a reader's desk below it, and a clerk's desk at the bottom. The basement was converted to a tomb in 1732. Gibbs further modified the nave's columns during that decade, adding fluting and giving them a marble-like appearance. By the mid-1730s, the congregation was discussing adding a clock for the church's as-yet-unbuilt spire.

The church received its first organ in 1736 or 1737, and the organ loft was decorated simultaneously. An additional site measuring 20 feet (6.1 m) wide was acquired from John Baker in 1737. That year, church leaders also began a subscription campaign to collect the remaining funds needed to construct the first spire, which was completed in August 1740. After the congregation raised funds for new bells, they ordered a set of change ringing bells, which were installed in 1745. The British maritime captain Thomas Gruchy, a pew owner, donated four angel sculptures to the church in 1746, having plundered them from a French vessel. Gruchy also gave Christ Church a chandelier, which was later given to one of Old North's mission churches. By mid-century, the congregation had 800 worshippers.

In the early 1750s, a clock was affixed to the spire, and the congregants bought an additional site from Thomas Greenough, measuring 40 by 84 feet (12 by 26 m). The spire underwent minor repairs in 1756. The congregation installed a second organ in 1759, which took the place of the original. This organ was built by Thomas Johnston, who had been hired seven years earlier but had not been paid because of monetary shortfalls. James Greaton was also hired as an assistant reverend, taking over as the rector for two years after Cutler died in 1765. In 1768, Mather Byles took over as the rector. The British Parliament closed the port of Boston in 1774; with trade stalled, the congregation could not source the funds needed to pay Byles, who would flee Massachusetts shortly after. The congregation stopped convening in April 1775, and with the onset of the American Revolution, it stopped receiving support from the SPG.

==== American Revolution ====
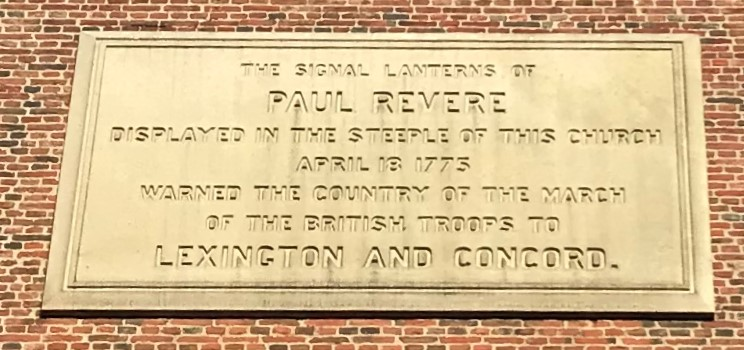
A plaque on the front of the church, describing the actions of Paul Revere in 1775

Amid the American Revolutionary War, on April 18, 1775, Paul Revere directed that lanterns be hung in the steeple, warning other patriots in Charlestown (across the Charles River) about the movements of the British Army. The act is variously credited to sexton Robert Newman and sea captain John Pulling; some sources credit both men with having lit the lanterns together. Revere also planned to cross the river and notify patriots of the army's movements personally, but the lanterns were intended as a contingency if this were not possible. One lantern was to be used to notify Charlestown's sentry in case the British Army marched over Boston Neck and the Great Bridge, while two were to be used in case they arrived via boat on the Charles River. Ultimately, two lanterns were hung; they were taken down within two minutes to minimize the risk of British exposure.

Revere and William Dawes later delivered the same message in person to patriots in Lexington. After receiving the signal, the Charlestown Patriots also sent a rider to Lexington, but this rider did not reach his destination, and his identity is unknown. Henry Wadsworth Longfellow's 1860 poem "Paul Revere's Ride", which mythologized the midnight ride, led Christ Church to be associated with the phrase "One if by land, and two if by sea". The "sea" was some distance away and was mentioned only for poetic effect, and Longfellow's poem erroneously claimed that Revere himself saw the lanterns. One original lantern survives at the Concord Museum.

There has been dispute over whether Christ Church or the Second Church was the "Old North Church" involved in Revere's ride. In 1901, Alexander Corbett Jr. of the Boston Daily Globe wrote that the lights would have been displayed from Christ Church because it was higher than the Second Church. The historian Mary Kent Davey Babcock wrote in 1947 that it would have been impossible to see any light from the Second Church because it had no steeple. Corbett and Babcock both wrote that the Second Church was known as the "Old North Meeting House", whereas Christ Church was called "North Church", a name Revere explicitly used in later correspondence about the ride. By contrast, Second Church minister John Nicholls Booth claimed that Christ Church had been affiliated with Loyalists (unlike the Patriot-affiliated Second Church) and that Christ Church's higher location made it too conspicuous for it to be the lanterns' location. Kevin White, a later mayor of Boston, said that Christ Church was still revered for its symbolism regardless of whether it had been associated with Revere.

==== Post-American Revolution ====
Christ Church remained closed for three years, during which Robert Newman, the church's sexton, continued to ring the bells twice a day. The bells could no longer be pealed to create melodies; instead, they were chimed, creating a sound similar to an immovable bell. The church reopened in August 1778 with Stephen Lewis as the rector. The damaged exterior walls were covered in clapboard in the mid-1780s, and the spire was repaired again. Lewis served as rector until 1784 and was replaced by William Montague two years later. Montague was himself succeeded in 1792 by William Walter, and that year the congregation began heating the building with stoves during the winter. Walter died after eight years.

=== 19th century ===
==== 1800s to 1850s ====
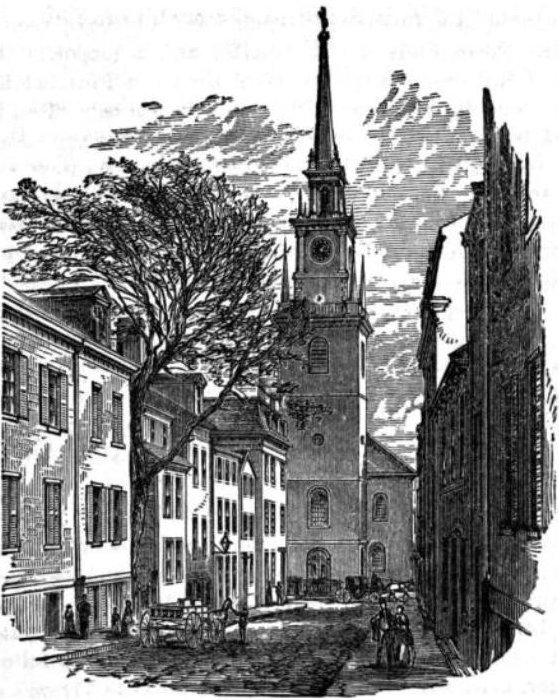
A c. 1882 illustration of Old North Church showing the second (1806) steeple

Samuel Haskell became rector in 1801; the Greenough plot was auctioned off that year, and Jonathan Merry built a house there. The next year, the vestry voted to unify the pews' designs, which previously had been built to custom standards. Haskell resigned in 1803, possibly in displeasure with his meager salary, and was replaced that year by Asa Eaton. The original steeple of Christ Church was destroyed by a hurricane on October 9, 1804, when a gust blew the wooden spire from the tower; it was replaced by a new spire two years later. Unlike the first steeple, its replacement did not have a clock, a situation that continued for a half-century. Also in 1806, the box pews were replaced with slip pews to accommodate the growing congregation, and the central aisle was eliminated as a result. New staircases to the galleries were built, requiring the closure of the western elevation's side entrances. The doorway on the nave's western wall was rebuilt, and a stove was also added to the nave's eastern end. The chancel remained in place. Some gallery pews were modified for black congregants, and some seating was open to the public on a first-come, first-served basis.

In 1812, congregant Shubael Bell gave the church a painting of the Last Supper by John Penniman, which was installed within a new altarpiece. This required relocating the pulpit and a sounding board above it to the northern wall. The Salem Street Academy, a Sunday school for children partially owned by Christ Church, opened in 1813 to the north of the main church. Bell donated a marble sculpture of U.S. President George Washington in 1815. (Note: One source gives a different date of 1813.) After 1820, area residents gradually started worshipping at St. Paul's Church rather than Christ Church, while Irish and later Jewish immigrants moved into the North End. William M. Goodrich refurbished the organ during that decade. (Note: Mary Kent Davey Babcock described the organ as having been replaced completely, but Old North's website states that the Johnston organ remains in place, albeit with heavy reconstruction.) Following Eaton's resignation, William Croswell became Christ Church's rector in 1829.

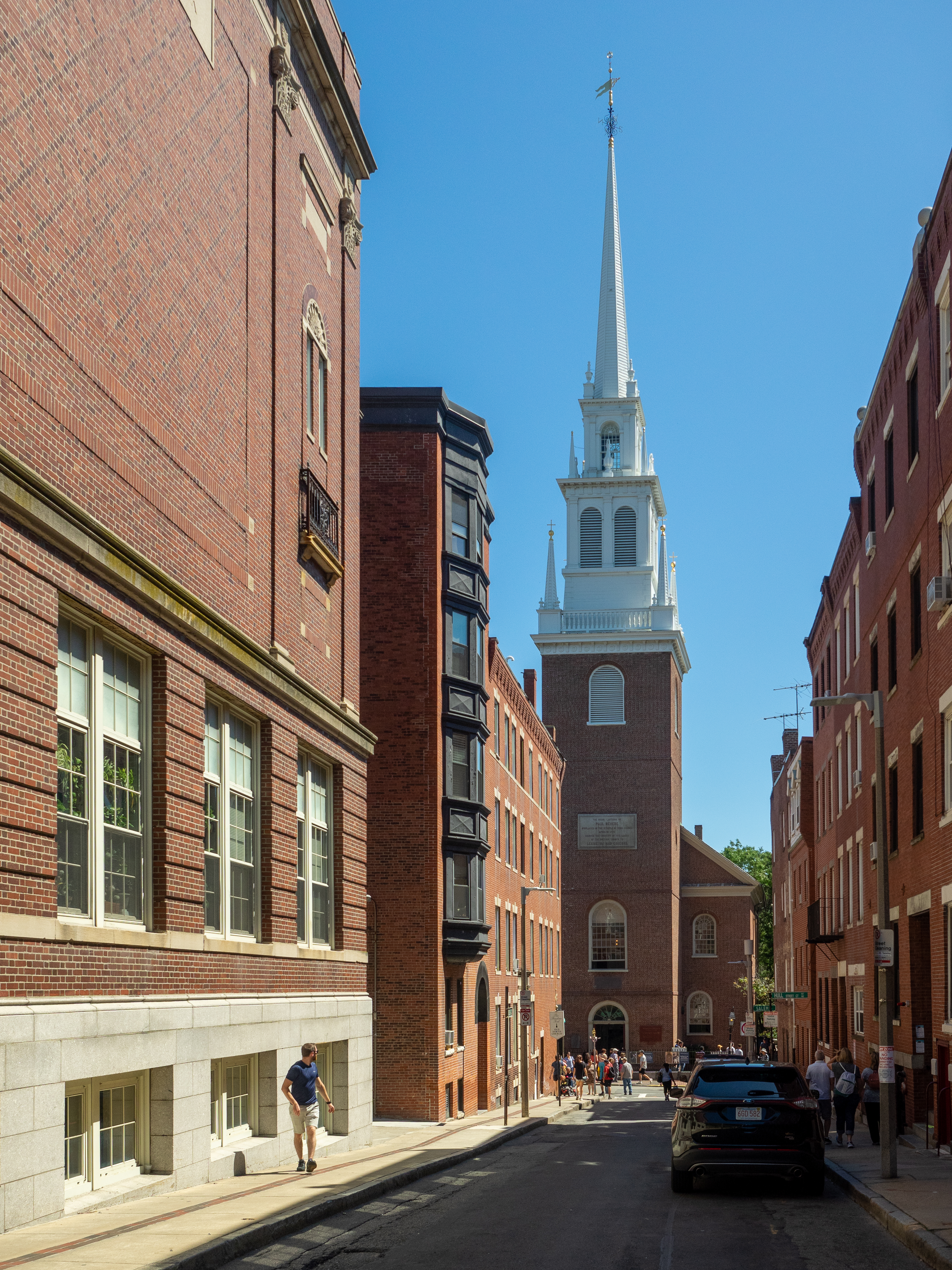
The church building viewed from the west

The interior underwent a major repair during 1830. This work required closing the church for two months, and a celebratory hymn was written when it reopened. Two stoves were added, one each flanking the doorway on the western side of the nave. The nave was repainted white, and decaying portions of the interior were replaced. A new pulpit was installed within the chancel. A skylit half-dome and a plaster wall were added to the apse, closing off part of it. Thomas Clark added a third seating level to the nave's west wall, flanking the organ, in 1831; this gallery was intended for children attending Sunday school. The facade was repaired in 1834, and a Sunday school building and vestry were completed at that time. The weathervane was also regilded.

After a decade as rector, Croswell was replaced in 1840 by John Woart. During Woart's tenure, pew owners who prayed at other churches were exempted from paying dues on pews. The steeple was repaired extensively in 1847, and the bell mechanism was repaired afterward. In 1850, the Salem Street Academy was demolished, and a rectory was built on Salem Street, with a sexton's house behind it. The rectory was originally named the Hay House, after a woman who had first offered to fund the house three decades prior. After the end of Woart's tenure in 1852, William T. Smithett became the rector. The "Smithett controversy" ensued shortly after Smithett joined, involving several lawsuits. Smithett had attempted to sell unused pews, to the displeasure of Elias Goddard and William Parrott, two of the church's wardens. This led to a physical confrontation, a riot, and the replacement of Parrott and Goddard; legal disputes over the pews continued until 1857. Also in the mid-1850s, the slate roof was replaced, and the steeple was rebuilt after a fire.

==== 1860s to 1890s ====
Smithett was succeeded in 1861 by John T. Burrell, who lived in the rectory; he was the last minister to do so for six decades. Henry Burroughs replaced Burrell in 1868, and the pulpit was moved to the chancel's south wall shortly afterward. A clock was added to the steeple in 1869 or 1870, covering up windows there. The church building underwent some repairs and modifications in the mid-1870s; the interior was repainted, a robing room was built, and the walls were covered with frescoes. In 1876, a city commission was appointed to study whether Christ Church or the Second Church had been featured in Revere's midnight ride. After two years of deliberation, a plaque commemorating Revere's ride was installed at Christ Church. The vestry building was also expanded to two floors in 1878.

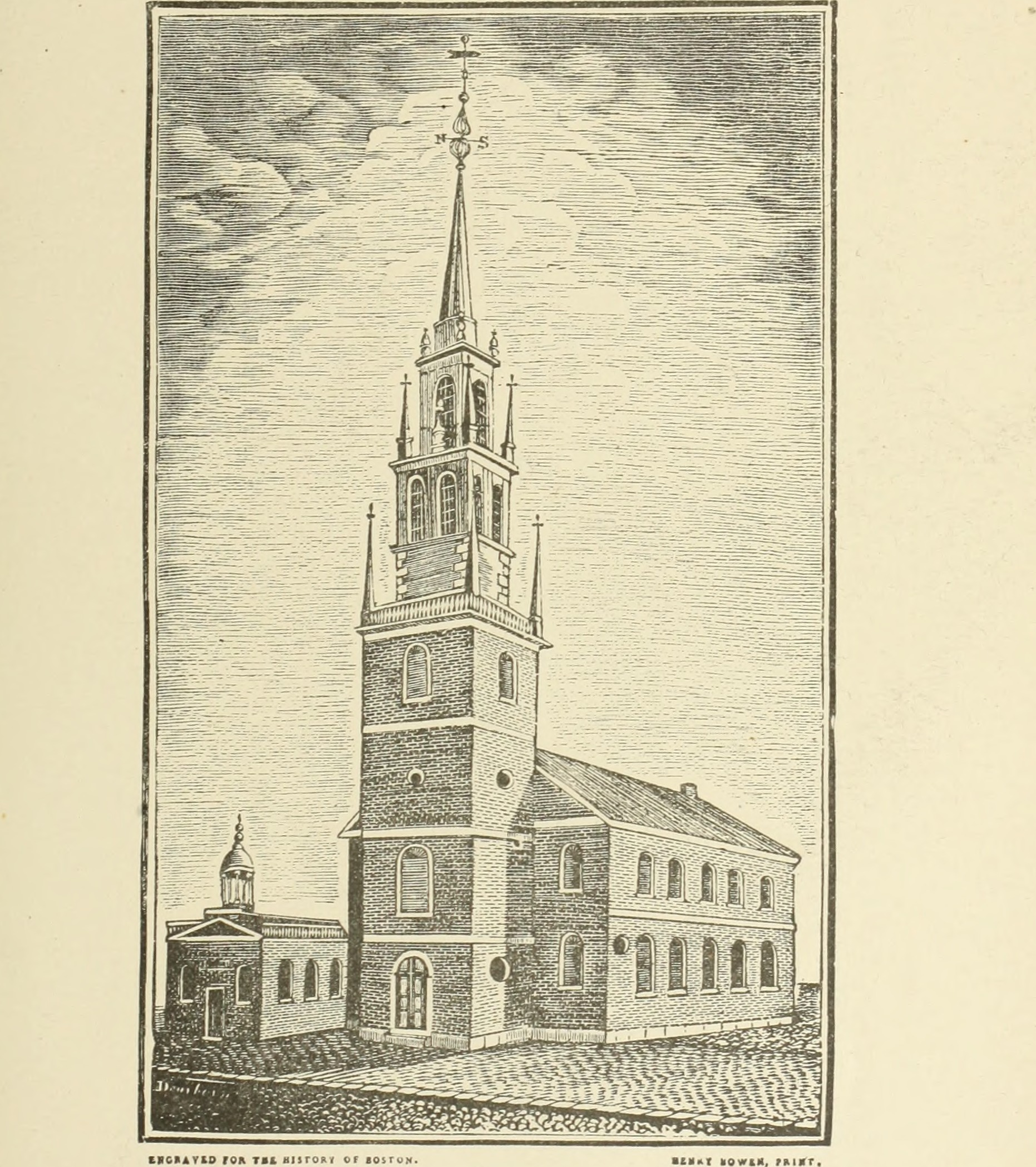
Depiction of the church in 1882

William H. Munroe took over the rectorship in 1882, serving until his death a decade later. The building underwent renovations in 1884, reopening that November after an $8,000 refurbishment. (Note: Equivalent to $241,000 in 2025) The robing room was removed, the organ was expanded, and the steeple was refurbished again. Henry Van Brunt redesigned the interior that year, which included repainting, adding new carpets, and redecorating pews. Through the 19th century, the original pew owners had been moving out, to be replaced by newly arrived immigrants. Other congregants had died, and there were fewer and fewer new congregants. New congregants did not own pews, as the remaining pew owners had refused to sell the vacant pews. This prevented the Episcopal Diocese of Massachusetts from taking over the church's operation.

By the early 1890s, there were 11 remaining pew owners, and the building was decaying. Charles W. Duane became the rector in 1893; the Boston Daily Globe wrote that he frequently preached to "almost empty pews". The bells were rebuilt shortly afterward, allowing them to be pealed again, but they soon deteriorated and could only be chimed. Later that decade, the congregation began raising money and repaint the exterior and repair the steeple, and it also started charging visitors admission. By then, the nave was painted pink, and there were 210 students in the Sunday school. The rear of the church was damaged in an 1899 fire, after which the facade was repaired and the steeple underwent refurbishment.

=== 20th century ===
==== 1900s and 1910s ====
By the early 20th century, Christ Church (more commonly known as Old North) was Boston's oldest congregation still occupying its original building. The Daughters of the American Revolution and the Paul Revere Chapter met there regularly, and tourists traveled there because of its association with Revere's ride. The congregation retained as many of the original decorations as possible, making repairs only when necessary, while the exterior brickwork was deteriorating. Duane resigned in 1907, and the Sunday school was discontinued that year after enrollment declined to six children. Duane continued to serve unofficially until 1909, when he departed permanently. A state legislator proposed in 1910 that the Massachusetts government acquire the church and operate it as a monument, but was unsuccessful. A plan to convert the building to a library was also unsuccessful. By then, the church's worshippers consisted mostly of tourists, and it rarely held events outside of Sunday ceremonies and choir recitals. The surrounding neighborhood was increasingly Italian and predominantly Roman Catholic.

Bishop William Lawrence, the congregation's interim rector, wanted to abolish pew ownership, but the remaining pew owners initially refused. After the deaths of several pew owners in 1911, the remaining pew owners agreed to his plans. The diocese took over operation from the pew owners. Lawrence raised $32,000 for the church's endowment (Note: Equivalent to $803,000 in 2025) and $36,000 for repairs, (Note: Equivalent to $903,000 in 2025) and he discontinued the admission fee for visitors. Lawrence announced plans for renovation in October 1911, and work began the following July. R. Clipson Sturgis and Henry C. Ross designed the project, which included replacing the original floor timbers and gallery stairs, and removing the upper gallery. The box pews were also reconstructed, the interior woodwork was repainted white, and the chancel's paneling was restored. Two commemorative tablets were mounted to the walls. A pulpit based on that at Newport's Trinity Church was commissioned, while the apse was returned to its original size. Outside, the clapboard cladding was removed, and the exterior paint was sandblasted away, revealing the facade's original color. The vestry in the rear was demolished, along with the abandoned Sunday school. The sexton's house also underwent repairs.

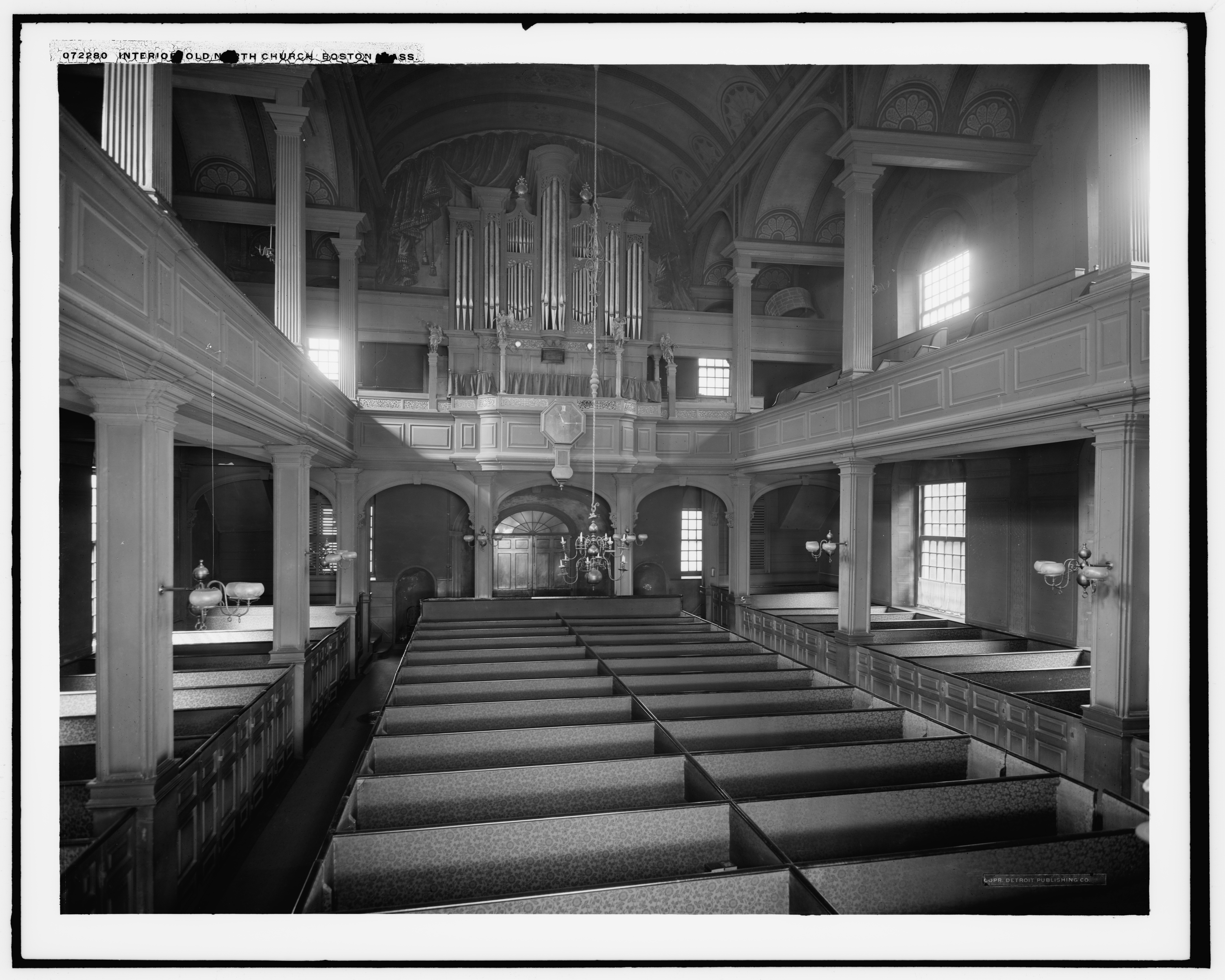
Interior of Christ Church, showing box pews added in the 1912 renovation

The church reopened December 29, 1912, the 189th anniversary of its first service. The Daily Item predicted that the building, having been restored to its 1775 appearance, would "become more popular than ever". After the renovation, pew ownerships could no longer be bequeathed; existing pew owners retained their pews under a grandfather clause. Revere's descendants began fundraising for repairs to the steeple in 1913. During the mid-1910s, the congregation installed tablets inside, memorializing Thomas Johnston and congregant Samuel Nicholson, and a tablet outside, memorializing British soldiers who died in the Battle of Bunker Hill. William H. DeWart began serving as rector in 1914. He devised plans for a chapel for local Italian Waldensians and began hosting Italian-language services that year. The Waldensians originally prayed at the rector's house, 195 Salem Street; the congregation laid the cornerstone of the Italian chapel in 1917. The chapel, known as the Chapel of St. Francis of Assisi, cost $15,000 (Note: Equivalent to $213,000 in 2025) and required the demolition of the Merry house. The chapel was dedicated on November 26, 1918. DeWart's plans to acquire and demolish surrounding tenement buildings were postponed due to World War I.

==== 1920s to mid-1950s ====
Celebrations for the church's bicentennial lasted a full year. In 1923, artifacts were dedicated and placed into the church building's entrance, the organ was restored, and a tablet memorializing aviator John Childs was installed. Another tablet commemorating Robert Newman was added the next year, and a city commission voted to swap out the Revere plaque on the tower's facade. The belfry was also illuminated by electric lights for the first time. DeWart served until 1926 and was succeeded by Ernest J. Dennen. To attract visitors and parishioners, Dennen began emphasizing the church's patriotic connotations, operated a shuttle bus to Boston Common, and launched Sunday afternoon services. During Dennen's tenure, the nondenominational Lantern League was established to help preserve the building, and tour guides were hired for the first time. The congregation also began raising funds to replace the deteriorating roof. Dennen resigned in 1929 due to disagreements over the parish's policies.

Francis E. Webster was appointed as rector in 1930. By then, the Lantern League sought to acquire and demolish neighboring tenements, saying they posed a fire hazard. The league launched a $100,000 beautification campaign in 1934, (Note: Equivalent to $1,880,000 in 2025) acquiring and demolishing several buildings. The Boston government also cleared land on the Unity Street side, creating a park (later known as Paul Revere Park). As part of the campaign, the congregation dedicated a tablet commemorating the signing of the U.S. Constitution, and it added a water screen to the belfry. The Lantern League's campaign was completed in 1938, and the group ordered additional tablets memorializing the Battles of Lexington and Concord and the signing of the U.S. Declaration of Independence. As part of a reorganization of the parish's operations the next year, the position of rector was changed to vicar. By the 1940s, the church had nearly 80,000 annual visitors, although this number declined by more than 50% during World War II. Webster died in 1941 and was succeeded by William P. Hatch. Modifications during the decade included the installation of a tablet commemorating William Lawrence and the demolition of the 19th-century sexton's house.

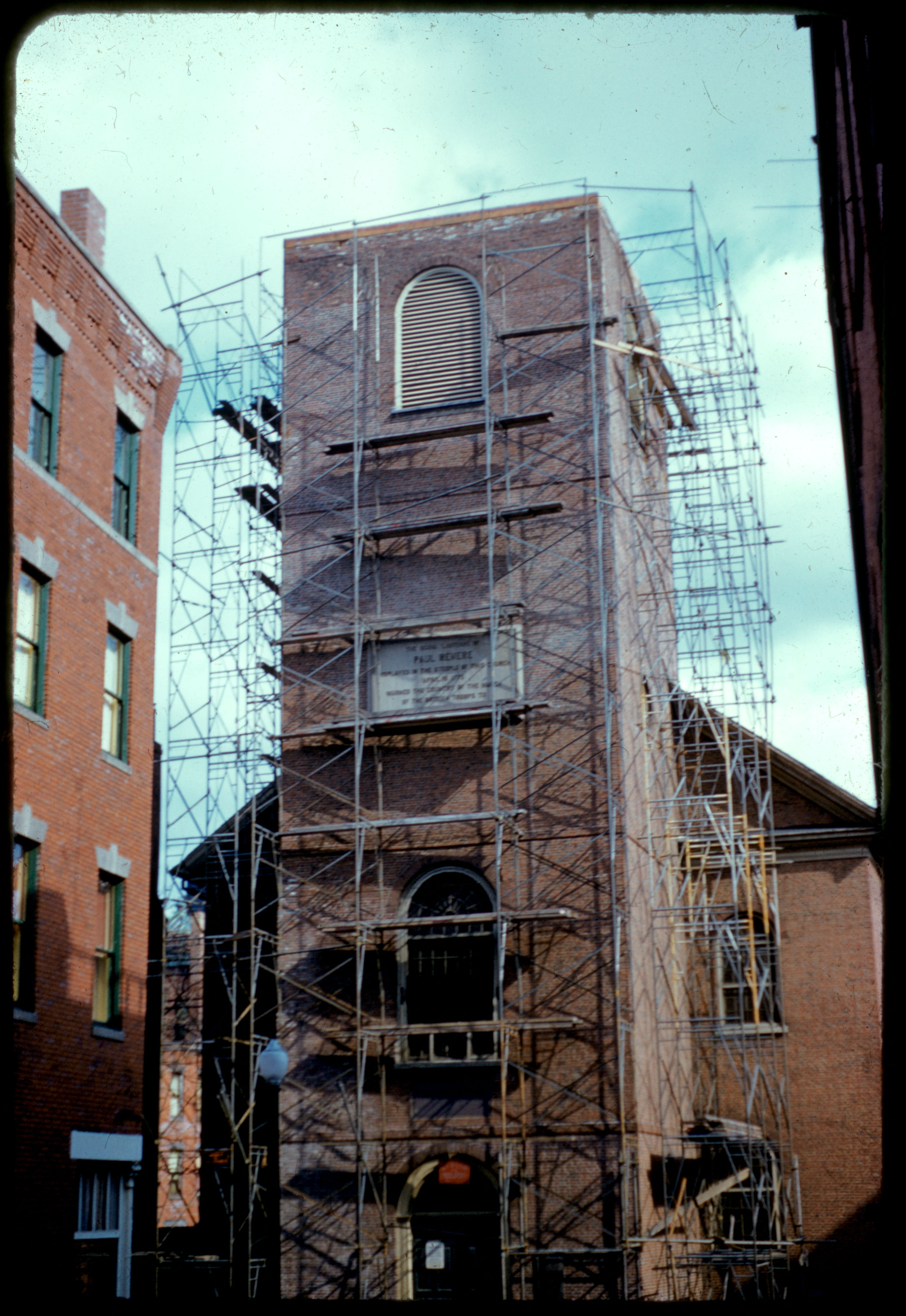
The steeple being replaced in 1955

Charles Peck replaced Hatch as vicar in 1946, and the same year, the diocese's bishop, Henry Knox Sherrill, formed an organization to keep the congregation solvent. By then, only 30 to 40 regular worshippers remained, commuting from suburbs as far as Waltham. A fire-alarm system was installed in 1952, by which the church tower's walls were crumbling. The congregation began raising $100,000 to repair the steeple (Note: Equivalent to $960,000 in 2025) but could not raise the required funds. After the steeple fell during Hurricane Carol on August 31, 1954, Peck deferred his retirement to oversee its reconstruction, The congregation sought to raise $150,000 from across the U.S., (Note: Equivalent to $1,425,000 in 2025) and three fundraising campaigns were formed. Charles R. Strickland was hired to design the new steeple, which was installed in July 1955. After the steeple was dedicated that October, Peck resigned the same month.

==== Late 1950s to 1990s ====
Howard P. Kellett took over in 1956 and served for 15 years. Old North hosted its first-ever midnight Communion service shortly after Kellett joined, and seven surrounding structures were demolished and replaced with gardens. The organ was repaired in 1957–1958, and the congregation acquired the neighboring Clough House in 1959. Women's clubs raised money for the house's restoration, and they helped plant the church's new gardens. The organ, having been converted into electric operation at some point, was converted back into a mechanically operated organ that year. A plaque honoring Methodist reverend Charles Wesley was dedicated along the church's facade in 1961. An artwork of Revere by William Robinson Leigh was donated to the congregation the next year. After beetle infestations were discovered in the woodwork, the building underwent repairs in 1966, which cost $40,000. (Note: Equivalent to $303,000 in 2025) By 1969, evening services had been suspended due to neighborhood crime. The church had 500,000 yearly visitors, but the congregation struggled to fund nonessential expenses.

Robert Golledge, who became vicar in 1971, announced plans to restore the bells for the United States Bicentennial. At the time, the congregation had no organist or bell ringer. The church celebrated its 250th anniversary in 1973. Renovations, including repairs to the steeple and exterior walkways, were undertaken in 1975, and the long-dormant bells were reactivated. During a visit that year, U.S. President Gerald Ford lit a third lantern at Old North Church; a replica of this lantern was displayed in the steeple, adjoining the two existing lanterns. Queen Elizabeth II lit another lantern when she visited for the U.S. Bicentennial in 1976, and an archive was dedicated at the church that year.

By the early 1980s, the congregation was raising $100,000 to restore the bells, as the belfry and bell mechanisms had deteriorated. Although the bells themselves were in good shape, they were still not regularly rung. The bells were removed for replacement in March 1983 and reinstalled that August. Further restoration took place in the late 1980s, including beetle extermination. Preservation activities were delegated to the secular Old North Foundation (later Old North Illuminated) in 1991. Golledge retired in 1996 and was replaced by Stephen Ayres the next year.

=== 21st century ===
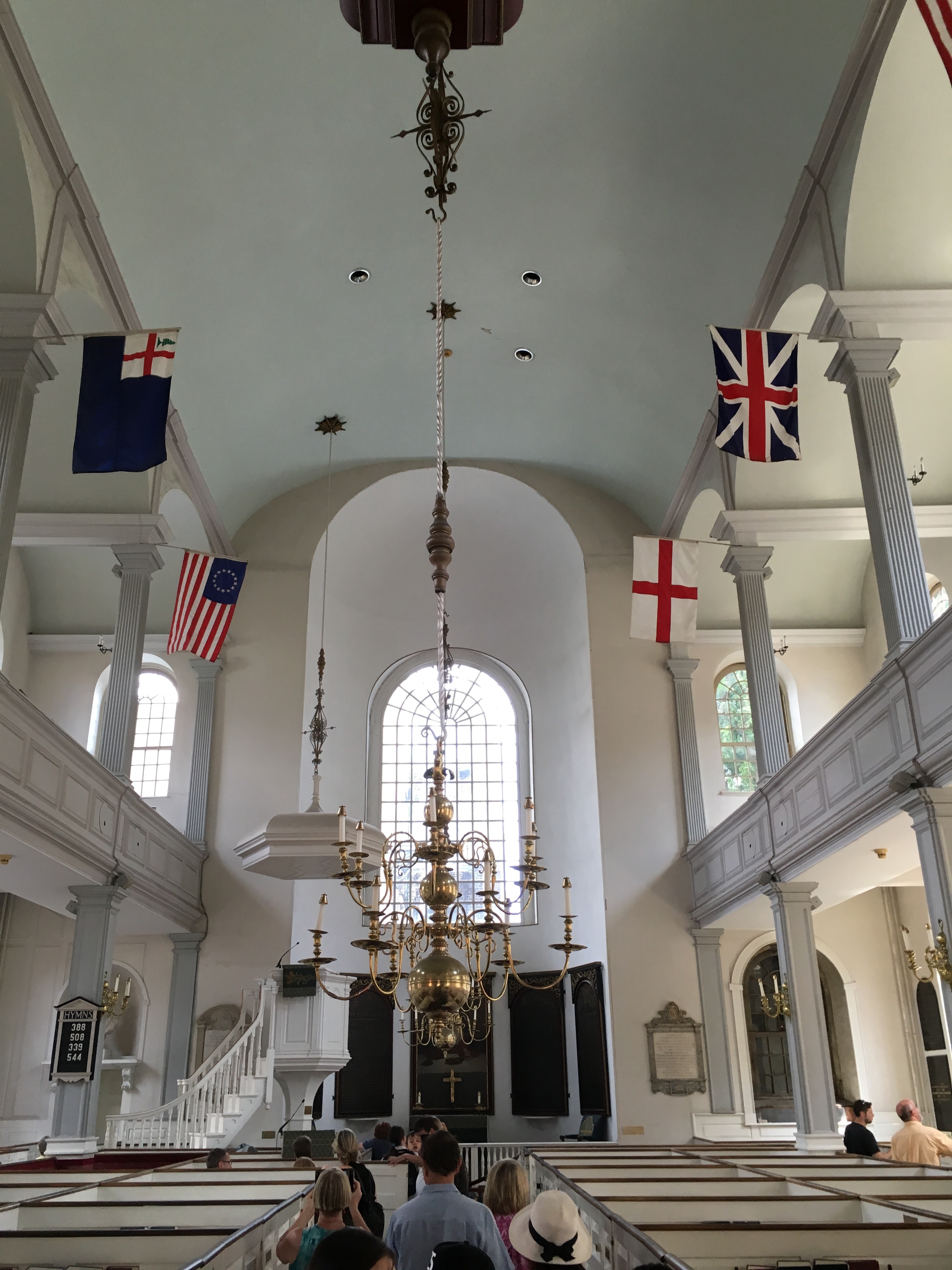
The interior, looking toward the apse on the eastern wall

The church continued to host visitors in the early 21st century, even as it also held services and performed baptisms, weddings, and funerals for congregants. It was the only Episcopal congregation in the North End, whose residents were mostly Catholics. In 2003, the U.S. government gave the church $317,000 for window restoration, bypassing a longstanding prohibition on preservation grants for religious institutions. The following year, Old North restored the building's glass and added a fire alarm system; the congregation also began blessing pets in 2004. The lights were replaced with LEDs in 2008. The Old North Foundation also considered opening the crypt, which, at the time, was generally closed to the public.

In 2013, Old North Illuminated opened Captain Jackson's Chocolate Shop, named after Old North congregant Newark Jackson. Researchers during the 2010s also conducted archeological studies of the church's garden and searched for possible human remains in the soil. After researchers found that Newark Jackson was a slaveowner, Old North Illuminated replaced the shop with a gift shop in the late 2010s. The church began charging admission fees in 2018, as the previous suggested donations had not been raising enough money. At the time, the church needed $500,000 a year in repairs. In addition, in advance of the church's 300th anniversary and to make it compliant with building codes, Old North Illuminated planned an $8 million renovation. After Ayres's resignation in 2019, Matthew Cadwell became vicar the next year. The church was closed between March 2020 and April 2021 due to the COVID-19 pandemic in Massachusetts; Clough House remained closed for another year.

Following the pandemic, Old North Illuminated announced plans to redesign the exhibits, focusing more extensively on the church's history. The organization received a grant for the restoration of the Italian chapel's windows in 2021, and the nave's clock was restored. The Washington Garden was restored the following year. The Old North Church celebrated its 300th anniversary in 2023; the crypt was renovated and repaired, and the exhibit "Sparking Revolutions" opened in the nave. In 2024, the NPS provided $1.7 million for repairs and accessibility projects, and the bust of George Washington was restored. The conservation firm of Gianfranco Pocobene also restored the original interior paint scheme. The church had 250,000 annual visitors by the mid-2020s. Confectioner Ye Olde Pepper Candy Companie opened a pop-up shop in the church in 2026.

== Architecture ==
Old North Church's sanctuary is a Georgian-style building patterned after Christopher Wren's churches in London. It is an early example of a Georgian church in the modern-day U.S. and is Boston's oldest extant church building. There is no clear documentation as to who designed it; a 1961 report failed to find evidence that any source in England was directly consulted for the building's design. Contemporary documents show that Anthony Blount and William Price were the most involved with Old North's construction. The design may have been inspired by a print in Blount's possession, depicting Wren's St James's Church, Piccadilly. Because this print omits several architectural details, the researcher Penelope Batcheler writes that there may have been additional sources of inspiration for the design. The building was also similar to St Ann Blackfriars in London, and the Old South Meeting House in Downtown Boston was built to a similar design.

=== Exterior ===
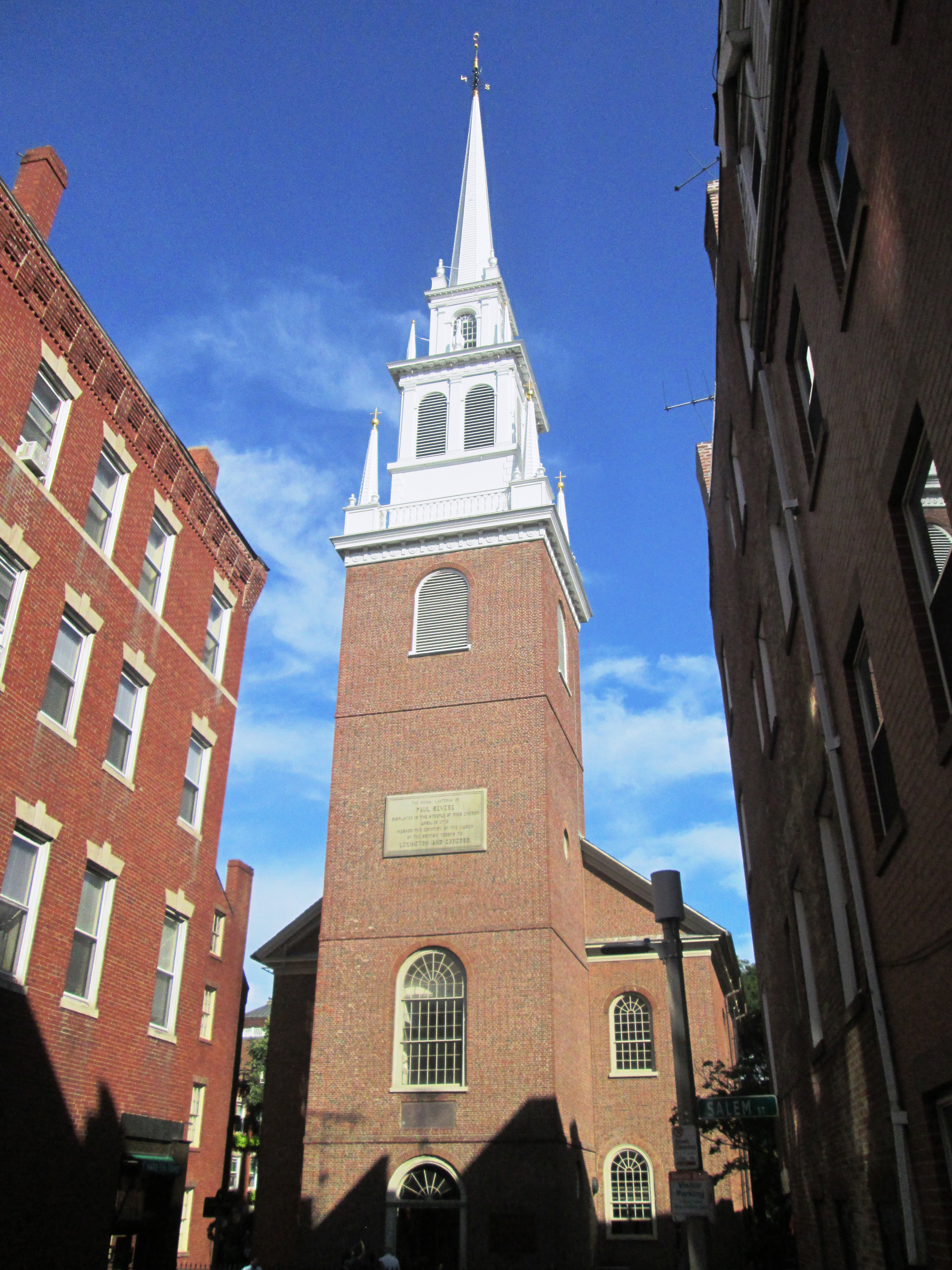
Western elevation, viewed from Hull Street

The main building measures 96.5 by 51.5 feet (29.4 by 15.7 m), fitting the maximum dimensions of the lot with little room to spare. The primary section, the nave, is rectangular with dimensions of about 70 by 51 feet (21 by 16 m), and it measures about 42 feet (13 m) high. (Note: Charles Knowles Bolton gives the same floor dimensions but a differing height of 35 feet (11 m). A plan from 1723 described the building as having floor dimensions of 71 by 51.5 feet (21.6 by 15.7 m). A 1902 Arizona Republican article gives similar floor dimensions of 75 by 50 feet (23 by 15 m), but a vastly different height of 25 feet (7.6 m).) West of the nave is a tower with a smaller, nearly-square footprint, (Note: Sources disagree on whether the tower's ground dimensions were supposed to be 23 by 26 feet (7.0 by 7.9 m), 24 by 24 feet (7.3 by 7.3 m), or 20 by 23.5 feet (6.1 by 7.2 m). Some sources describe the tower as having a square plan.) topped by a steeple or spire. At the east end is a semicircular apse, which measures 20 by 23.5 feet (6.1 by 7.2 m) across. There is also a vestry on the nave's eastern elevation, dating from 1912.

==== Facade ====
The building's foundation walls are made of rubblestone, which extend 7.5 to 11 feet (2.3 to 3.4 m) deep. The tower has a thicker foundation than the rest of the building and has a cellar accessed from an opening in the nave's basement. There are additional openings to the east, which lead to the vestry and directly outdoors. The walls above are made of brick laid in English common bond, generally measuring 2.5 feet (0.76 m) thick. The building has 42 windows with over 2,000 panes, which, for the most part, have metal reinforcing bars and square panes. The original plot was so narrow that doorways could not be added to the nave's northern and southern elevations, so the church is instead accessed from the west. The nave's facade contains two levels of arched sash windows. There are wooden windowsills below and brick lintels above each window. Brick belt courses run horizontally above each story, and the walls are topped by wooden cornices with dentils. The building has a gable roof with slate shingles.

The tower has 3.5-foot-thick (1.1 m) brick walls (Note: The Boston Landmarks Commission describes the tower as having 3-foot-thick (0.91 m) walls rising 100 feet (30 m) to the spire's base. The Arizona Republican cites the tower as rising 85 feet (26 m).) rising four stories. A late-18th-century description of the building described the tower's first story as being in the Tuscan order, the second in the Doric order, and the third in the Ionic order. On the tower's western elevation, the first level contains the main entrance, which is topped by a semicircular lunette. Above are a large window and a plaque commemorating Paul Revere's midnight ride, respectively. Another plaque with the text "Christ Church 1723" is placed on the first-story belt course. The northern and southern elevations have round-arched windows on their first and third levels, and all elevations have wooden louvers on the fourth level. Urns were originally placed on setbacks above each level. There is a large round-arched sash window on the apse's facade.

==== Bells ====
List of bells
Bell number	Tone	Weight (cwt/qr/lb)	Weight equivalent
One	F	5–2–4	620 lb (280 kg)
Two	E	5–2–6	622 lb (282 kg)
Three	D	6–1–3	703 lb (319 kg)
Four	C	7–1–3	815 lb (370 kg)
Five	B♭	7–1–21	833 lb (378 kg)
Six	A	8–1–24	948 lb (430 kg)
Seven	G	10–2–21	1,197 lb (543 kg)
Eight	F	13–3–5	1,545 lb (701 kg)

Just beneath the spire is a belfry with round-arched openings, accessed by 157 or 159 steps. It has eight change ringing bells. Cast in 1744 by Abel Rudhall in Gloucester, England, and hung in 1745, they are the oldest change ringing bells in North America. The individual bells' weights range from 620 to 1,545 pounds (281 to 701 kg), and they range from 4 to 5 feet (1.2 to 1.5 m) in height. Each has a different inscription describing an aspect of the bells' or church's history. The bells can be either chimed (producing a ringing sound similar to fixed or limited-motion bells) or pealed (producing a melody). When they are being chimed, a single bell ringer can sound each bell by pulling on ropes attached to them. When they are being pealed, each bell is rung by a different person, and the whole set can be pealed in 40,320 combinations. Like other change ringing bells, they are attached to a frame and can all be rung "full circle". No records relating to the bells' manufacturing process survive.

The Old North Church's first bell-ringers' guild was founded in 1750; a teenaged Paul Revere was one of the earliest bell ringers. Records from the 18th century indicate that there were numerous restrictions on when and how the bells could be rung. Although the bells are regularly chimed, there have been long periods in which they were not pealed. The Jewell family rang the bells for over nine decades in the 19th and 20th centuries. After the 1912 renovation, British bell-ringers were hired to ring the church's bells, but this practice ceased after local Italians objected. Since 1977, the bells have been pealed twice weekly. The pealing is performed by the Massachusetts Institute of Technology Guild of Bellringers, whose members have included students, professors, librarians, and retirees. The bells are tolled whenever U.S. presidents die. They have also been rung for other special occasions, including the reading of the United States Declaration of Independence, the 1776 announcement of the Stamp Act 1765's repeal, the 1781 surrender of Cornwallis, and the abdication of Wilhelm II in 1918.

==== Steeples ====
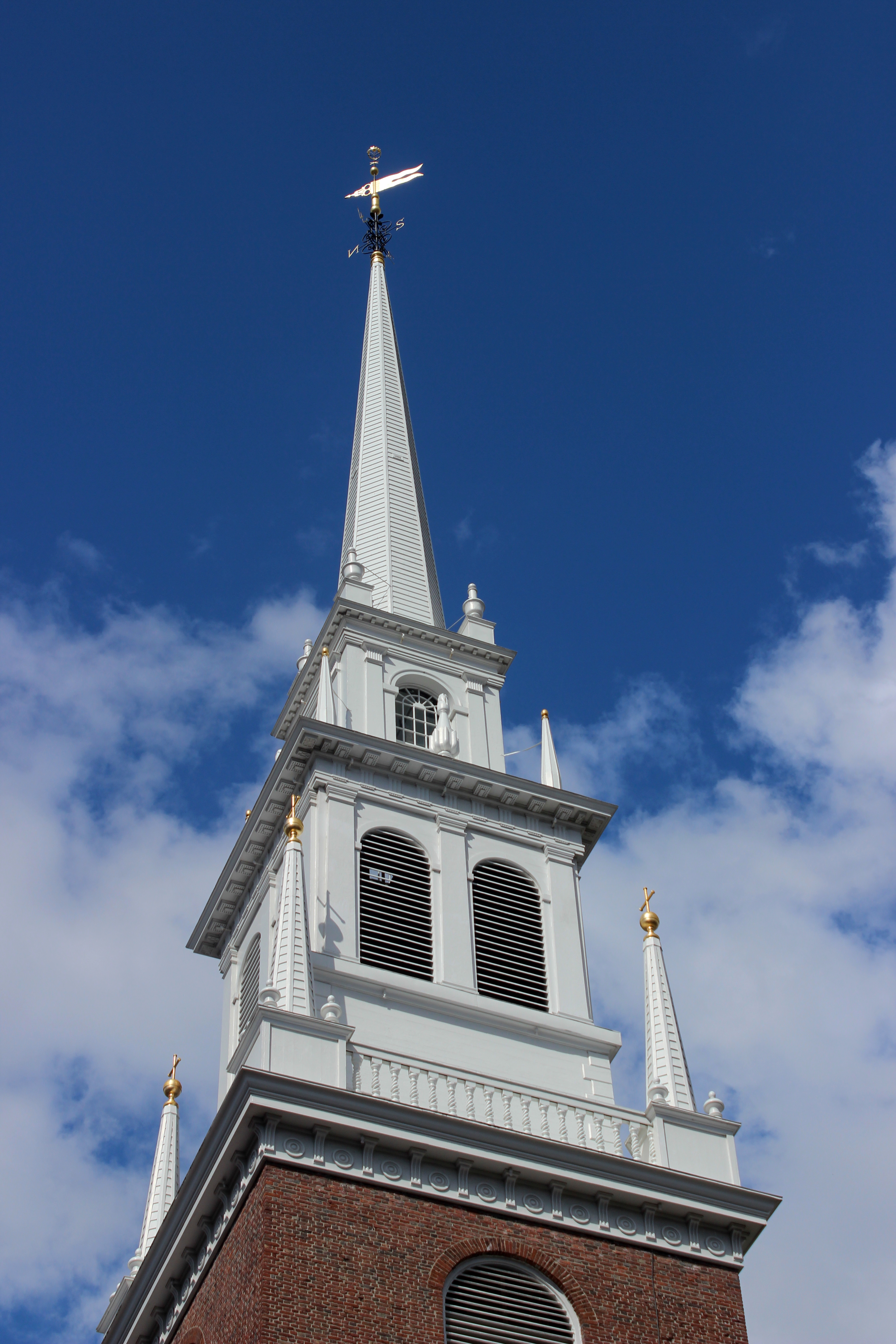
The third steeple was added in 1955 after the second steeple collapsed.

The church has had three steeples in its history. The first, attributed to William Price, was finished in 1740 and had one window. It was topped by a golden weathervane designed by Shem Drowne, bringing its height to 191 feet (58 m). The collapse of the original steeple left only the weathervane and some timbers intact. The second steeple, completed in 1806, is credited to Charles Bulfinch, but a 1981 study failed to find documentation supporting his involvement. It stood 175 feet (53 m) high. From 1870 onward, the second steeple also had a clock with four dials, which sounded the hours whenever the bell was rung. The third steeple, dating from 1955, replaced the second steeple following the latter's collapse. The third steeple is still present as of 2021, making the church 191 feet (58 m) tall. The original weathervane was saved and reinstalled above both of the replacement steeples, and the belfry survived both of the previous steeples' collapses.

=== Interior ===
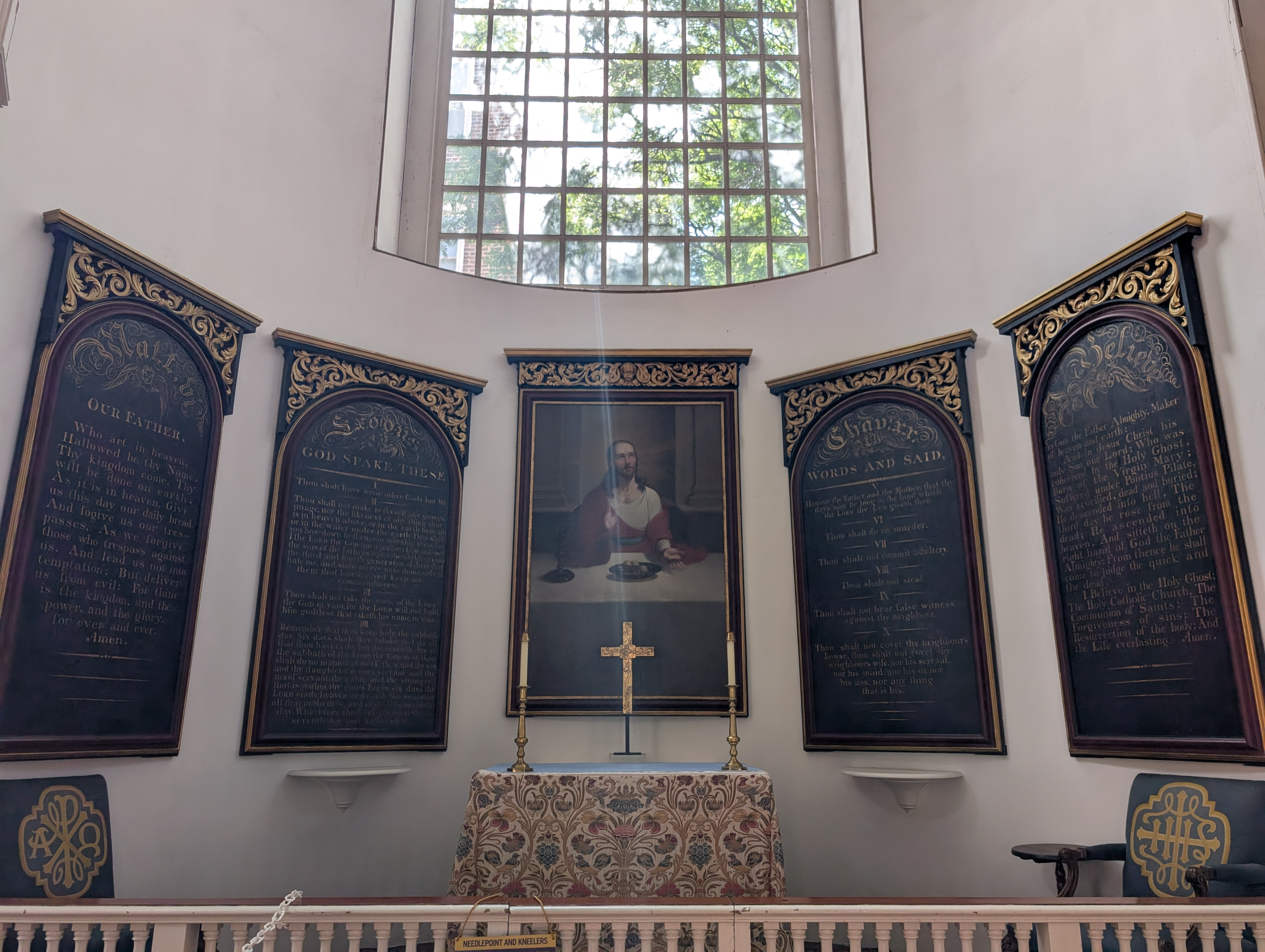
The altar

In contrast to the simple designs of Congregationalist and Puritan meetinghouses in Boston, Old North had a more elaborate interior design, typical of ornately decorated Church of England sanctuaries for the time. A vestibule at the tower's ground level leads into the nave. The foundation walls, along with a brick wall in the cellar measuring 1 5/6 feet (0.56 m) thick, support the first floor. The brick exterior walls hold up only the outer edges of the roof; a system of transverse trusses and longitudinal purlins supports the rest of the roof.

==== Nave ====
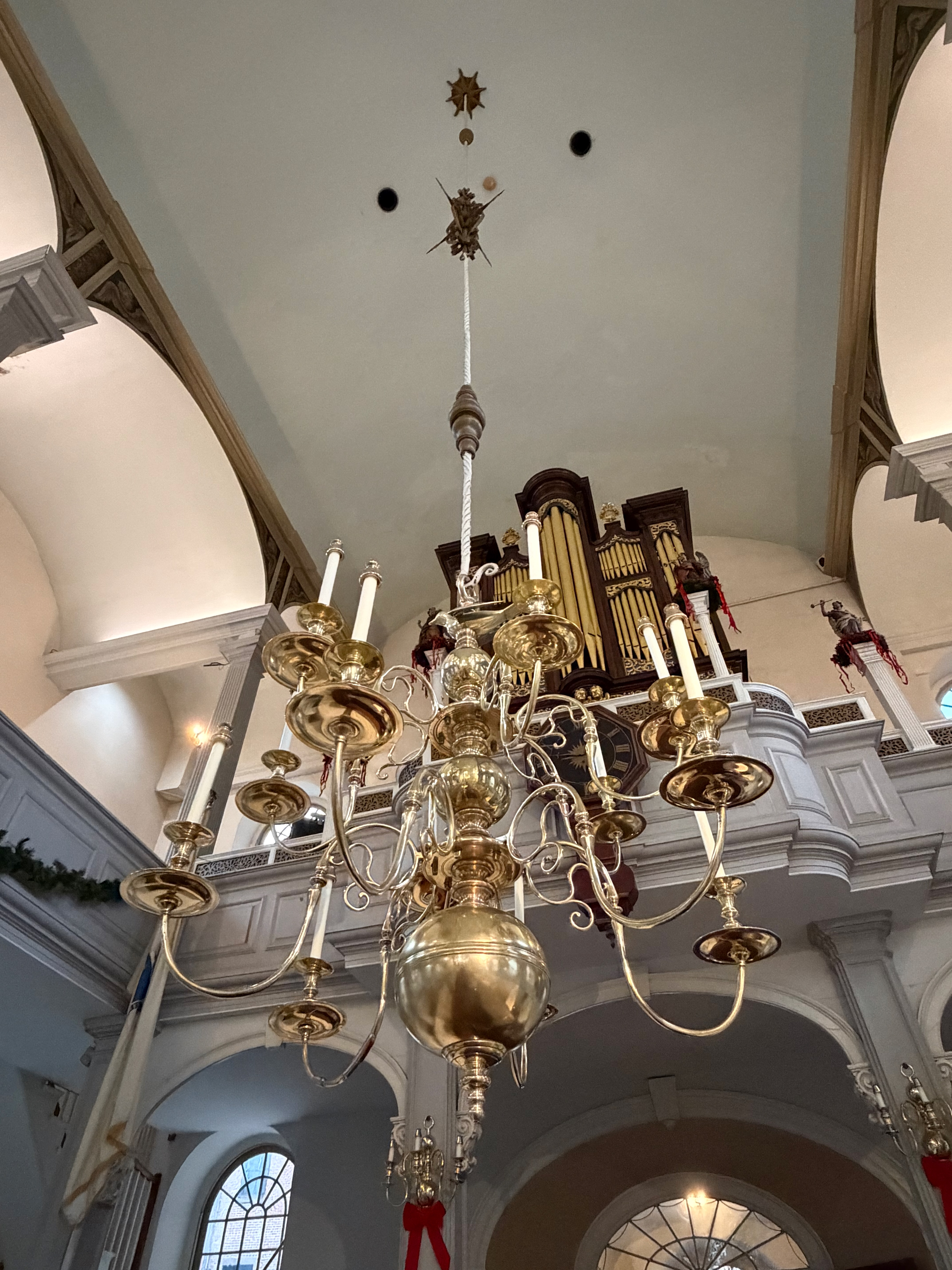
One of the two chandeliers in the church

As built, the nave has a rectangular plan, measuring five by three bays across. The original layout was similar to that of Trinity Church in Newport, Rhode Island, with columns separating two outer aisles from the pews. The main level has box pews; the current pews date from 1912 and are replicas of the original box pews. The main level pews have elaborate moldings and are arranged around three aisles: two at the outer edges and one at the center. The pews were owned by congregants until 1912. The church also had two "Wardens and Strangers" pews for guests, a "Governors' Pew" for visiting politicians, and one pew for the exclusive use of logwood merchants who donated material for the building's construction. Square posts, arranged along the north and south sides of the nave, support a balcony-level gallery on all walls except the western.

The galleries are accessed by staircases at the nave's northwestern and southwestern corners. The staircases date from about 1912 and incorporate elements of two earlier sets of staircases: The orientation is based on the original stairs from 1723, while the balusters and rails are from an 1806 redesign. The gallery-level pews were reserved for slaves, racial minorities, the poor, and the young. The pews on the gallery level have simple moldings. The gallery level has a clock, which was made by Richard Avery. The gallery, which was originally continuous, was divided into two sections when the church's organ was installed.

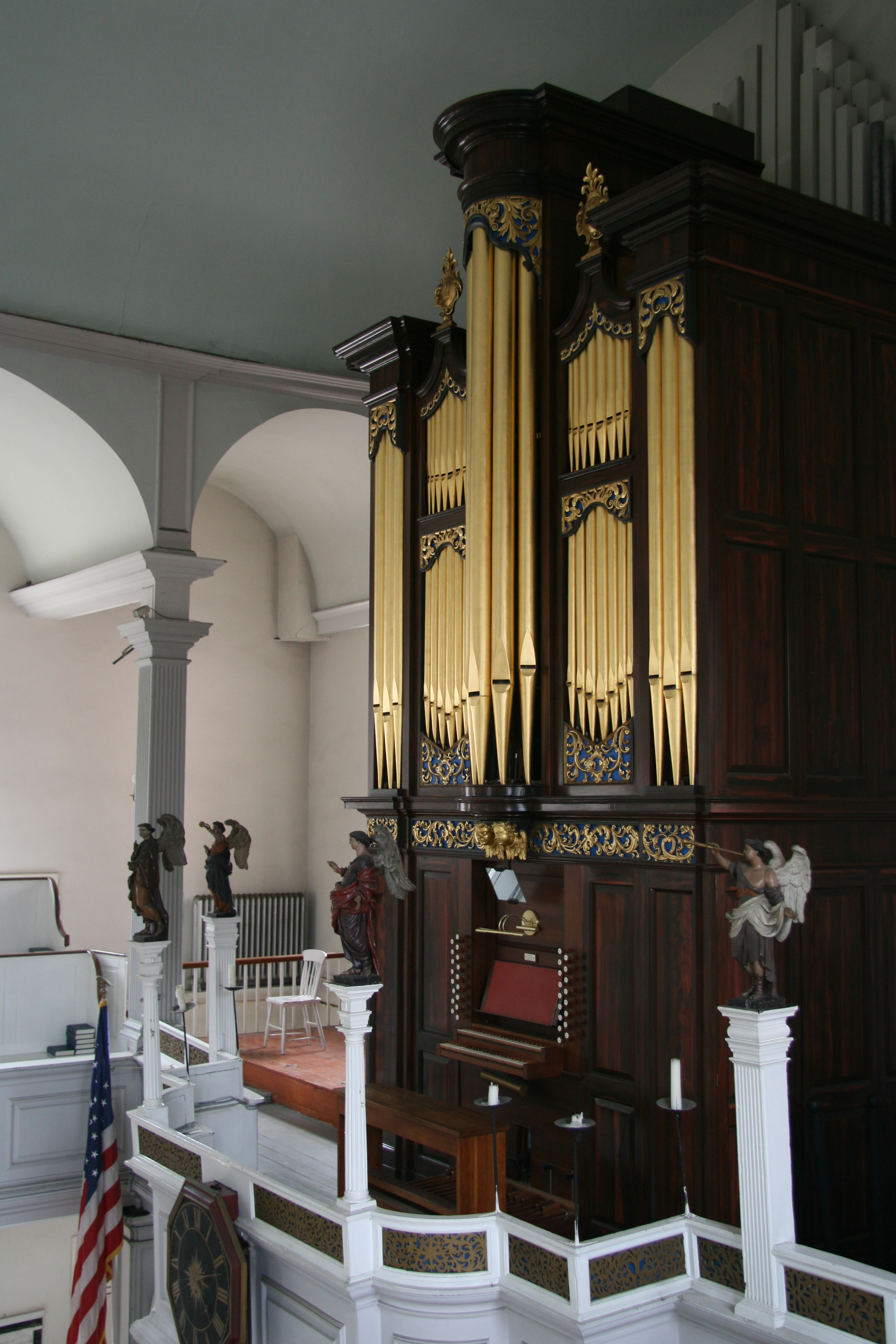
Johnston's organ

The Johnston organ, dating from 1759, is in the nave's eastern gallery. Four wooden angels (sometimes described as cherubs) surround the organ and were donated by Thomas Gruchy in 1746. The angels each measure 2 feet (0.61 m) high and are depicted holding trumpets. The organ loft's woodwork includes a pair of round fluted columns and gilded panels, both designed by William Price. The organ case, originally a bright red, (Note: Suzanne Foley describes the case as being originally "black with touches of blue, vermillion and gold".) has been repainted multiple times throughout the years. There are some pipes outside the organ case, while the remaining pipes are inside it.

The apse was originally fitted with a "Communion table" that functioned as an altar. The modern apse has a pulpit. To the north, the eastern wall has a bust of George Washington, sitting atop a cube. The bust dates from 1815 and was reportedly described by Marquis de Lafayette as looking "more like [Washington] than any other portrait". The nave's ceiling has an elliptical vault, which rises from barrel vaults at either end. Hanging from it are a pair of brass chandeliers, which date from shortly after the church's opening. Each chandelier consists of six globes, each flanked by two candlesticks, and are suspended from twisted irons. LED lamps are placed along the nave's cornices. Originally, the ceiling was decorated by John Gibbs, with winged cherubs and festoons. The cherubs were painted over in the 1912 renovation before being restored in 2025.

==== Crypt ====
The cellar, originally used as storage space, was converted into a crypt in 1732, as the congregation lacked space for a graveyard. The crypt was long believed to have been used until 1860, but a coffin from 1877 was discovered in the 21st century. Some of the burials postdate a city ordinance in 1850, which banned indoor interments. There are 37 tombs in the crypt, where an estimated 1,100 people were buried. The tombs originally had wooden doors, which have been replaced due to deterioration over the years; by the 1980s, they had arched slate doors. Each tomb could fit at least 20–25 coffins, which were placed above each other. The crypt also has an open tomb, which is smaller than the other tombs. Although the wood in the coffins has remained in good shape, the steelwork has deteriorated due to saltwater exposure caused by the relative proximity of the sea.

The congregation sold space in the tombs to members, and benefactors could pay for non-members to be entombed there. Many of the church's donors are interred in the crypt. Notable burials include Old North's founding rector, the Rev. Timothy Cutler. British Marine Major John Pitcairn, who died during the Battle of Bunker Hill, is entombed at Old North, as are other soldiers killed in the battle. Captain Samuel Nicholson of the USS Constitution is also buried in the crypt.

== Related buildings ==
=== Salem Street houses ===
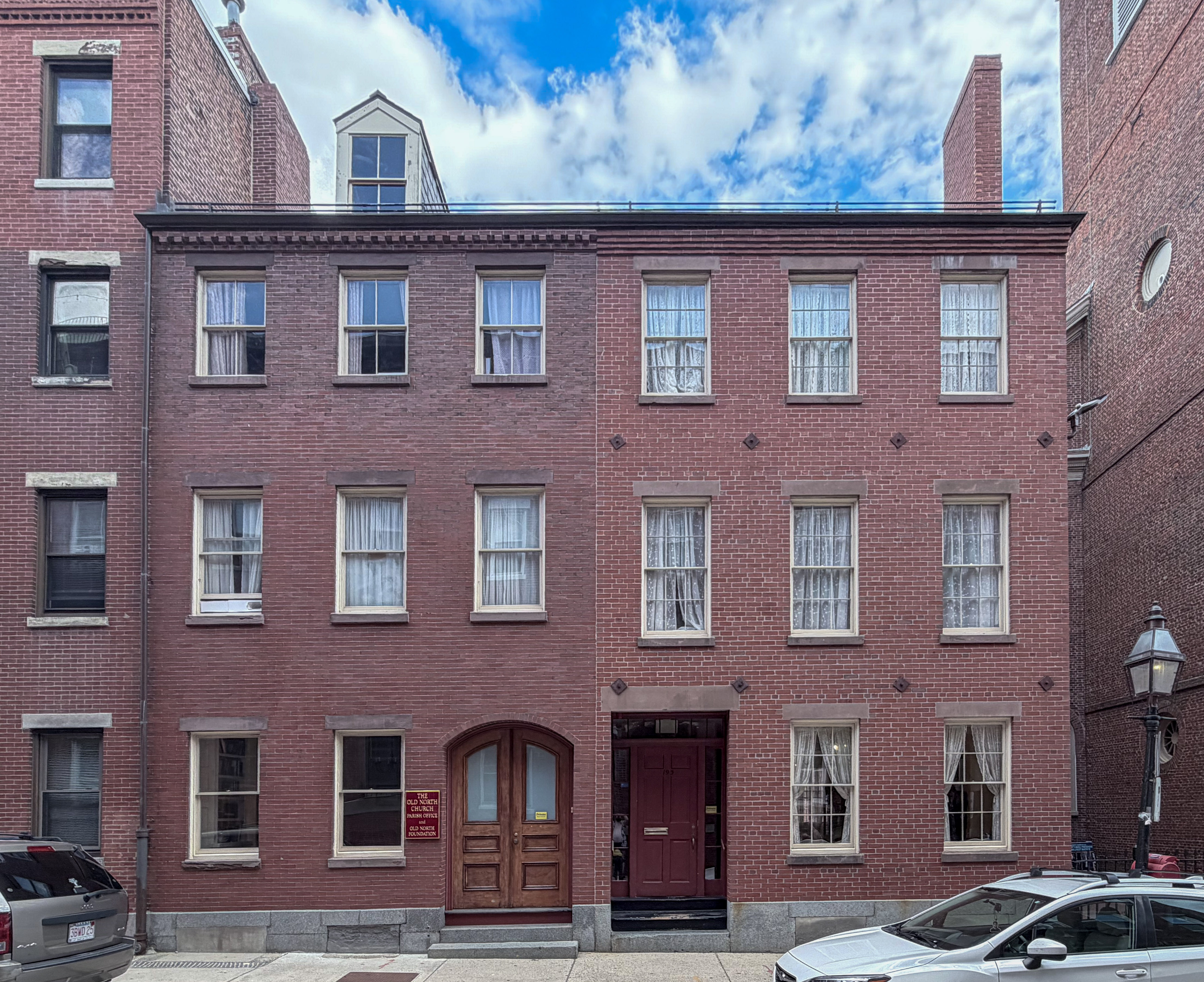
193 and 195 Salem Street

Immediately north of the church, at 193 Salem Street, is the church house (rectory), which has an L-shaped plan. The church house's main section, measuring 3 1/2 stories tall, is a rectangular Greek Revival structure with a slate-covered gable roof, dating from 1850. The primary facade to the west is divided into three bays, each with sash windows except for a ground-level doorway; the side elevation is two bays wide and has two chimneys to the south. There is also a gable-roofed rear section measuring two stories high.

The church house abuts another rowhouse, the parish house at 195 Salem Street. It measures 3 1/2 stories high and dating from either 1840–1850 or 1867. 195 Salem Street has a brick facade divided into three bays, along with an off-center ground-story doorway and protruding dormer windows. It has a slightly more elaborate cornice than the church house.

=== Gift shop (former chapel) ===
The former St. Francis of Assisi Chapel, a brick building dating from 1918, is at 183 Salem Street immediately south of the main church. The building has been owned by the church since 1959 and functions as a gift shop. The chapel is one story high and is variously described as being in the Georgian and North Italian, Romanesque, or Colonial Revival style. The entrance protrudes from the western elevation and contains a paneled door, flanked by columns with carved stone lions at their pedestals and Corinthian-style or acanthus-leaf capitals. Niches with carved religious figures are placed above the capitals, and there is an oxeye window above the entrance. The windows flanking the entrance are asymmetrically arranged. The northern and southern elevations have additional arched windows and fanlights, and there is another entrance on the northern elevation. When used as a chapel, the interior could fit 175 worshippers. Some of the original interior design details remain intact.

=== Clough House ===
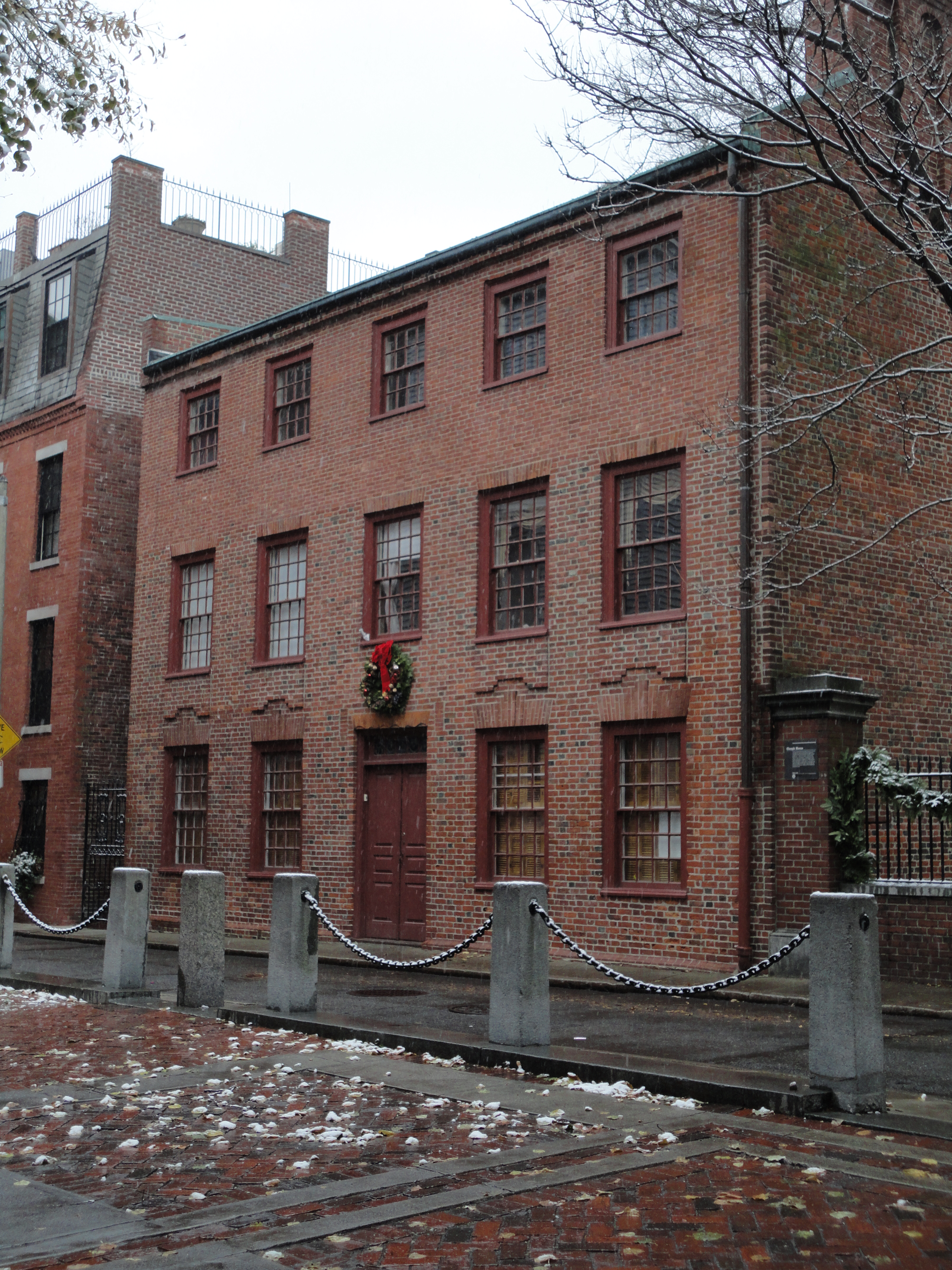
Clough House at 21 Unity Street

At 21 Unity Street is Clough House, built by Ebenezer Clough between 1711 and 1715. It has been part of the church complex since 1959. The building has three stories; the lower two stories date from the original construction, while the third story was built in the 19th century. It has a rectangular plan measuring one by five bays wide, with a gable roof and two chimneys. The first story has a central double-leaf front door with paneling. All three stories have sash windows, though the windows on the third story are shorter than those on the floors below. The western elevation has windows of varying sizes, and a two-story rear shed extends from the building's western section. The roof is made of slate.

== Operations ==
Two organizations jointly operate Old North Church. The congregation, known as Christ Church in the City of Boston, hosts services there. Old North Illuminated, a nonprofit organization, oversees tourism and preservation efforts.

=== Congregation ===
The congregation is an active congregation of the Episcopal Diocese of Massachusetts with a Sunday morning service. It is formally named Christ Church in the City of Boston but is commonly known as the Old North Church. The vicar is the Rev. Dr. Matthew Cadwell, who has served since November 2020.

The congregation once owned communion silver, consisting of 13 pieces. It also owned 14 prayer books and a Vinegar bible given by George II of Great Britain in 1733. The communion silver, later donated to the Museum of Fine Arts, is still used for special occasions. There was also a tankard made of melted-down silver currency, donated in 1729, and a chalice, donated in 1724. The congregational library, dating from 1724, was donated by the SPG. Some of the original furnishings survive at St. Paul's Church in Otis, Massachusetts, a former parish church of Old North. The original furnishings at St. Paul's include a chandelier, along with a two-tiered pulpit and a paneled reading desk. One of the church's original bells is located at the District No. 2 Schoolhouse in Charlton, Massachusetts. The congregation's holdings also formerly included a sword owned by American Civil War officer Robert Gould Shaw. Since 2004, the congregational records have been held by the Massachusetts Historical Society. (Note: For the records, see: The Church Treasurer. (April 18, 1975). "Old North Church (Christ Church in the City of Boston) Records, 1569–1997". Massachusetts Historical Society.)

==== Rectors and vicars ====
The church's minister was originally known as the rector. In 1939, the minister became known as the vicar, while the title of rector was given to the Bishop of the Diocese of Massachusetts. Because of the church's historical prominence, one priest called the position "minister to a community, custodian of a national shrine, and curator of a national museum". For periods where there was no official rector or vicar, a lay minister led services.

Rector/vicar	Start date	End date	Notes
Timothy Cutler	1723	1765	
James Greaton	1765	1767	
Mather Byles Jr.	1768	1775	
Stephen Lewis	1778	1784	
William Montague	1786	1792	
William Walter	1792	1800	
Samuel Haskell	1801	1803	
Asa Eaton	1803	1829	
William Croswell	1829	1839–1940	
John Woart	1840	1852	
William T. Smithett	1852–53	1860	
John T. Burrell	1861	1868	
Henry Burroughs	1868	1882	
William H. Munroe	1882	1892	
Charles W. Duane	1893	1907	
William Lawrence	1908	1913	
William H. DeWart	1914	1926	
Ernest J. Dennen	1927	1929	
Francis E. Webster	1930	1941	
William H. P. Hatch	1941	1946	
Charles R. Peck	1946	1955	
Howard P. Kellett	1956	1971	
Robert W. Golledge	1971	1996	
Stephen T. Ayres	1997	2019	
Matthew Cadwell	2020	present	

==== Worshippers and speakers ====
Notable congregants over the years have included:

- Thomas Gage, British Army general
- Daniel Malcolm, smuggler
- Robert Newman, sexton
- John Pulling, captain
- Joseph Warren Revere, businessman; owned a pew

Harvard College also owned one of the pews. In addition, numerous figures have worshipped at the church for special occasions. U.S. President James Monroe received Holy Communion at Old North Church in 1817, and the British Army's Grenadier Guards band visited the church in 1872. Former president Theodore Roosevelt attended the church's 1912 reopening. President Gerald Ford spoke at the church for the 200th anniversary of Revere's ride in 1975, and Queen Elizabeth II and Prince Philip visited for the U.S. Bicentennial in 1976.

Notable speakers over the years have included early Methodist minister Charles Wesley, who spoke there in 1736. Black Episcopal priest William Levington also spoke at Old North in 1833. Speakers in the 20th century have included politician Edward Lawrence Logan, Army Chief of Staff Leonard Wood, U.S. presidents Calvin Coolidge and Franklin D. Roosevelt (albeit both before their respective presidencies); and diplomat Bruce Laingen. The first woman to give a guest speech at Old North was poet Corinne Roosevelt Robinson, Theodore Roosevelt's younger sister, in 1921.

==== Ties to slavery ====
Several of Old North's earliest members and donors were involved in the Atlantic slave trade or owned slaves directly. Its founding rector Timothy Cutler enslaved a woman, and the SPG owned the Codrington Plantation in Barbados. Congregants were also affiliated with the Rising Sun, a merchant ship, where slaves were held in captivity. Two Old North members, Captain Newark Jackson and merchant George Ledain, were aboard Rising Sun when a mutiny occurred there in 1743. Another pew owner, Leonard Vassall, had a plantation with over 100 slaves.

Slaveowners also donated for the church's construction. Gedway Clarke, a plantation owner in the West Indies, alongside Peter Faneuil each donated 100 pounds for the purchase of the church's bells. Several congregants were also merchants of logwood, an industry that relied on slavery. A group of traders called the "Gentlemen of the Bay of Honduras" donated logwood in 1727 and 1736, which was used to expand the church building. Even after slavery in Massachusetts was banned in 1783, Old North's nonwhite members continued to experience discrimination. In the 2010s, the congregation and foundation asked historian Jared Ross Hardesty to research Old North's historical ties to slavery, following which research fellow Jaimie Crumley conducted further studies into slave-owning congregnats.

=== Old North Illuminated ===
Old North Foundation of Boston Inc., established as a 501(c)(3) organization in 1991, is a secular non-profit organization. Later renamed Old North Illuminated, it is responsible for operating educational programs and preserving the site. As of 2025, Angela Johnson is the chairman of the board and Nikki Stewart is the executive director. Old North Illuminated hosts regular tours of Old North for a fee, and it also gives tours of portions of the church, such as the galleries, bell tower, and crypt. The church is open to secular visitors except on Mondays. Programs include an exhibit on the church's links to slavery and demonstrations of printing presses, along with "Sparking Revolutions", an exhibit on the church's history. Other events are hosted through the year, and the church has also hosted plays and naturalization ceremonies.

The Old North Foundation hosts the annual Lanterns and Luminaries fundraiser near the anniversary of Revere's ride. During the fundraiser, the Lantern Award is distributed to someone who participates in "active citizenship" and exhibits values such as "leadership, courage, hope, [and] tenacity". Every April 18, to celebrate the anniversary of Revere's ride, the church has also hosted a ceremony to light the lanterns in the belfry. The lantern ceremony is usually performed by a sexton or one of Revere's descendants. The church also hosts an annual brass polishing party in November to clean the light fixtures.

== Impact and legacy ==
=== Reception ===
The Springfield Daily Republican wrote in 1913 that Old North was "one of the most historic churches in America, and one of the most beautiful of colonial design". At the church's 200th anniversary, Episcopal Bishop William Lawrence described Old North as having had a greater impact on the United States' creation than any American cathedral had. The Christian Science Monitor said in 1946 that the church's continued presence in the same building was "a symbol of stability in a world of change", and The New York Times wrote in 1960 that Christ Church still commanded "undiminished respect". The Boston Globe characterized the church as a symbol of the United States' creation. Two 20th-century writers also credited the church's mere presence with inspiring patriotism and loyalty in Americans. Boston.com wrote in 2024 that Old North derived much of its fame from Revere's night ride of 1775 and that many guests visited for this reason.

The church also received architectural commentary. The Boston Daily Globe in 1893 called the nave "sombre looking", although it described the structure as "in its day one of the architectural ornaments of the North End". An article in The Arizona Republican said in 1902 that visitors entering the church were "struck by its peculiar architecture as compared with the edifices of today", and the Austin American-Statesman described it as being well-preserved. The Boston Daily Globe called the church "a thing of beauty" in 1910, and The Springfield Union wrote the next year that the building "has the plain monotonous style peculiar to the old houses of worship", enlivened primarily by the steeple. The Daily Republican in 1913 particularly praised the interior design. In the mid-20th century, historian Suzanne Foley described the church building as "an architectural stepping stone for Georgian church building in America", even though a trained architect did not work on the design, and The Boston Globe said its ancient design was "a silent prayer". Because the site was hemmed in by narrow streets and other buildings, The New York Times said in 1988 that "you may be surprised at the size and stateliness of the Old North Church". The Salt Lake Tribune said in 1993 that the church and its tall brick tower appeared "as if built for its grand place in history", while writer Howard S. Andros said in 2001 that the building was "long a welcome beacon" for seafarers.

=== Landmark designations and media ===
The building was designated a National Historic Landmark (NHL) on October 9, 1960. It was added to the National Register of Historic Places on October 15, 1966, the day the National Historic Preservation Act of 1966 went into effect. Old North is one of eight sites in the 43-acre (17 ha) Boston National Historical Park, which was designated in 1974. The Boston Landmarks Commission designated Old North as a Boston Landmark in 2025, including the exteriors of the church and surrounding buildings.

A tablet in Paul Revere Mall commemorates Old North Church. The church was depicted in a cachet issued by the United States Postal Service in 1973, a stamp issued in 1975, and a Forever stamp issued in 2025. A replica was built in the Hollywood Hills neighborhood of Los Angeles, California. Another replica in Beverly Shores, Indiana, housing a Presbyterian congregation, was relocated from the 1933 Century of Progress fair in Chicago.

== See also ==
- List of National Historic Landmarks in Boston
- National Register of Historic Places listings in northern Boston
- List of the oldest churches in the United States

Preceded by Old State House, Boston	Tallest Building in Boston; 1745–1810; 53 m	Succeeded by Park Street Church
Preceded by Paul Revere House	Locations along Boston's Freedom Trail; Old North Church	Succeeded by Copp's Hill
