= Old North Church (Hollywood) =

Church in Hollywood Hills, California

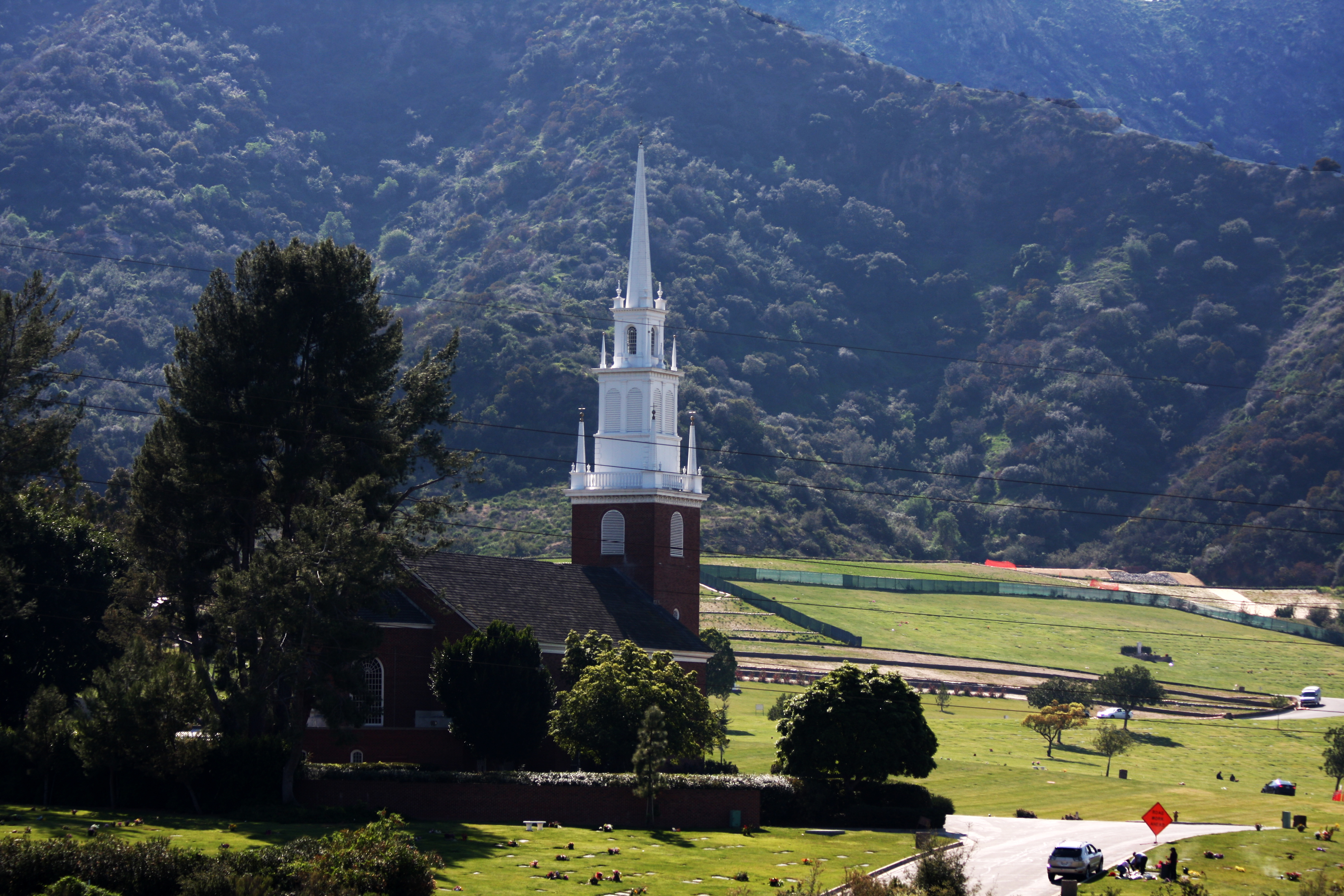
- The church in 2009, looking south
- Old North Church
- 34.1456°N 118.3177°W
- Location: Hollywood Hills, California
- Address: 6300 Forest Lawn Drive, Forest Lawn Memorial Park
- Country: United States
- Website: Old North Church

Architecture
- Architectural type: Georgian

Old North Church is a church located within Forest Lawn Memorial Park in Hollywood Hills, California. It is a precise replica of Boston's historic church, from Henry Wadsworth Longfellow's poem "Paul Revere's Ride". The historical rooms have documents and mementos of the colonial period.

As part of a plan to reproduce the setting of the Boston church, a marble bust of George Washington was commissioned. It was sculpted by Enzo Pasquini. The re-creation led to a lawsuit in 1970 (H. H. Elder & Co. and Forest Lawn Co. v. United States), which was dismissed.
