= Old North Memorial Garden =

Memorial garden in Boston, Massachusetts, U.S.

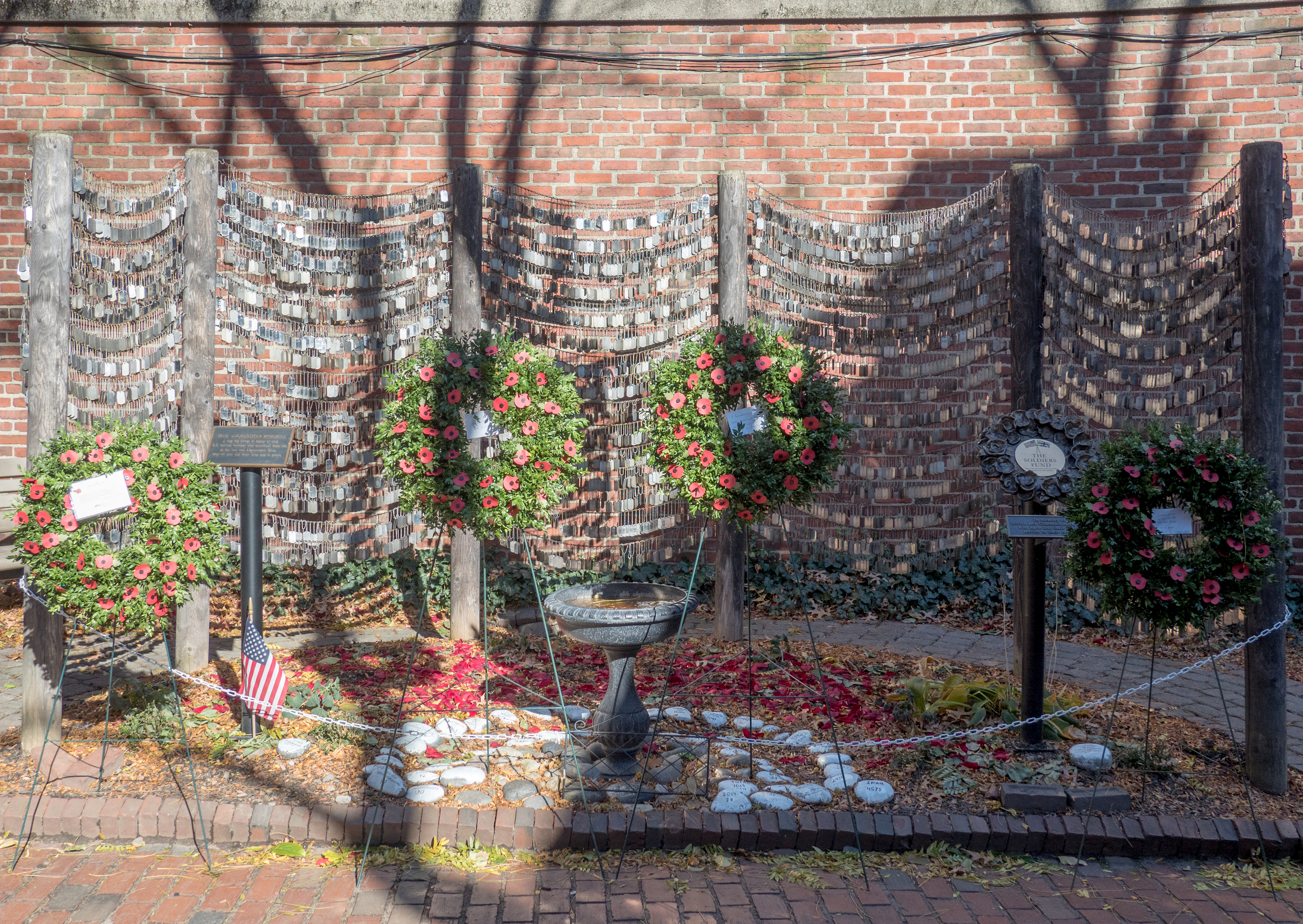
- The memorial in 2019

- Location within Boston
- Type: Garden
- Nearest city: Boston, Massachusetts
- Coordinates: 42.36619°N 71.05424°W
- Created: 2005

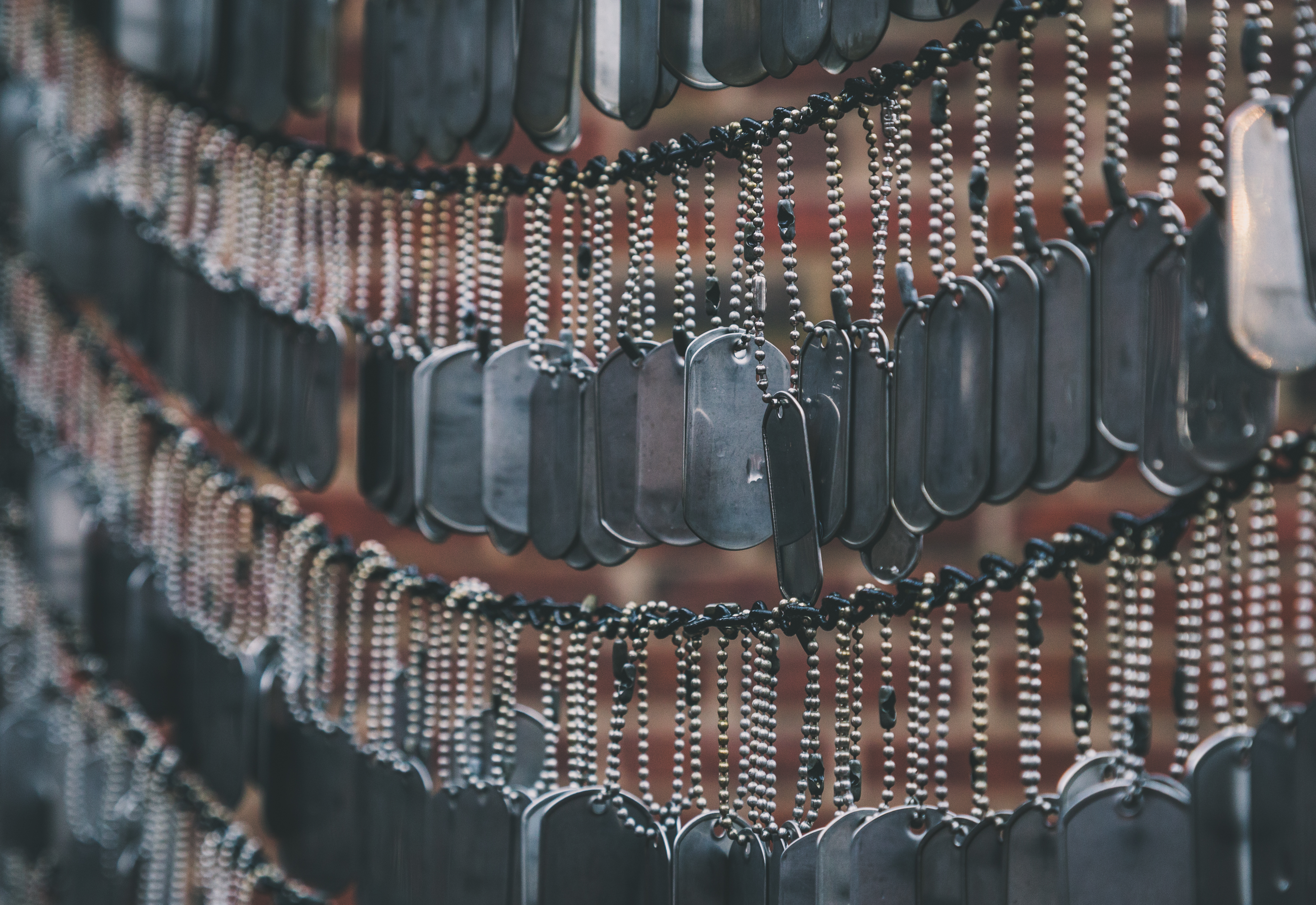
Dog tags hanging in the garden

The Old North Memorial Garden is a garden outside the Old North Church in Boston's North End neighborhood, in the U.S. state of Massachusetts.

== Description and history ==
The garden was designed and built by a group of volunteers in 2005 to commemorate those killed in the Iraq and Afghanistan wars.

Two plaques for the garden's Iraq–Afghanistan Memorial were unveiled in 2018; one describes the dog tags representing American service members killed during the wars, and the other is a bronze poppy wreath commemorating British and Commonwealth service members who died.

== Reception ==
The Los Angeles Times called the memorial "a good place to reflect on war — from America’s birth (the city's famed Paul Revere statue is nearby too) to its ongoing conflicts".
