= Robert Newman (sexton) =

American Revolutionary War figure

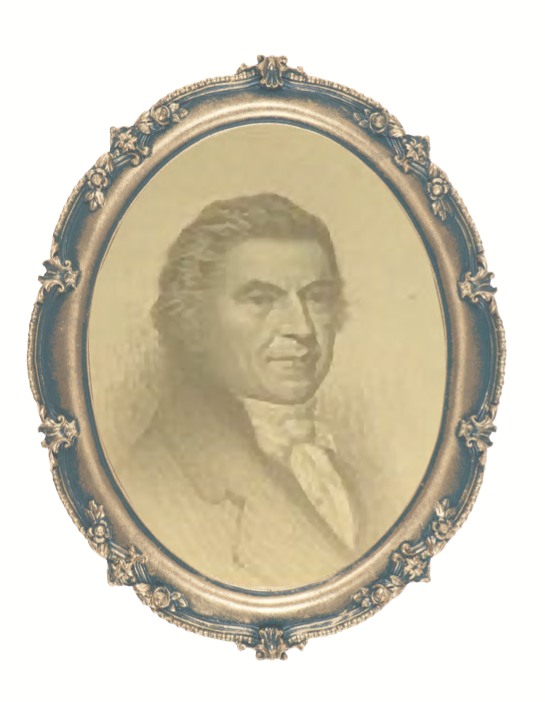
- Robert Newman portrait, sometime after the Revolutionary War
- Born: March 20, 1752; Boston
- Died: May 26, 1804 (aged 52); Boston
- Resting place: Copp's Hill Burying Ground
- Occupation: Sexton
- Employer: Old North Church

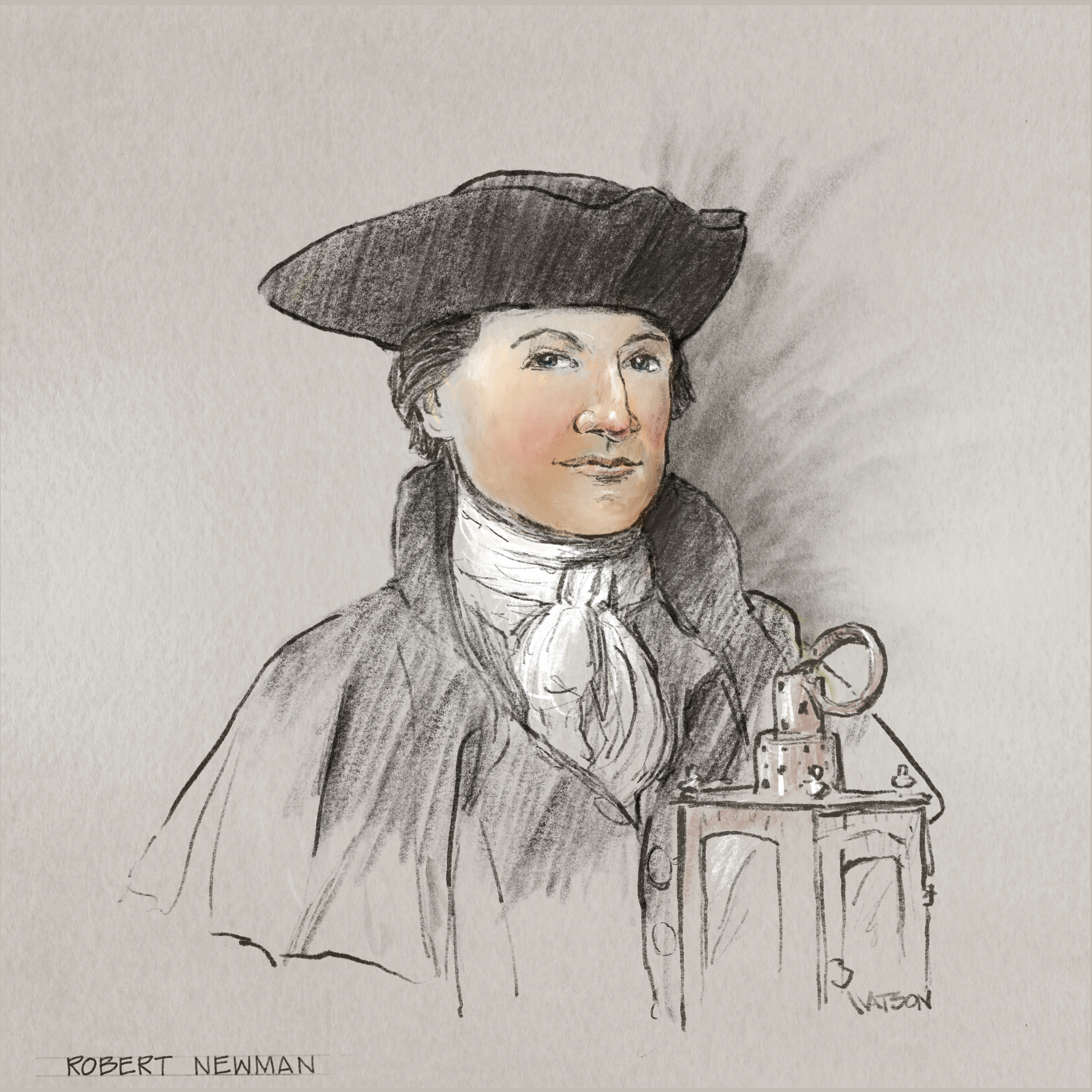
Artist Rendering of Robert Newman at 23 years of age, by Dale Watson, Courtesy of the American Battlefield Trust

Robert Newman (March 20, 1752 – May 26, 1804) was an American sexton at Old North Church in Boston, Massachusetts. He is considered a patriot in the American Revolution for hanging two lanterns in his church's steeple on April 18, 1775, part of a warning signal leading up to Paul Revere's and William Dawes' midnight rides, on the eve of the Battles of Lexington and Concord.

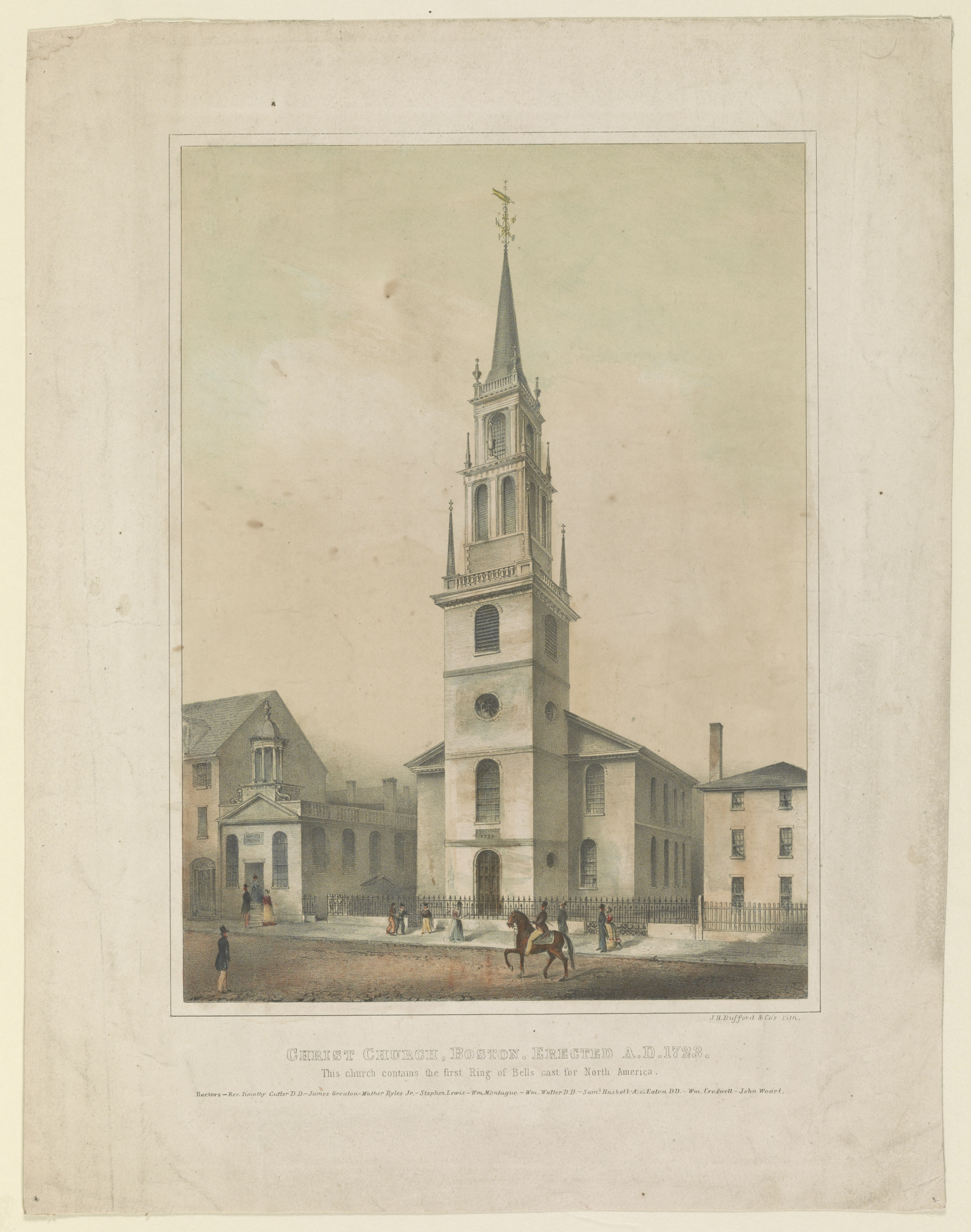
Painting of Christ Church, later renamed Old North Church, in North End, Boston. Exact date unknown.

== Early life ==
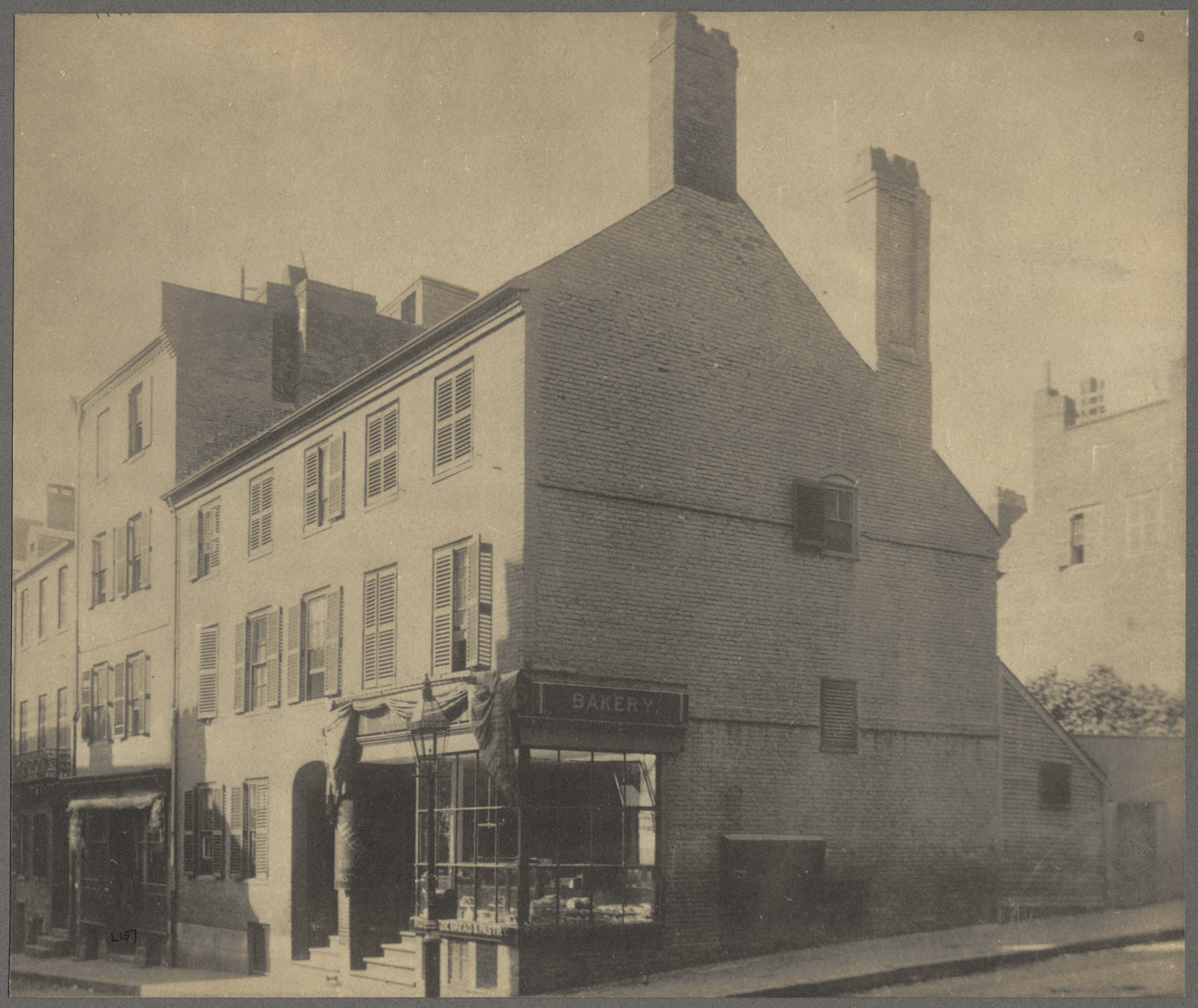
Robert Newman House (c. 1898), corner of Salem and Sheaffe Streets, with the later added storefront

In 1741, Newman's parents purchased a three-storied, prominent house in Boston's North End and moved with their young children. Newman was born eleven years later, in 1751, the last of five children. His father, Thomas Newman, had been a successful merchant until his sudden disappearance in 1754, when he was lost at sea, leaving his mother, Mary Thomas, in a financial lurch. Newman's older brothers were educated alongside John Hancock, Sam Adams and Paul Revere at the North Writing School and went on to have careers as a watchmaker, teacher and organist. Yet, with the dramatic change in family fortune, Newman was unable to attain the same quality of educated and instead apprenticed as a leather britches maker and later served as sexton to Christ Church.

== Career ==
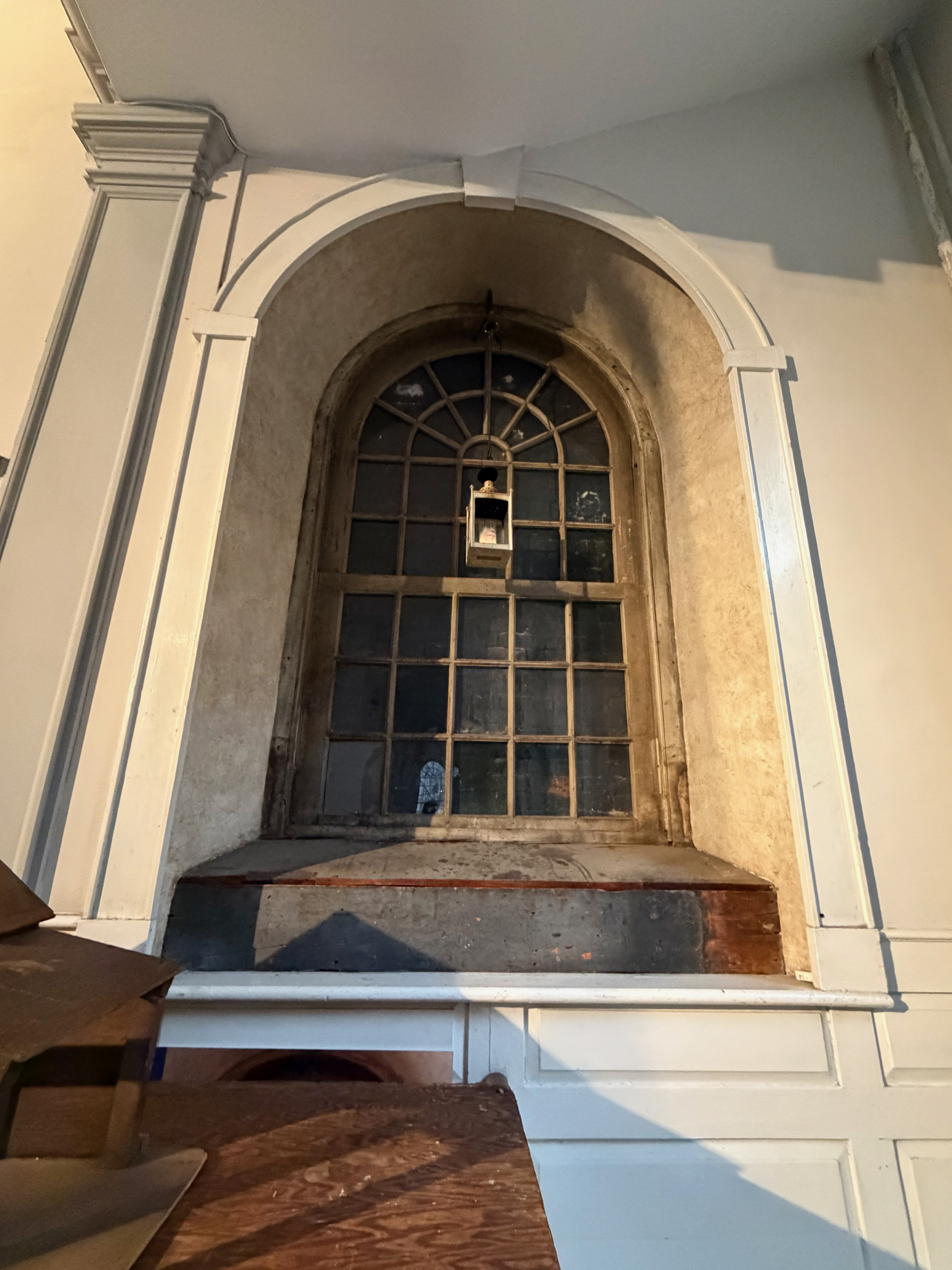
The "Newman window", Old North Church, Boston

Robert Newman become the sexton of Christ Church (now named Old North Church) in 1772. He was a member of the Sons of Liberty and resided by the church, in Boston's North End. The Newman family was quartering British Regulars in their home, a common practice in 1775 while the city was under siege.

After pretending to go to bed on the night of April 18, then twenty three year-old, Newman snuck out of his house undetected by the Regulars and joined vestryman John Pulling and Pastor Thomas Bernard, who assisted him with the signal. Bernard served as a lookout while Pulling and Newman went to the belfry, the tallest structure in the area. Using a code devised by Revere, Newman climbed the church's 3 part, 8-story tall steeple and hung two lanterns in the belfry to warn Patriots that the British Regulars were about to descend upon Lexington via the Charles River. As depicted by Longfellow's poem, Paul Revere's Ride, "One [lantern] if by land, and two [lanterns] if by sea..."

The signal was spotted across the river and allies began spreading the word. British Regulars also witnessed the display and encircled the church. According to local legend, Newman escaped out a back window of the church and fled for home. General Thomas Gage arrested him the following day, April 19, yet nothing could be proven against Newman, and he was released three days later. He reported passing the keys of the church to Pulling, and when British authorities went to question Pulling, he had already escaped to Nantucket, where he remained until it was safe to return.

Newman later joined the Society of Free Masons, in 1783, and continued as sexton of the Old North Church until his death by suicide on May 26, 1804. The famous steeple was toppled by the Snow Hurricane of 1804, the autumn after Newman's passing. He was survived by his second wife, Mary Hammon, whom he married in 1790, and their five children. He is buried at Copp's Hill Burying Ground in Boston. His collected letters were published on the bicentennial of his signal, in 1975. One of the two original lanterns remains and is on display at the Concord Museum.

== Notable family members ==
Newman's maternal great-grandfather was Reverend George Burroughs, the Harvard educated, non-ordained minister who was sentenced for witchcraft and hanged in Salem in 1692.

Isaiah Thomas, first cousin to Newman, was the editor of the Massachusetts Spy and founder of the American Antiquarian Society.

== Historic Marker Sites ==
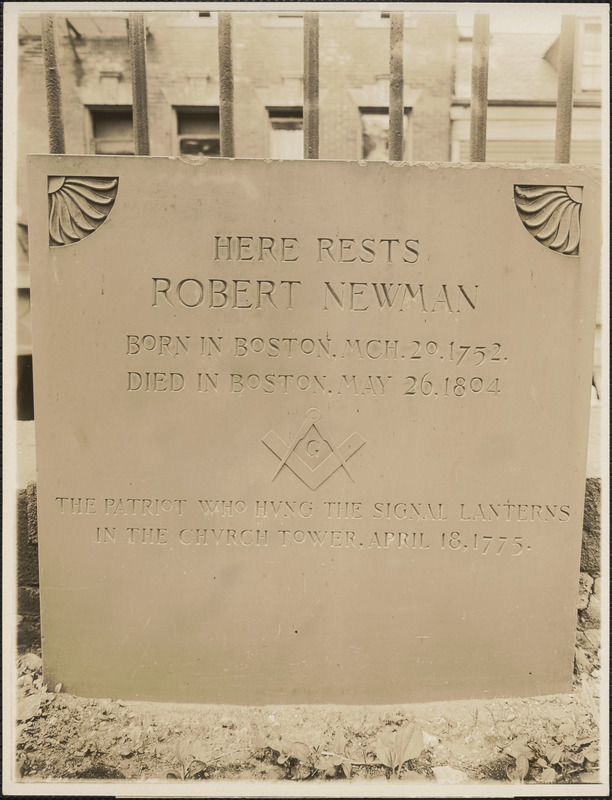
Newman's grave at Copp's Hill Burying Ground

- Metal plaque: Charlestown, MA
- Stone tablet: Old North Church Courtyard, Boston, MA
- Stone tablet: North End, Boston, MA
- Timeline: Boston, MA
- Pews #50 and #78: Old North Church, Boston, MA
