= John Pulling =

American captain, vestryman and Patriot

John Pulling Jr was an American captain, vestryman and Patriot who, along with Robert Newman, signaled Paul Revere from the Old North Church in Boston before Revere's midnight ride.

In the days before April 18, 1775, Revere had enlisted the help of Pulling and Robert Newman, the sexton of Christ Church (later named Old North Church), to send a signal by lantern to alert colonists in Charlestown as to the movements of the British Regulars when the information became known. In what is well known today by the phrase "one if by land, two if by sea", one lantern in the steeple would signal the army's choice of the land route while two lanterns would signal the route "by water" across the Charles River (the movements would ultimately take the water route, and therefore two lanterns were placed in the steeple). Pulling was a logical choice to help signal. He was heavily involved with the church, and was a vestryman. If caught with the lanterns, he could provide a meaningful excuse for being in the church.

On the evening of April 18, Pulling and Newman hung two lanterns from the steeple of the church for just under a minute, just long enough for the militia in Charlestown to receive the signal.
