= John Childs (aviator) =

American aviator

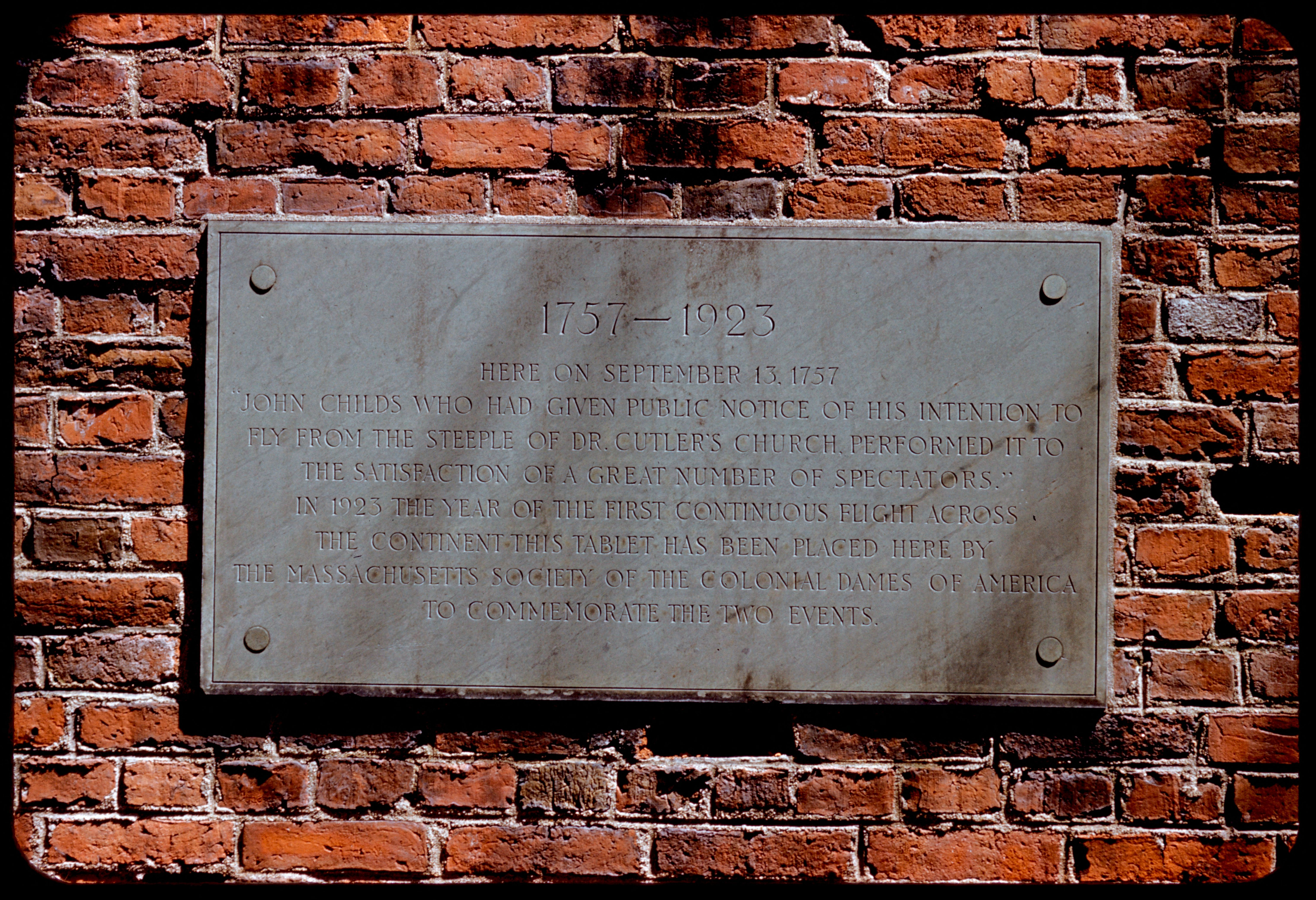
Plaque on Old North Church

John Childs, the "Flying Man" of Boston, Massachusetts made the first known flight in America on September 13, 1757, to a crowd of spectators, suspended by a rope from a feathered glider. The next day, on September 14 Mr. Childs successfully flew two more times.

A plaque on one of the walls of Old North Church in Boston commemorates the event: "Here on September 13, 1757, John Childs-who had given public notice of his intention to fly from the steeple of Dr. Cutler's church-performed it to the satisfaction of a great number of spectators."

The September 1757 issue of The Boston News-Letter, featured an article by a reporter who witnessed the second day's flights:

"[Mr. Childs] set off with two pistols loaded, one of which he discharged in his descent, the other missing fire, he cocked and snapped again before he reached the Place prepared to receive him."

The September 23, 1757 issue of The New Hampshire Gazette reported of the event:

"[Last] Tuesday in the afternoon John Childs, who had given public notice of his intention to fly from the steeple of Dr. Cutler's Church, performed it to the satisfaction of a great number of spectators; and Wednesday in the afternoon he again performed it twice; the last time he set off with two pistols loaded, one of which discharged in his descent, the other missing fire, he cocked and snapped again before he reached the place prepared to receive him. It is supposed from the steeple to the place where the rope was fixed was about 700 feet upon a slope, and that he was about 16 & 18 seconds performing it each time. As these performances led many people from their business, he is forbid flying any more in the town. The said Childs says he has flown from the highest steeples in England, and off the Monument, by the Duke of Cumberland's Desire."
