= Sexton (office) =

Church officer

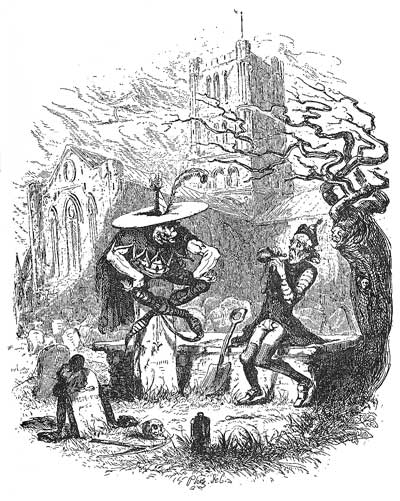
- Hablot Knight Browne illustration: "The Goblin and the sexton" (published in The Pickwick Papers, 1837)

Occupation
- Occupation type: Officer
- Activity sectors: Church, congregation, or synagogue

Description
- Related jobs: Sacristan

A sexton is an officer of a church, congregation, or synagogue charged with the maintenance of its buildings and/or an associated cemetery. In smaller places of worship, this office is often combined with that of verger. Larger establishments, such as cathedrals, may employ a team of sextons.

Historically in North America and the United Kingdom the "sexton" was sometimes a minor municipal official responsible for overseeing the town cemetery. In the United Kingdom the position still exists today, related to management of the community's cemetery, with such sextons usually employed by the town/parish or community council.

== Origin of the name ==
The words "sexton" and "sacristan" both derive from the Medieval Latin word sacristanus meaning "custodian of sacred objects". "Sexton" represents the popular development of the word via the Old French "Segrestein".

== Duties ==
Among the traditional duties of the sexton in small parishes was the digging of graves—the gravedigger in Hamlet refers to himself as sexton, for example. In modern times, grave digging and maintenance of the cemetery is usually done by an outside contractor. The general duties of a modern sexton may include:

- Operation and maintenance of mechanical systems, such as: refrigerators, boilers, HVAC (heating, ventilation, and air conditioning) units, hot water systems, kitchen equipment, electrical system, and piping systems (i.e., gas, water, fire protection, and sewer systems).
- Liaison with any routine contract maintenance and supply companies (regarding: large maintenance projects, fire protection equipment, pest control, kitchen and worship materials, etc.)
- Ordering and receiving supplies and equipment.
- Stocking supplies (paper towels, toilet paper, soap, etc.)
- Tasks involving security (locking doors, operating security system, etc.), and safety (emergency light/exit sign testing, first aid kit maintenance, etc.).
- Logistics for regular services and events on church calendar (chairs and tables, decorating, lighting, acoustics, audio and video, etc.).
- Emergency response during bad weather.
- Small building repairs (painting, drywall/plaster work, replacing ceiling tiles, etc.).
- Maintaining the grounds (grass mowing, hedge/shrub trimming and tree pruning, weed control, watering plants, snow removal, fall clean up, and other landscaping work).
- Regular cleaning (vacuuming, dusting, sweeping, mopping, etc.)
- Other maintenance tasks not handled by a contract service or church volunteers, such as: the replacement of light bulbs, returning premises to a neat and orderly state following services and events, disposal of trash (rubbish), running any local errands or trips that are needed by the church, and other miscellaneous tasks.
- Following building code.
- Report to supervisors (about tasks completion, mishaps, etc.).

In many UK churches nowadays, where neither a sexton nor a verger is employed, these duties are likely to fall to the churchwardens.

== See also ==
- Gabbai
- Robert Newman (sexton)
