= John Tytler =

John Tytler may refer to:

- John Tytler (VC)
- John Tytler (surgeon)

== See also ==
- John Tyler (disambiguation)
