= David Hess (disambiguation) =

David Hess (1936–2011) was an American actor and songwriter.

David Hess may also refer to:

- David Hess (baseball) (born 1993), professional baseball pitcher
- David Hess (painter) (1770–1843), Swiss writer, caricaturist, and politician
- David Hess (politician) (born 1942), Republican member of the New Hampshire House of Representatives
- David M. Hess, a New York City landlord; see Hess triangle
