= John Tayler (disambiguation) =

John Tayler (1742–1829) was an American merchant and politician

John Tayler may also refer to:

- John Frederick Tayler (1802–1889), 19th-century English landscape watercolour painter
- John James Tayler (1797–1869), English Unitarian Minister

== See also ==
- John Tyler, several people
- John Tylor, several people
