= Cleombrotus =

The name Cleombrotus (Greek: Κλεόμβροτος Kleombrotos) may refer to:

- Cleombrotus (regent), uncle and regent of Spartan king Pleistarchus
- Cleombrotus I (d. 371 BC), king of Sparta from 380 to 371 BC
- Cleombrotus II, king of Sparta from 242 to 241 BC
- Cleombrotus of Ambracia, a character in Plato's Phaedo
