= Opposition House =

Historic house in Massachusetts, United States

- U.S. National Register of Historic Places
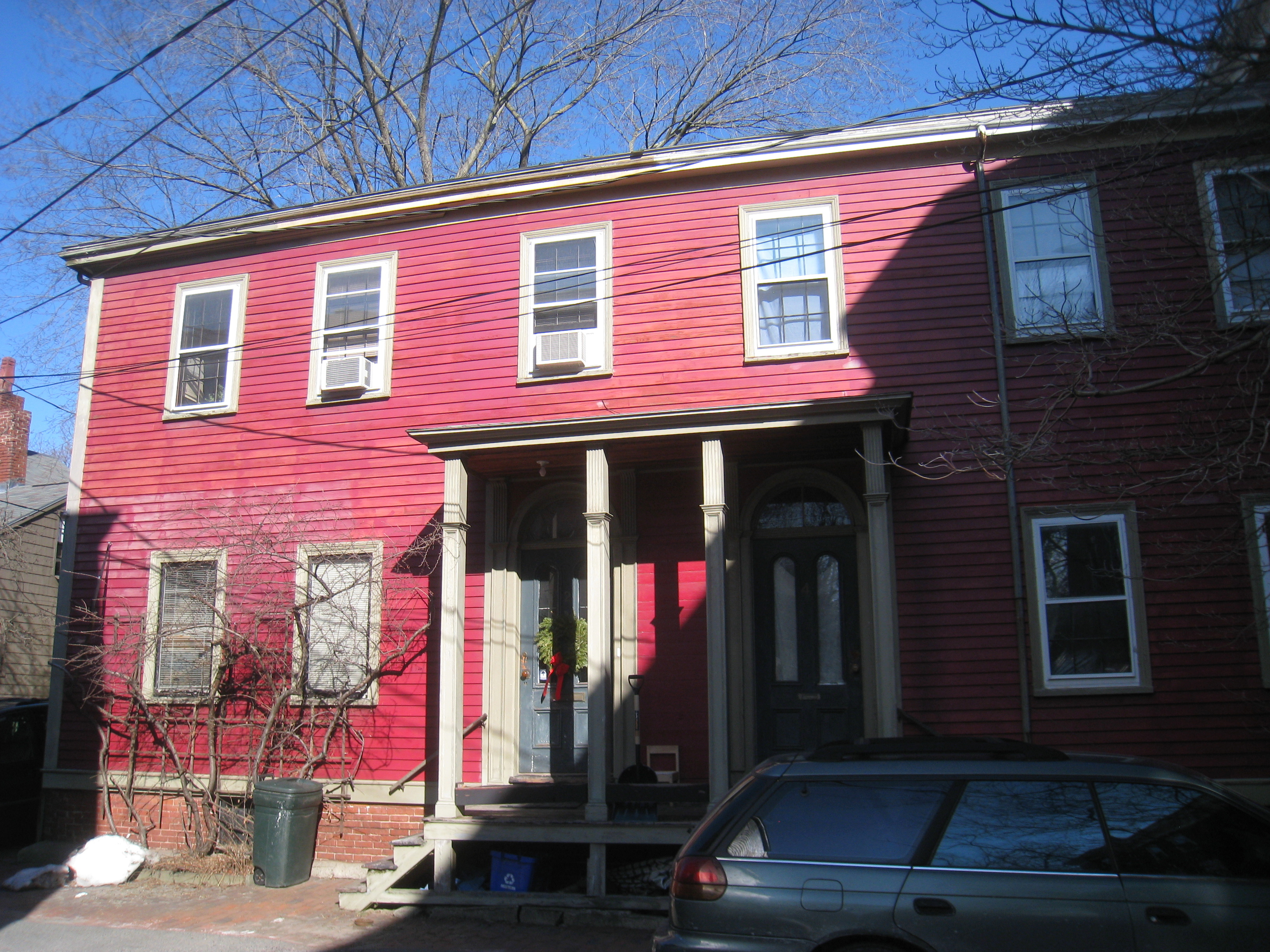

- Location within Massachusetts Location within the United States
- Location: 2–4 Hancock Place, Cambridge, Massachusetts
- Coordinates: 42.369514°N 71.1068103°W
- Built: 1807
- Architectural style: Federal
- MPS: Cambridge MRA
- NRHP reference No.: 82001969
- Added to NRHP: April 13, 1982

Opposition House is a historic double house in Cambridge, Massachusetts. The two story hip-roofed wood-frame house was built in 1807 by Judge Francis Dana, who was seeking to prevent the laying of Harvard Street across his estate, making it a kind of spite house. Dana's efforts were unsuccessful; the road was routed around this house, which he had sited along the intended route. The house was moved to its present location in the 1860s. It is the oldest surviving house on Dana Hill.

The house was listed on the National Register of Historic Places in 1982.

== See also ==
- National Register of Historic Places listings in Cambridge, Massachusetts
