= Pink House (Newbury, Massachusetts) =

Historic house in Massachusetts, US

The Pink House
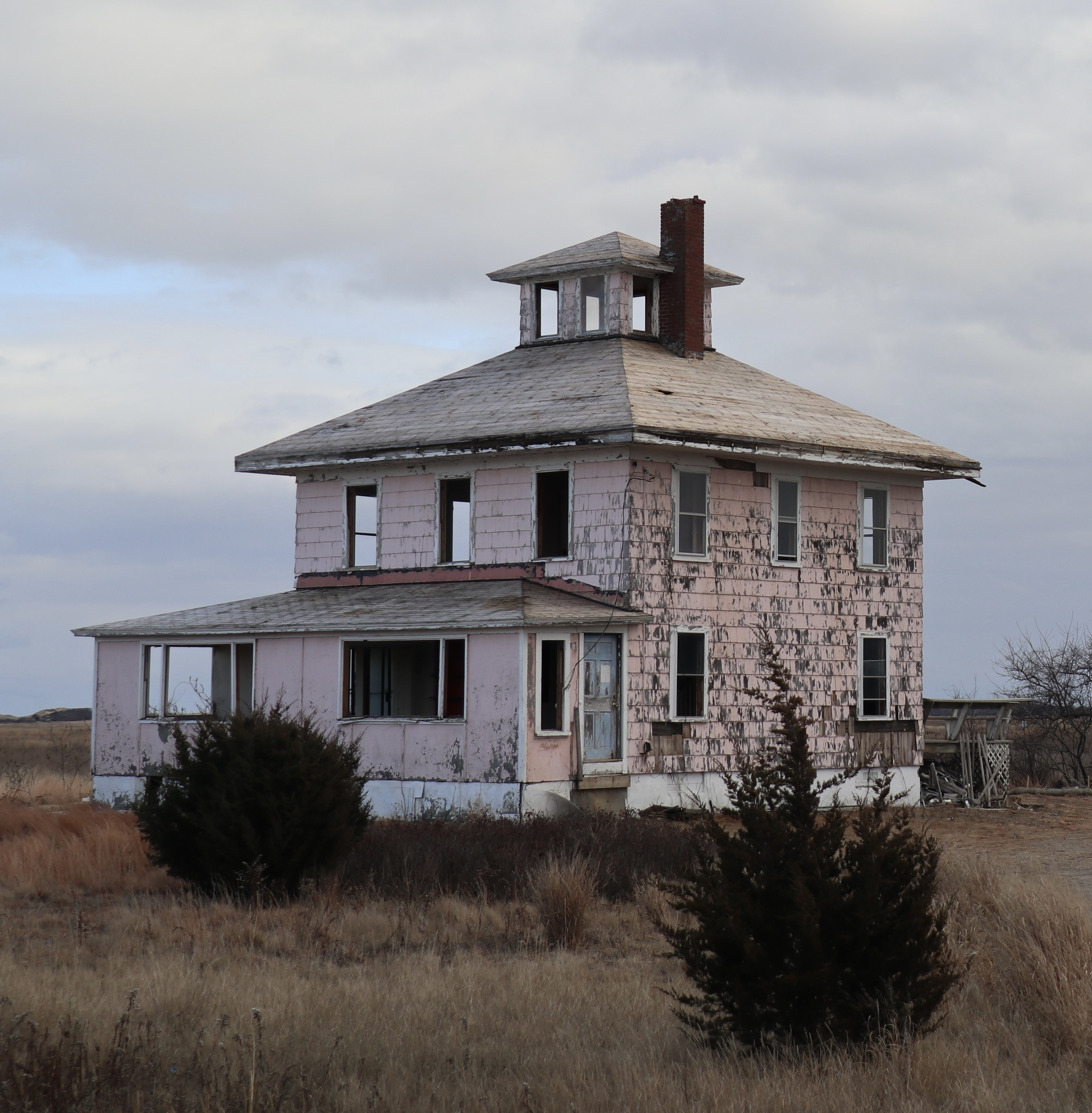
- Pink House in 2025
- Interactive map of the The Pink House area

General information
- Status: Demolished
- Architectural style: American Foursquare
- Location: 60 Plum Island Turnpike; Newbury, Massachusetts
- Coordinates: 42.796300°N 70.830223°W
- Completed: 1922
- Demolished: 11 March 2025

Technical details
- Floor count: 2

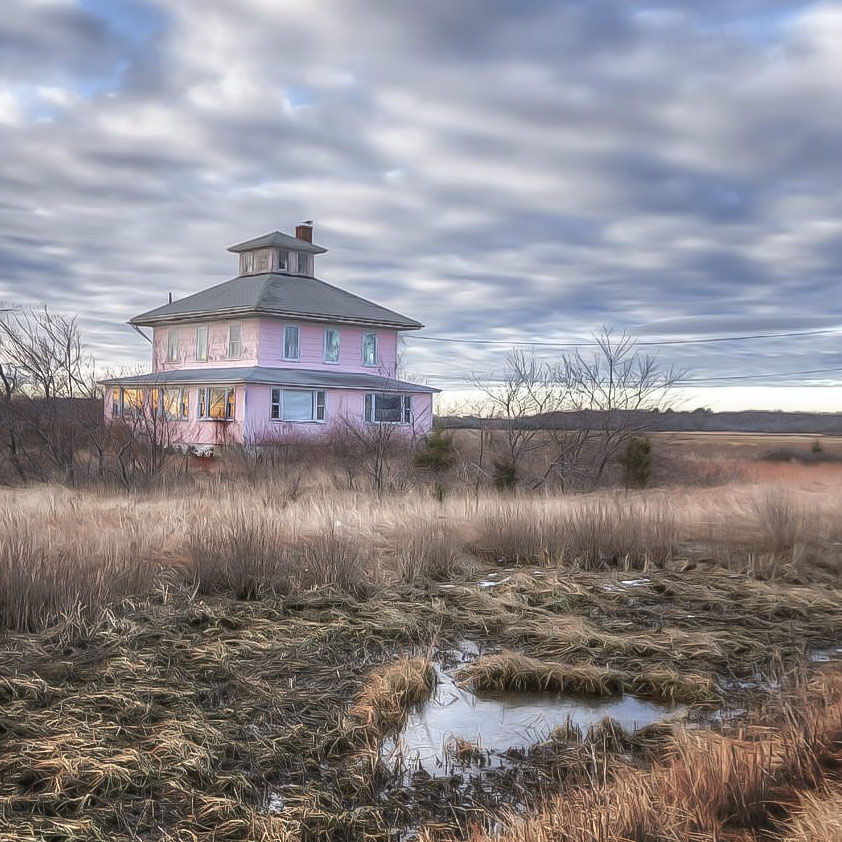
The house on the way to Plum Island

The Pink House was an uninhabited historic house and popular photography and painting subject in Newbury, Massachusetts, United States. The house was built in 1925 and was privately owned until it was sold to Parker River National Wildlife Refuge for $375,000 in 2011. The house was considered by many to be a local icon and was the subject of a grassroots campaign to buy back the property from the refuge to preserve the house. In March 2025, after a decade of debate and legal challenges, the United States Fish and Wildlife Service demolished the house with intentions to restore the property to a wildlife habitat with partial public access.

== Preservation movement ==
The house was built in 1925 and was privately owned until it was sold and became part of the Parker River National Wildlife Refuge in 2011. The refuge, which had originally planned on using the property for seasonal staff housing, completed a preliminary environmental survey of the building in 2014, finding asbestos-containing building materials. In 2015, amid community concerns the Parker River National Wildlife Refuge would demolish the property, a group founded by local residents was formed to advocate for the preservation of the house. After initially proposing demolition in 2016, the refuge agreed to postpone to explore alternatives and give time to find a suitable land transfer. In 2018, refuge staff met with members of Essex County Greenbelt, a conservation organization, to discuss the option of a land transfer.

In November 2023, the Fish and Wildlife Service announced plans to demolish the Pink House in the coming months following a period of public comment, citing nearly eight years of unsuccessful land transfer attempts, rising maintenance costs of the degrading building, and the refuge's duty to preserve wildlife. In the proposal, they announced plans to replace the Pink House with a public observation platform to view the salt marsh.

On October 30, 2024, Massachusetts Governor Maura Healey announced that the Pink House's demolition would be placed on hold. On February 28, 2025, the USFWS announced plans to proceed with demolition, and on March 11, 2025 the building was razed.

== Origin legend ==
The house's notoriety is in part due to a popular local urban legend about its creation. The story suggests the house's location was a result of a divorce in which the wife demanded an exact replica of their Newburyport house, but failed to specify the location, resulting in the spiteful husband building it on the edge of town, in the Great Marsh with saltwater plumbing. For this reason, the building is often listed as an example of a spite house.

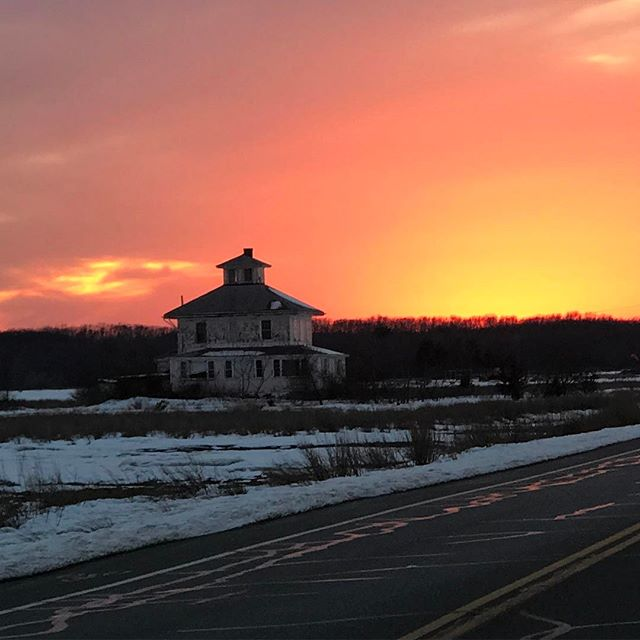
Pink House at sunset
