= Spite House (Rockport, Maine) =

Historic house in Maine, United States

- U.S. National Register of Historic Places
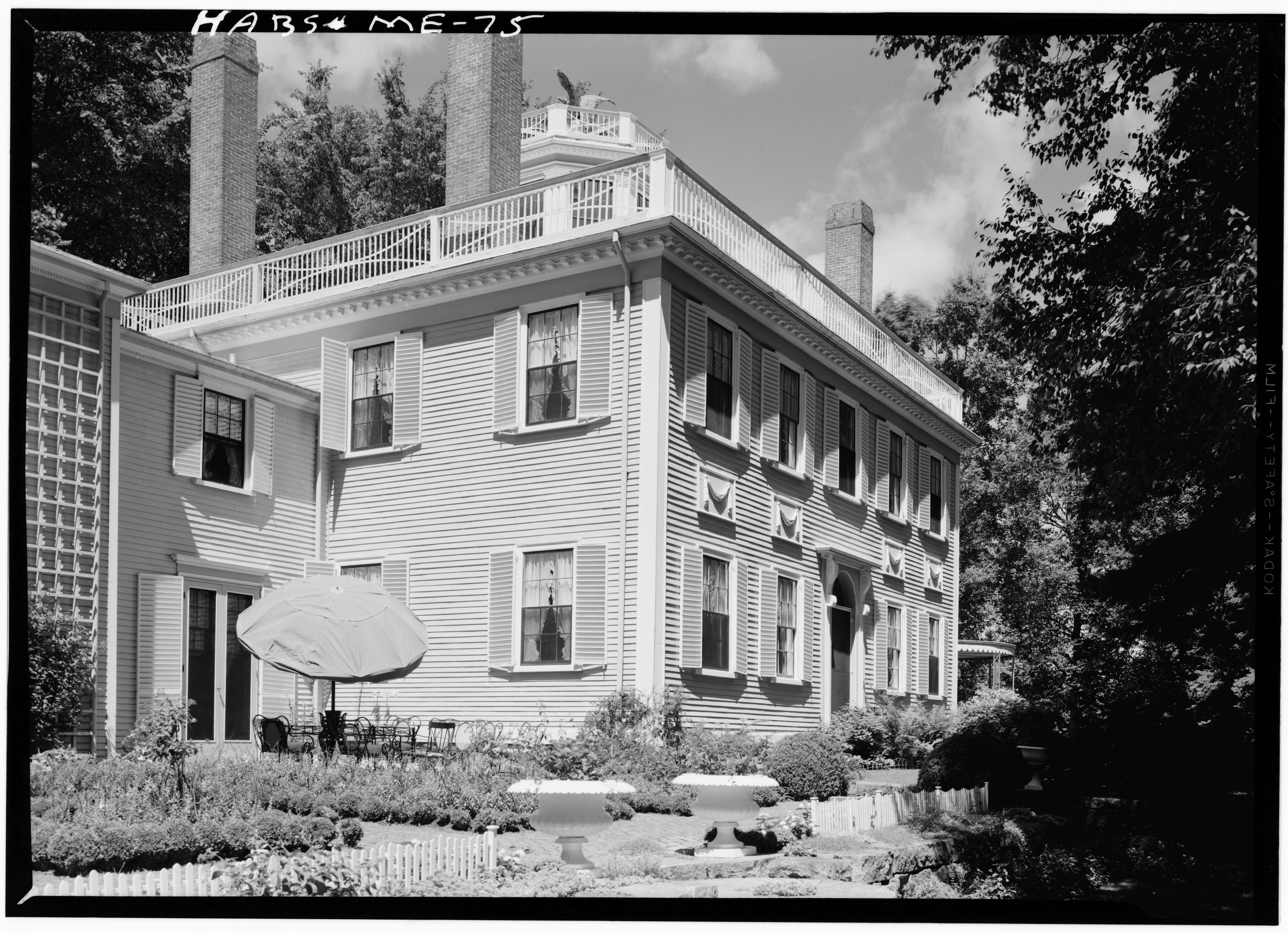
- HABS photo, 1960

- Location within Maine Location within the United States
- Location: Deadman's Point, Rockport, Maine
- Coordinates: 44°10′31″N 69°3′18″W
- Built: 1806
- Architectural style: Federal
- NRHP reference No.: 74000175
- Added to NRHP: August 13, 1974

The Spite House, also known as the Thomas McCobb House, is a historic house at Deadman's Point in Rockport, Maine. Built in 1806 in Phippsburg, it is a high quality example of Federal period architecture. It was built by Thomas McCobb as a deliberately elaborate building to exceed in quality the fine house in which he had grown up, which he had lost in a family dispute. It was moved to its current location in 1925, and was listed on the National Register of Historic Places in 1974.

== Description and history ==
The Spite House stands on the east side of Deadman's Point, the easternmost projection of the peninsula which separates Rockport Harbor from Penobscot Bay. It is a large two-story wood-frame structure with a central hip-roofed main section flanked by wings extending to the north and south. The walls are finished in wooden clapboards, and the building rests on original granite slabs set on a 1925 concrete foundation. The roof is pierced by four tall brick chimneys, each with a band of corbelling near the top. The roof is encircled by a balustrade, and has an octagonal cupola at its center, also topped by a balustrade. The main facade is five bays wide, with simple corner trim rising to a plain entablature and modillioned cornice. Windows are sash with shutters and there are decorative panels between the floors. The main entrance is framed by pilasters and topped by a half-round window and deep cornice supported by scrolled brackets.

James McCobb, an Irish immigrant, arrived in what is now Phippsburg in 1731. Living in a log cabin with his Irish-born wife, Beatrice, he raised a large family of 10 children, among whom was Thomas McCobb, who became a sea captain. In 1774, James built a handsome Federal period house for his second wife, Hannah Nichol, with whom he had three children (twin daughters, and a second son, also named Thomas). He married a third time in 1782 to Mary Langdon Storer Hill, who had a son, Mark Langdon Hill, from a previous marriage, who ended up marrying one of McCobb's daughters, one of the twins, who was a half-sister to Thomas. While Captain Thomas McCobb was away at sea, the Hills, which included Thomas' half-sister /wife of Mark Langdon Hill, and his second step-mother Mary Langdon Hill, broke James McCobb's will and claimed his house for their family. When Captain Thomas McCobb returned from his voyage and discovered what had happened, he resolved to build what became known as a spite house, deliberately near the old homestead and much more elaborate. This house was built in 1806. Ironically, Captain Thomas apparently never married and left no descendants, as a result, when he died the house was given over to the Hill family. In 1925, it was rescued from demolition by being moved to Rockport, at which time the extensive wings were added.

== See also ==
- National Register of Historic Places listings in Knox County, Maine
- Spite house
