= Hollensbury Spite House =

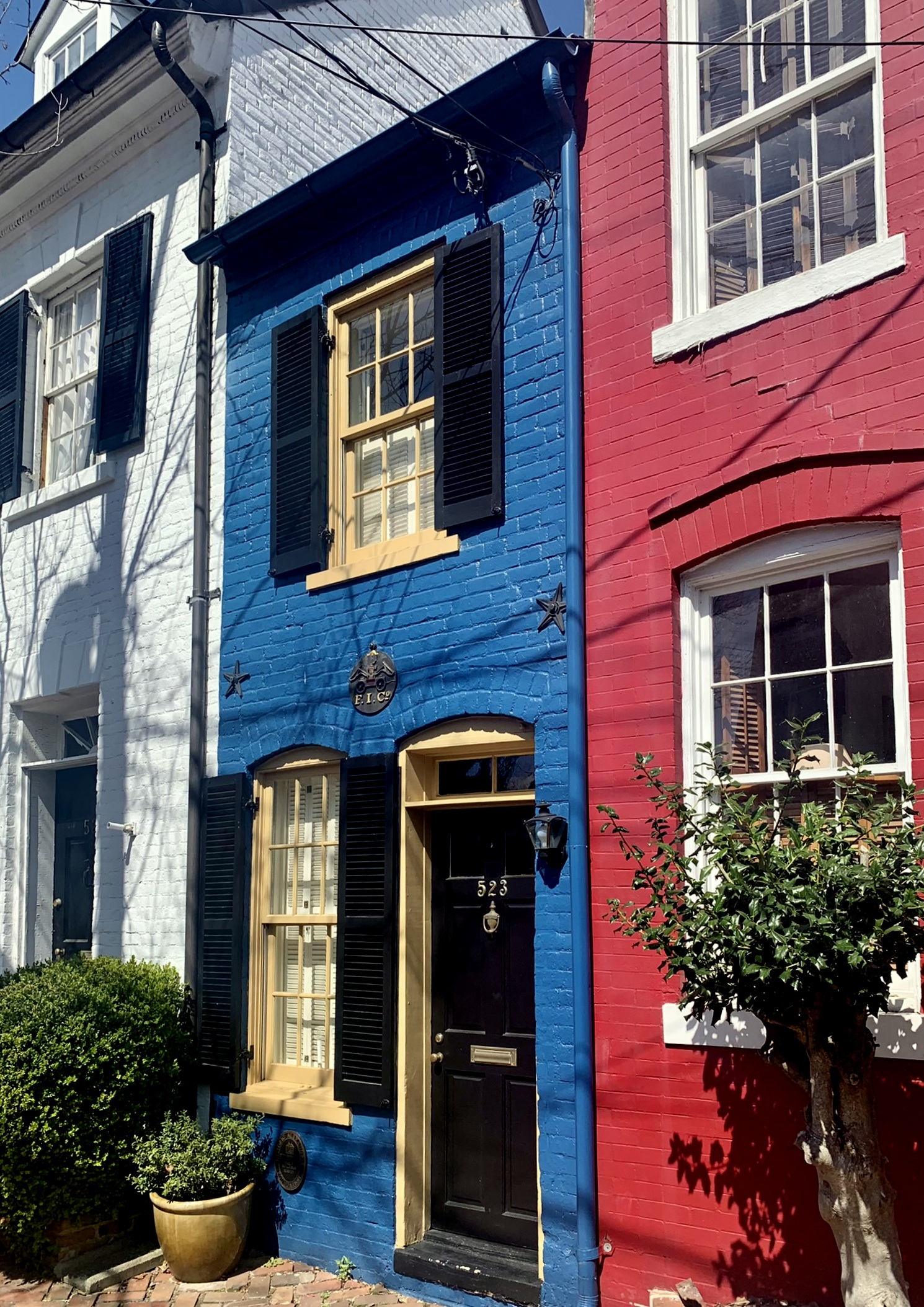
- Hollensbury Spite House in 2022

General information
- Architectural style: Federal
- Location: 523 Queen Street, Alexandria, Virginia, United States
- Coordinates: 38°48′25.9″N 77°2′42.3″W
- Completed: 1830

The Hollensbury Spite House is a spite house located at 523 Queen Street in Alexandria, Virginia. The narrow building measures 7-feet 6-inches (2.3 m) wide and is often called the skinniest house in the United States. The house has drawn international attention, being covered by numerous news outlets, and was once featured on The Oprah Winfrey Show. It is frequently visited by tourists who often pose in front of the building and is also included on local history tours. The house is 350 square-feet (32.5 sq m) but also includes an outdoor patio and garden, providing additional entertaining space. Because of its narrow front door and small interior space, the house is decorated with smaller furniture pieces and antiques.

The building's namesake, John Hollensbury, reportedly built the house in 1830 to stop people loitering in the alley adjoining his house and to prevent wagon-wheel hubs from damaging the house's exterior walls. This is the most commonly known story as to why the house was built, but there are also two other possibilities, the first being due to a dispute with his neighbor, and the second as a gift to his two daughters. Whichever story is true, the scenario involving a man who built a home out of spite is the one that has made the Hollensbury Spite House a local landmark. It is one of four spite houses in Alexandria, the others being built in the 1800s as well.

== History ==
=== Original owner and construction ===
John Hollensbury, a brickmaker and city council member in Alexandria, Virginia, lived in a home on Queen Street that was built in 1780 and stood next to an alley. There are three stories on how the small building next to Hollensbury's house came to be. The best known story is that Hollensbury grew tired of people loitering in the alley as well as the horse-drawn wagons, which left gouges on his home's exterior wall with their wagon-wheel hubs. He bought the alley lot at 523 Queen Street for $45.65 and in 1830 built a small house out of spite measuring 7-feet 6-inches (2.3 m) wide and 25-feet (7.6 m) deep to prevent others from further damaging his walls and to reduce noise. The reasoning behind constructing the house and its unusual size earned it the nickname "Spitehouse."

The second story of the building's history is that Hollensbury and his neighbor who lived at 521 Queen Street were at one time good friends, but due to the neighbor's carriage damaging Hollensbury's house and a fallout in their friendship in the late 1820s, Hollensbury decided to build the small house. The third and final story is that Hollensbury built a playhouse for his two daughters, Julia and Harriett, and that one of them later lived in the house as an adult.

The neighbor's house at 521 Queen Street was at some point demolished after the alley house was built and the current building was constructed in 1870. At one point the alley house was connected to the original house built by Hollensbury. When the buildings were separated the address for the alley house became 523 Queen Street and the older home built by Hollensbury was given the address 525 Queen Street.

A building code enforcement architect for Alexandria studied the alley house, which was built using the existing walls of the two adjoining houses, and thinks the story of it being built out of spite is exaggerated and that it was probably intended for additional living space: "Whether that made somebody angry who thought they had a right of passage through that alley, it probably did. I think that story has an interesting appeal on a walking tour, but I think it's probably a bit exaggerated."

=== Later history ===
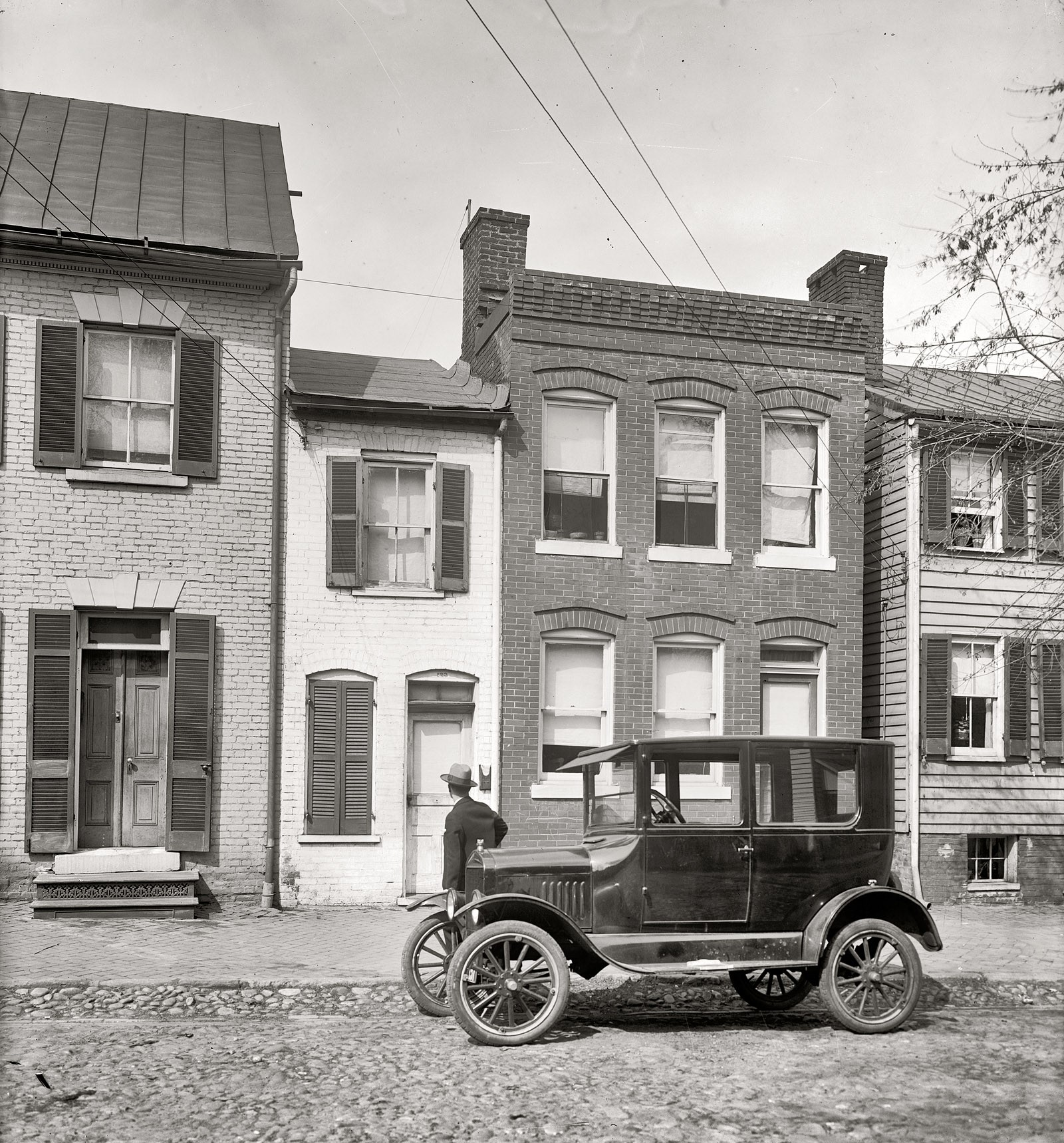
The house in 1924

According to local historians, the Hollensbury Spite House was later used as a school and then reverted to residential use, with one family reportedly fitting a bed and crib in the small bedroom. In 1990 businessman Jack Sammis, who founded IMN Solutions and grew up in a narrow rowhouse in Baltimore, Maryland, saw a listing in the newspaper that the Spite House was for sale, the first time it had been on the market in 25 years. Later that day he signed a contract to purchase the home for $130,000. According to Sammis, "I used to walk by it every day when I worked near [the house], and when it was listed in the paper, I knew right away what house it was. I bought it the first day it was shown."

Sammis wasn't sure what to do with the building after he bought it: "I knew I wouldn't live in it full time. It just seemed like too good of an opportunity to pass up." Sammis hired interior design consultant Matt Hannan from Quicksburg, Virginia, to redesign the rear walled patio area. He also hired Hannan to redesign the interior space, with Hannan living in the house during the year it was being renovated. Original details such as the wooden floors and brick walls were highlighted and architectural features that reflect the time it was built were also added. The heating and cooling system was moved to the attic and the water heater, which had been in the kitchen, was moved to an upstairs closet. A stacked washer-dryer unit was also installed in an upstairs closet. Due to the size of the front door, large furniture could not be brought in, so Hannan purchased smaller pieces from local antique stores.

Sammis' wife, commercial real estate agent Colleen, had been interested in the house before the two married. While having dinner with friends in 2006, Colleen learned that Jack owned the Spite House: "I said: 'Wait a minute. You own the Spite House?' I had heard about the house, I had read about the house, but I had never seen it." The couple married the following year and had a post-reception event at the house with around 25 people in attendance, utilizing the small garden and patio to accommodate the crowd.

As of 2008, the couple uses the house mostly as a weekend retreat during the summer months, where the two can walk to the farmer's market, restaurants, and parks. Their primary residence is in nearby Arlington. The Spite House is the couple's favorite property, with Colleen saying "I deal with commercial spaces, and this house is so different. I love the idea of it — that something like this can exist. It makes the world a little more magical." The house is most often used for friends or clients of the couple as a type of bed and breakfast. The space was once rented by a couple who had made plans to travel around the world on a cruise ship and wanted to know if they could handle living in a confined space for an extended period.

The Hollensbury Spite House, which is a local landmark, is often called the skinniest house in the United States and was once featured on The Oprah Winfrey Show. It has been featured in articles on the world's smallest houses by CBS News, Architectural Digest, Bloomberg News, and The Guardian. The house is a frequent stop on guided tours of the Alexandria Historic District and tourists frequently stop to take photos of or in front of the house, stretching their arms out to show how small the building is. On occasion people knock on the front door to ask if they can take a tour of the house. According to Sammis "It's on napkins and cards that show Old Town scenes. It’s always on the Christmas tour."

=== Other spite houses ===
The Hollensbury Spite House is one of four spite houses in Alexandria, which most likely were built as alley houses to save on costs. The oldest of the other spite houses is 205 King Street, which was built around 1812 and measures 11-feet 9-inches (3.6 m) wide. It has served as a private residence, cobbler's shop, and boutique store. The house located at 403 Prince Street measures 7-feet 9-inches (2.4 m) wide. It was built sometime before 1883, most likely by Samuel Janney, who bequeathed the house and the adjoining property to his son, Henry. The fourth spite house is located at 1401 Prince Street. It measures 8-feet 2-inches (2.5 m) wide and unlike the others, it's a one-story building. The house was constructed sometime in the 1890s and has been incorporated into the adjoining building.

Other spite houses in Alexandria
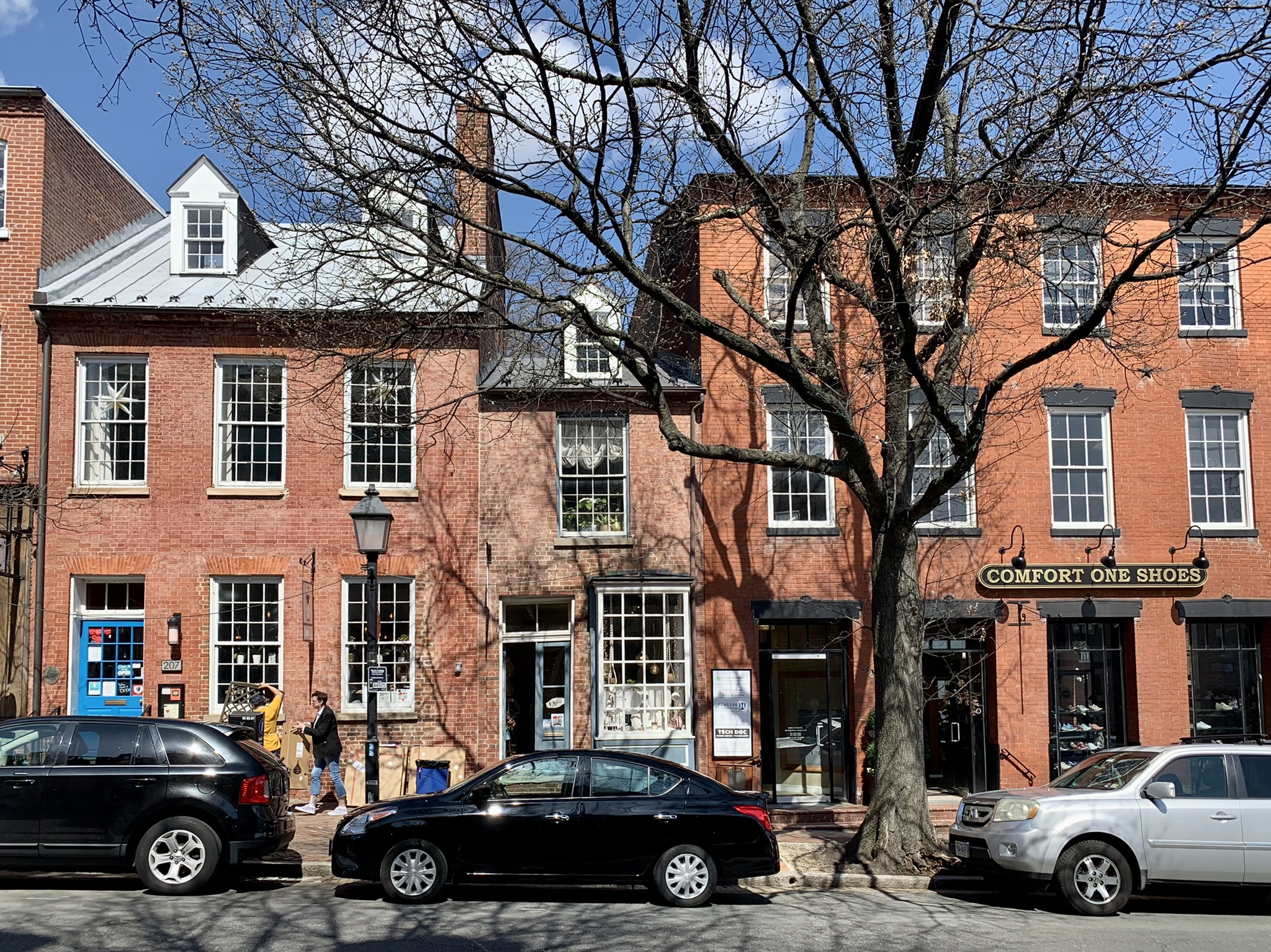
205 King Street (built c. 1812)

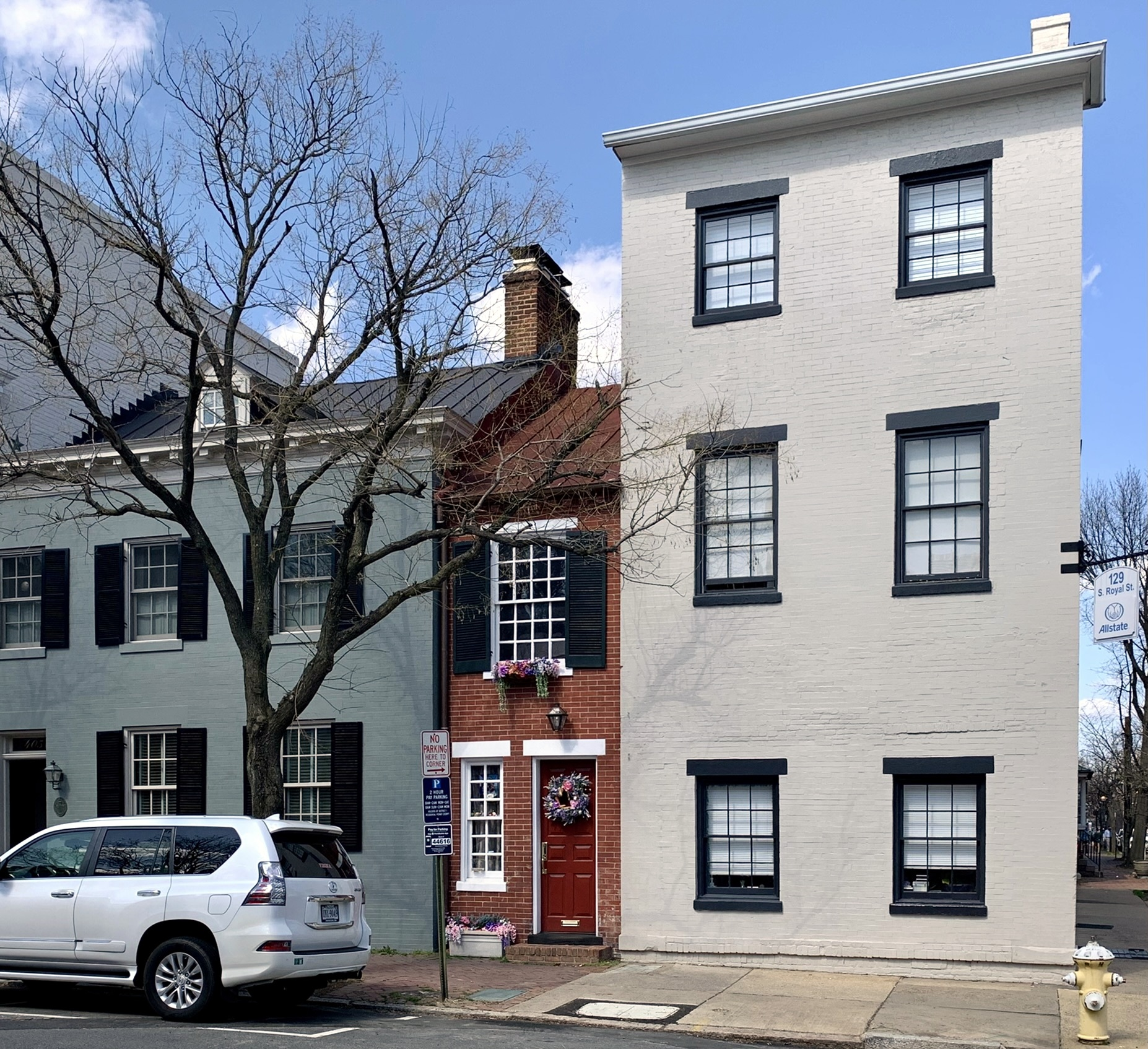
403 Prince Street (built 1800s)

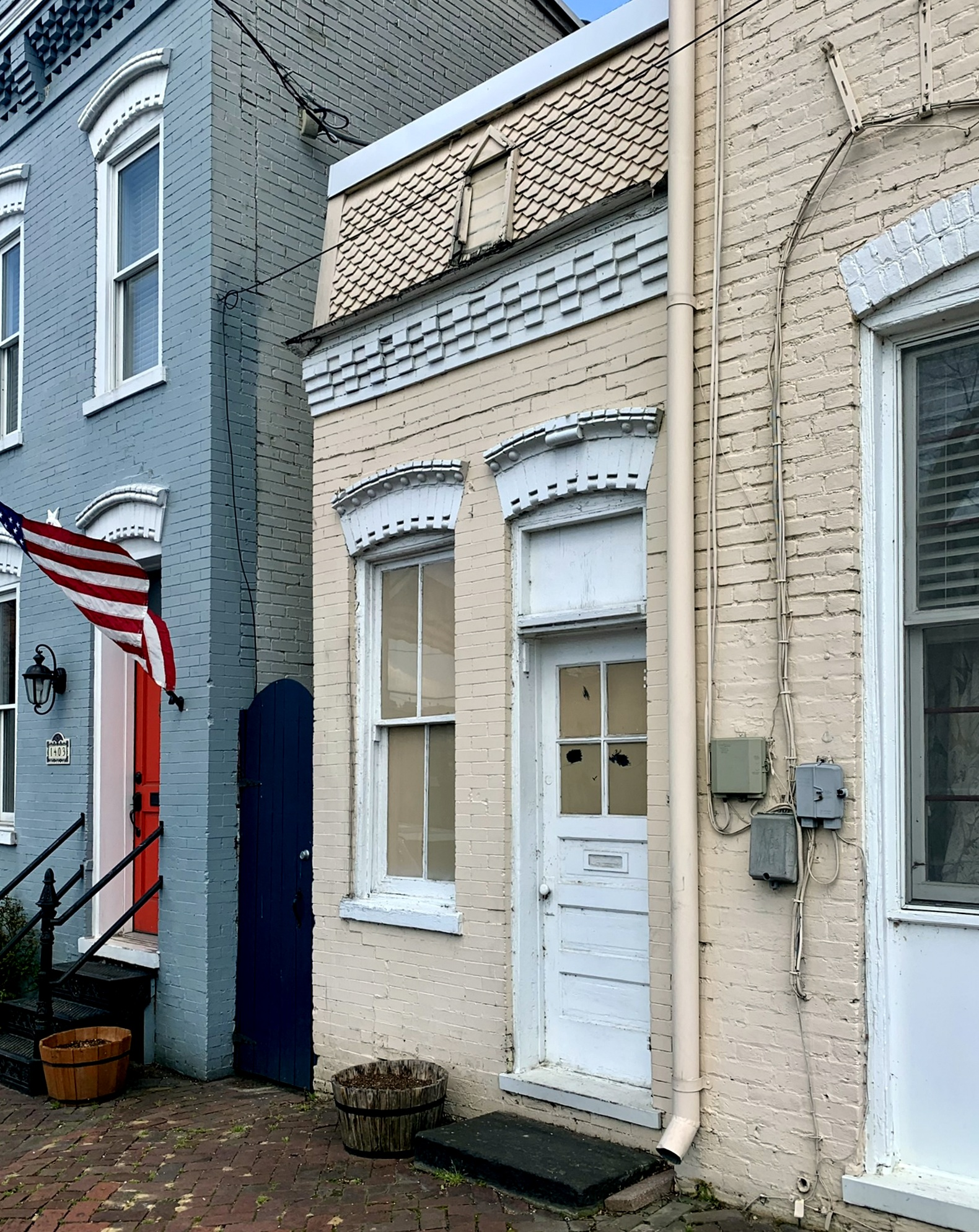
1401 Prince Street (built 1890s)

== Property layout ==
The Hollensbury Spite House is located at 523 Queen Street in Old Town Alexandria and measures 7-feet 6-inches (2.3 m) wide and 25 feet (7.6 m) deep. The lot measures 356 square feet (33 sq m), which includes the 350-square-foot (32.5 sq m) two-story house and a walled rear garden and patio area, measuring 7 feet (2.1 m) wide and 12 feet (3.7 m) deep. As of 2022, the land is valued at $381,150, and the building is valued at $220,524, with the total property value being $601,674.

The exterior of the house is painted bright blue and a cast-iron fire shield hangs on the façade, a feature added in the 19th century to note that a property owner had paid the local fire company to extinguish any fires that might happen at the house. After entering through the narrow front door, there are exposed ceiling beams and painted walls in the living room. There is also a black wooden mantel above a faux fireplace along with a couch and chair. Behind the living room, a small cupboard and microwave are under the narrow wooden stairwell. Beyond the stairwell is a galley kitchen featuring a sink, a four-burner gas range, a small refrigerator and freezer under the counter, and tall cabinets with open shelving. There is a built-in bench at the end of the kitchen counter that when pulled out, provides a fourth seat at the small dining table. Behind the kitchen is the rear entrance featuring French doors that leads to the patio and garden.

Once upstairs there is a claw-footed bathtub with a shower in the rear room. Additional storage space, including closets for the stacked washer and dryer and water heater, lines the narrow hallway that leads to the bedroom. There is a large window in the bedroom overlooking Queen Street. A television is inside one of the painted cabinets that are on either side of the window and the double bed is laid out sideways, with the wall acting as the headboard.

== Notes ==
1. The purchase price was reported as $125,000 by The Washington Post and $135,000 by The New York Times, but the city's property database reports it as $130,000.
