= Cleombrotus of Ambracia =

Cleombrotus (later referred to as Cleombrotus of Ambracia; Greek: Κλεόμβροτος) is a young man mentioned in Plato's Phaedo as one of two young men notably absent when Socrates drank the hemlock. This is his only mention in Plato, but a later tradition added that he was from Ambracia; Callimachus explains that Cleombrotus committed suicide in a way that caused a debate still held in the time of Michel de Montaigne—whether his suicide, leaping into the ocean to enter the life of the spirits after reading the Phaedo, was foolish or not. As translated by Henry William Tytler, Callimachus's epigram reads:

Cleombrotus, high on a rock,
Above Ambracia stood,
Bade Sol adieu, and, as he spoke,
Plung'd headlong in the flood.

From no mischance the leap he took,
But sought the realms beneath,
Because he read in Plato's book,
That souls live after death.
