= Spite house =

House designed to annoy neighbors

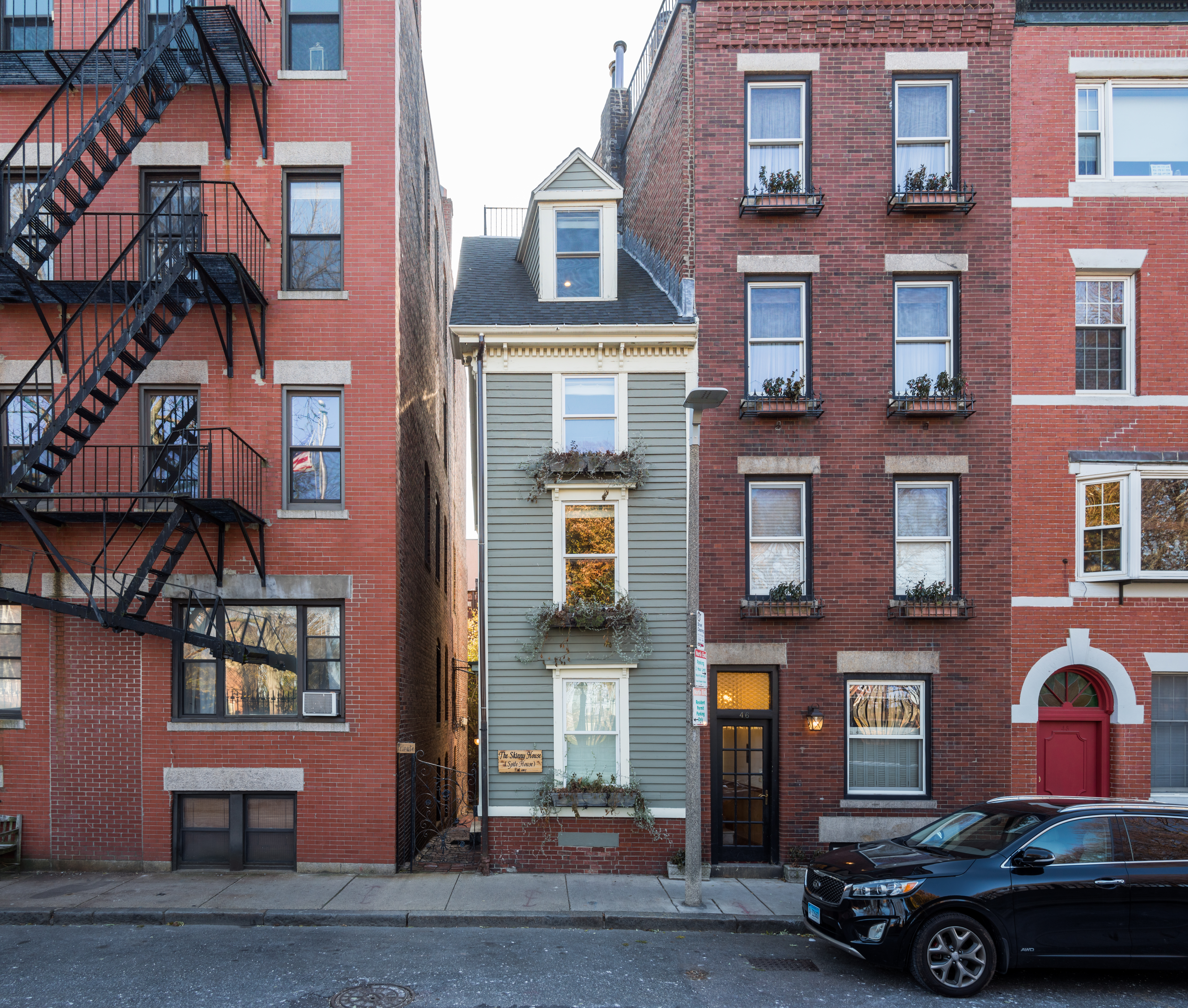
The Skinny House in Boston, Massachusetts, was built many times by a man who inherited only a small patch of land, to spite his neighbor by blocking his view.

A spite house is a building constructed or substantially modified to irritate neighbors or any party with land stakes. Because long-term occupation is not the primary purpose of these houses, they frequently exhibit strange and impractical structures.

== Purpose ==
Spite houses may deliberately obstruct light, block access to neighboring buildings, or be flagrant symbols of defiance. Spite houses are a particularly local kind of hostile architecture meant to annoy/irritate a particular person.

Although, in the US, homeowners generally have no right to views, light, or air, neighbors can sue for a negative easement. In instances regarding a spite build, courts are far more likely to side with the neighboring parties which may have been affected by that build. For example, the Coty v. Ramsey Associates, Inc. case of 1988 ruled that the defendant's spite farm constituted a nuisance, granting the neighboring landowner a negative easement.

Spite houses, as well as spite farms, are considerably rarer than spite fences. This is partially because modern building codes often prevent the construction of houses likely to impinge on neighbors' views or privacy, but mostly because fence construction is far cheaper, quicker, and easier than building construction. There are also similar structures known as spite walls or blinder walls.

In certain jurisdictions, construction of spite houses or spite fences is considered abuse of rights. In some countries, like Finland, it is explicitly prohibited by law.

Spite houses can also be built to take advantage of property laws or zoning restrictions, rather than simply to annoy neighbors. Some have been designed to block sunlight, obstruct views, or prevent access to nearby properties.

== Examples ==
=== Old Spite House, Marblehead, MA ===
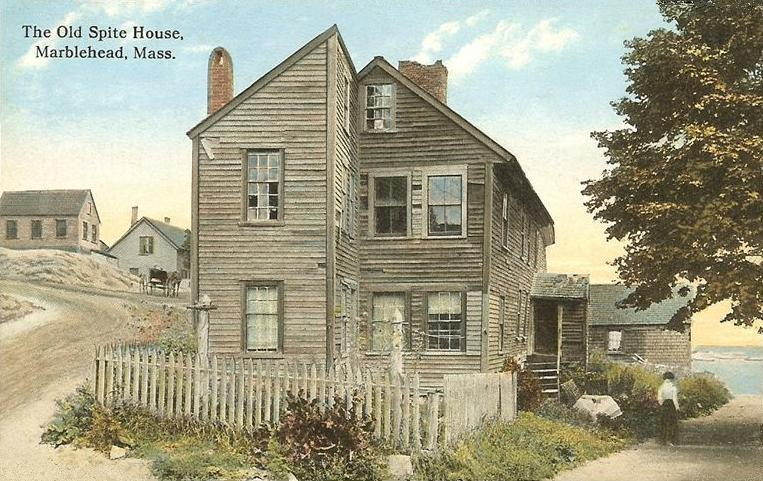
The Old Spite House of Marblehead, Massachusetts, in 1912

In 1716, Thomas Wood, a sailmaker, built a house in Marblehead, Massachusetts, that subsequently became known as the Old Spite House. One possibility is that it was inhabited by two brothers who occupied different sections, would not speak to each other, and each refused to sell to the other. Another explanation is that the ten-foot-wide (3 m) house, just tall enough to block the view of two other houses on Orne Street, was built because its owner was upset about his tiny share of his father's estate and therefore decided to spoil his older brothers' views. The Old Spite House is still standing and occupied.

=== McCobb Spite House, Rockport, ME ===
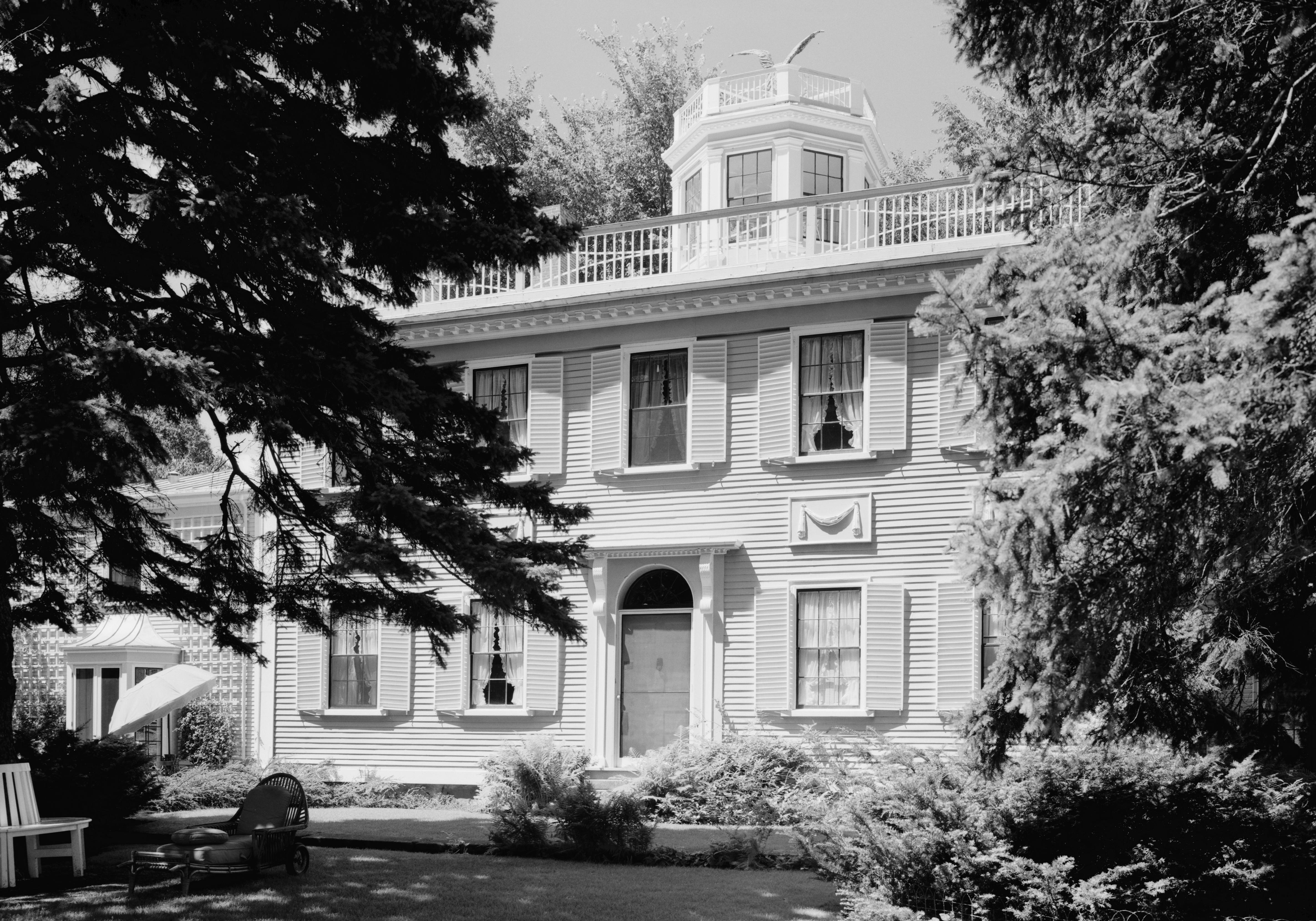
The McCobb Spite House at Deadman's Point in July 1960

In 1806, Thomas McCobb, heir to his father's land and shipbuilding business, returned home to Phippsburg, Maine, from sea to discover that his stepmother had inherited the family "Mansion in the Wilderness". Upset about his loss, McCobb built a house directly across from the McCobb mansion to spite his stepmother. The National Park Service's Historic American Buildings Survey photographed and documented the 1925 move of the McCobb Spite House by barge from Phippsburg to Deadman's Point in Rockport, Maine.

=== Tyler Spite House, Frederick, MD ===
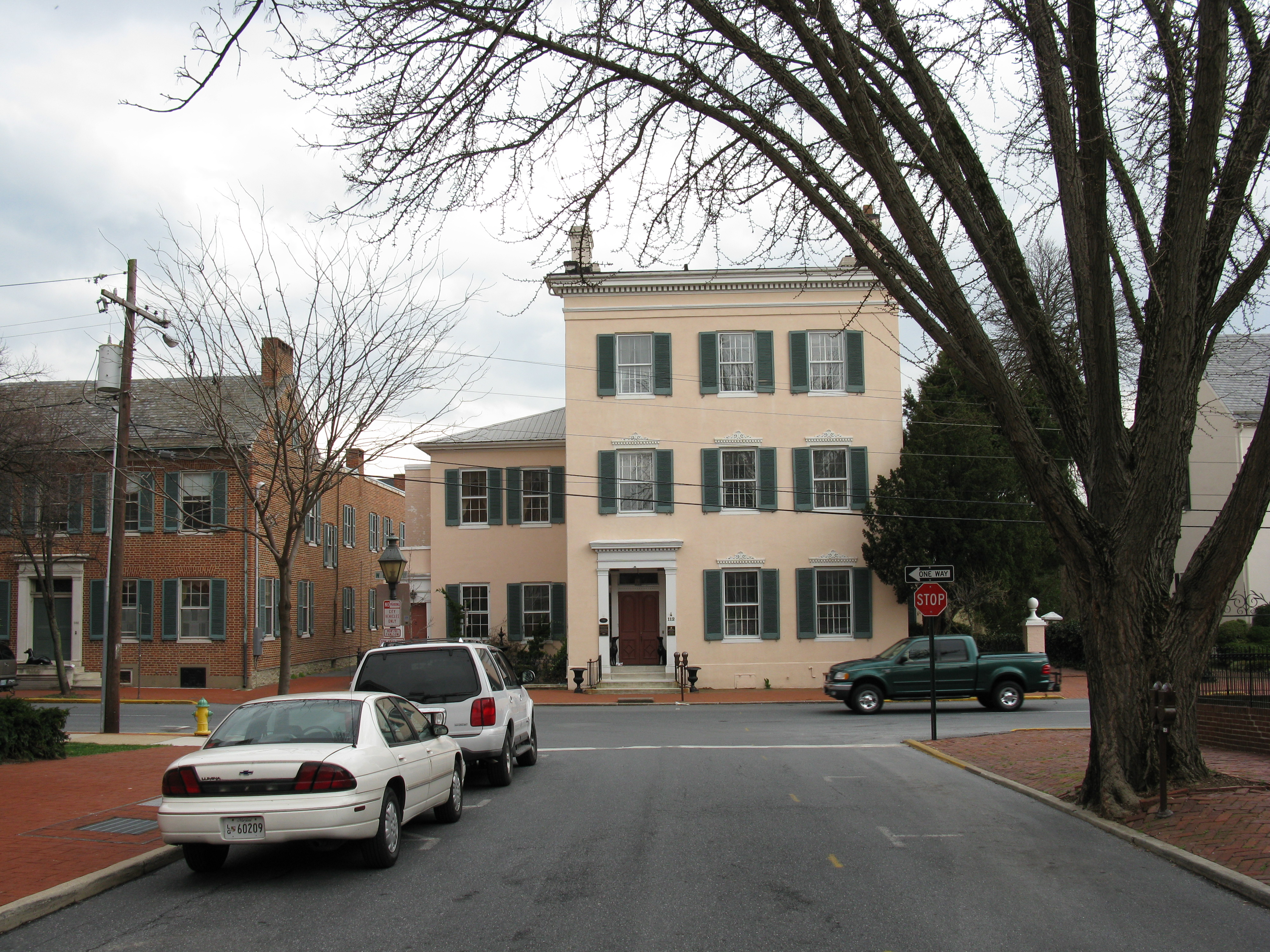
The Tyler Spite House in Frederick, Maryland. It is located at the southern terminus of Record Street.

In 1814, John Tyler, an ophthalmologist and one of the first American-born physicians to perform a cataract operation, owned a parcel of land near the courthouse square in Frederick, Maryland. The city made plans to extend Record Street south through Tyler's land to meet West Patrick Street. In fighting the city, Tyler discovered a local law that prevented the building of a road if work was in progress on a substantial building in the path of a proposed road. To spite the city, Tyler immediately had workmen pour a building foundation, which was discovered by the road crews the next morning.

=== Hollensbury Spite House, Alexandria, VA ===
In 1830, John Hollensbury's home in Alexandria, Virginia, was one of two houses that directly bordered an alley that attracted an annoying lot of horse-drawn wagon traffic and loiterers. To prevent people from using the alleyway, Hollensbury constructed a 7-foot-wide (2.1 m), 25-foot-deep (7.6 m), 325-square-foot (30.2 m^{2}), two-story house using the existing brick walls of the adjacent houses for the sides of the new one. The brick walls of the Hollensbury Spite House living room have gouges from wagon-wheel hubs, and the house is still standing and occupied.

=== Skinny House, Boston, MA ===
The Skinny House in Boston is considered a spite house. One story of its creation tells that in 1874, two brothers in the North End of Boston, Massachusetts, got into a dispute. Each had previously inherited land from their deceased father. While the second brother was away serving in the military, the first brother built himself a large home, leaving the soldier only a shred of property that the first brother felt certain was too tiny to build on. When the soldier returned, he found his inheritance depleted and built a wooden house at 44 Hull St. to spite his brother by blocking the sunlight and ruining his view. The outside of the house spans 10.4 feet (3.2 m) and tapers to 9.25 feet (2.82 m) in the rear.

=== Schilling Spite House, Hiawatha, KS ===
In 1880, Adam Schilling owned a tract of 80 acres (32 ha) adjoining the town of Hiawatha, Kansas. Schilling sold three-quarters of an acre of this land, on which a house eventually was built and became owned by James Falloon. Together, the 80 acres (320,000 m^{2}) were well-suited to add to the town of Hiawatha, but Falloon refused to sell his three-quarters of an acre at the low price Schilling offered. To spite his neighbor, Schilling then built a cheap tenement house on his own property 13 feet (4.0 m) from Falloon's with the "idea of rendering Falloon's home obnoxious and unendurable to Falloon and family" by renting to people Falloon might find objectionable.

=== Richardson Spite House, New York City ===
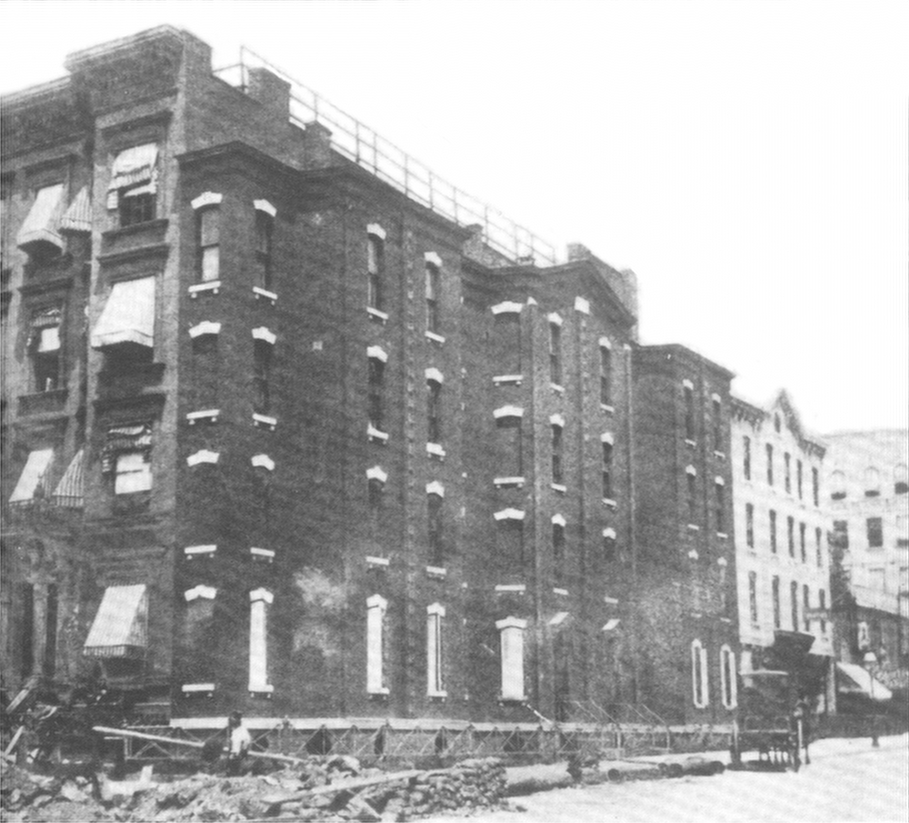
The Richardson Spite House in 1895

The Richardson Spite House in New York City at Lexington Avenue and 82nd Street was built in 1882 and demolished in 1915. It was four stories tall, 104 feet (31.7 m) long, and only five feet (1.5 m) wide. Joseph Richardson, the owner of the plot, built it after the owner of an adjacent plot, Hyman Sarner, unsuccessfully tried to purchase the land. Sarner considered the plot useless by itself and offered only $1000; Richardson demanded $5000. After the deal fell through, Richardson had an apartment building constructed on his land. It was a functional (albeit impractical) apartment building with eight suites, each consisting of three rooms and a bath.

=== Waldorf Hotel, New York City ===
In the early 1890s, in the Astor family, William Waldorf Astor's mansion was next door to that of his aunt, Caroline Webster Schermerhorn Astor, on the block later occupied by the Empire State Building. He and his aunt did not get along well, and William replaced his mansion with a hotel, the original Waldorf Hotel, in 1893. The building not only towered over his aunt's home, but also had no windows at all on the side facing the aunt's mansion.

=== Salem Spite House, Salem, MA ===
At some point before 1898, a house was erected in Salem, Massachusetts, to "cut off the view of a neighbor". After the owner died, his heirs agreed in 1898 to have the Salem Spite House torn down to avoid a "vexatious lawsuit with the obnoxious neighbor".

=== Collinsville Spite House, Collinsville, CT ===
In the 19th century, a butcher in Collinsville, Connecticut, feuded with his neighbor. To spite his neighbor, the butcher built between their adjoining houses a narrow, two-story structure with windows covered by Venetian blinds. The wooden building located between 23 and 25 River St. was the width of a standard stairway and allowed the butcher to block the sun to the neighbor's home and block the neighbor's view of the butcher's property at will. The butcher's son got along with the family next door and eventually tore down the Collinsville Spite House.

=== Freeport Spite House, Freeport, NY ===
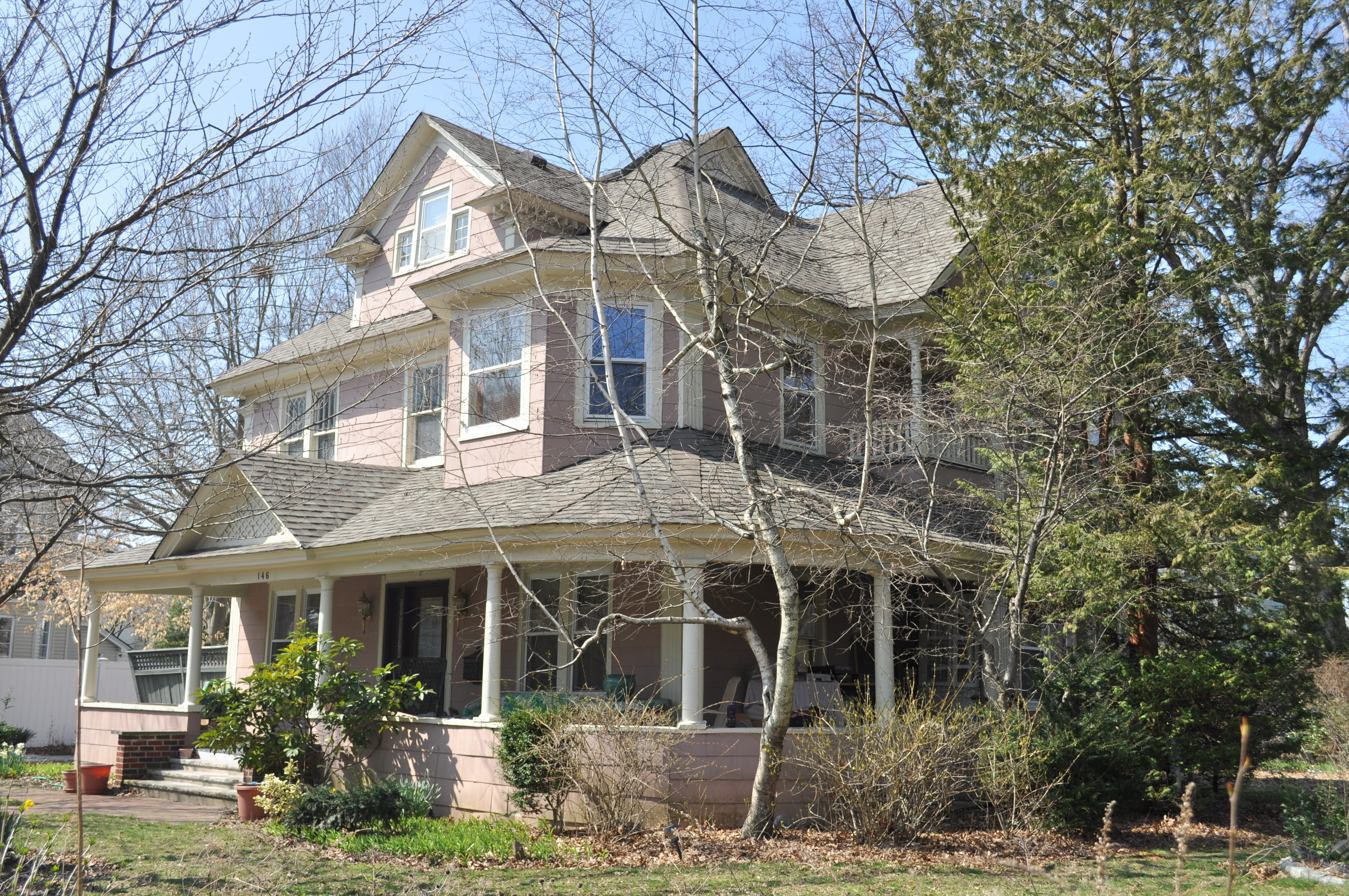
Developer John Randall's unusual "Freeport Spite House" or "Miracle House" blocked a rival developer's plan for the route of Freeport, New York's Lena Avenue.

Also in the 19th century, a Freeport, New York, developer who opposed all of Freeport's being laid out in a grid put up a Victorian house virtually overnight on a triangular plot at the corner of Lena Avenue and Wilson Place to spite the grid designers. The Freeport Spite House is still standing and occupied.

=== Alameda Spite House, Alameda, CA ===
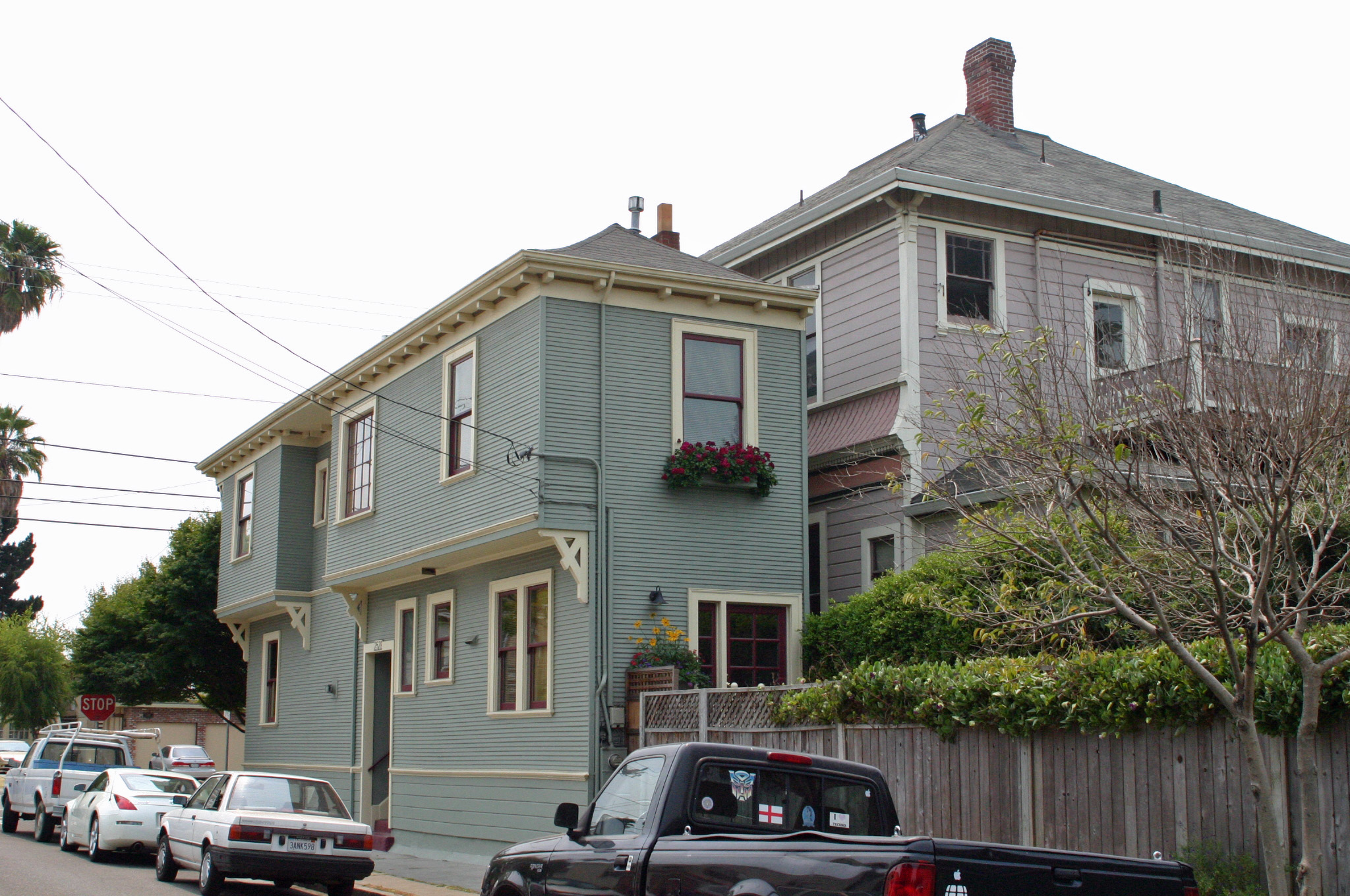
The Alameda Spite House, July 2008

At the turn of the 20th century, the city of Alameda, California, took a large portion of Charles Froling's land to build a street. Froling had planned to build his dream house on the plot of land he received through inheritance. To spite both the city and an unsympathetic neighbor, Froling built a house 10 feet (3.0 m) deep, 54 feet (16 m) long and 20 feet (6.1 m) high on the tiny strip of land left to him. He cantilevered the front-facing second story both to maximize floor space and preclude encroachment on zoning setbacks. The Alameda Spite House is still standing and occupied.

=== Edleston Spite House, Gainford, England ===
In 1904, the family of a deceased Joseph Edleston owned a plot of land next to the churchyard of St. Mary's in Gainford, England. The children asked to erect a monument in the churchyard in memory of Joseph's 41-year tenure at the church. The church refused permission, asserting that the churchyard was full but that the family could donate their land to the church and then build a monument on part of it. Feeling slighted, the family immediately set about building themselves a house on their land with a 40-foot (12 m) column erected next to the churchyard so it towered over the trees. The Edleston Spite House is still standing and occupied, and has MCMIV (1904) over the front door.

=== Spite Church, Brooklyn, NY ===
In 1907 there was a "spite" church in Brooklyn, New York. It was built to take advantage of a law that forbade the operation of saloons within a certain distance of churches. Saloon owners brought suit against the church, arguing that the church was not a real church and no worship was practiced. The saloon owners won the case.

=== O'Reilly Spite House, Cambridge, MA ===
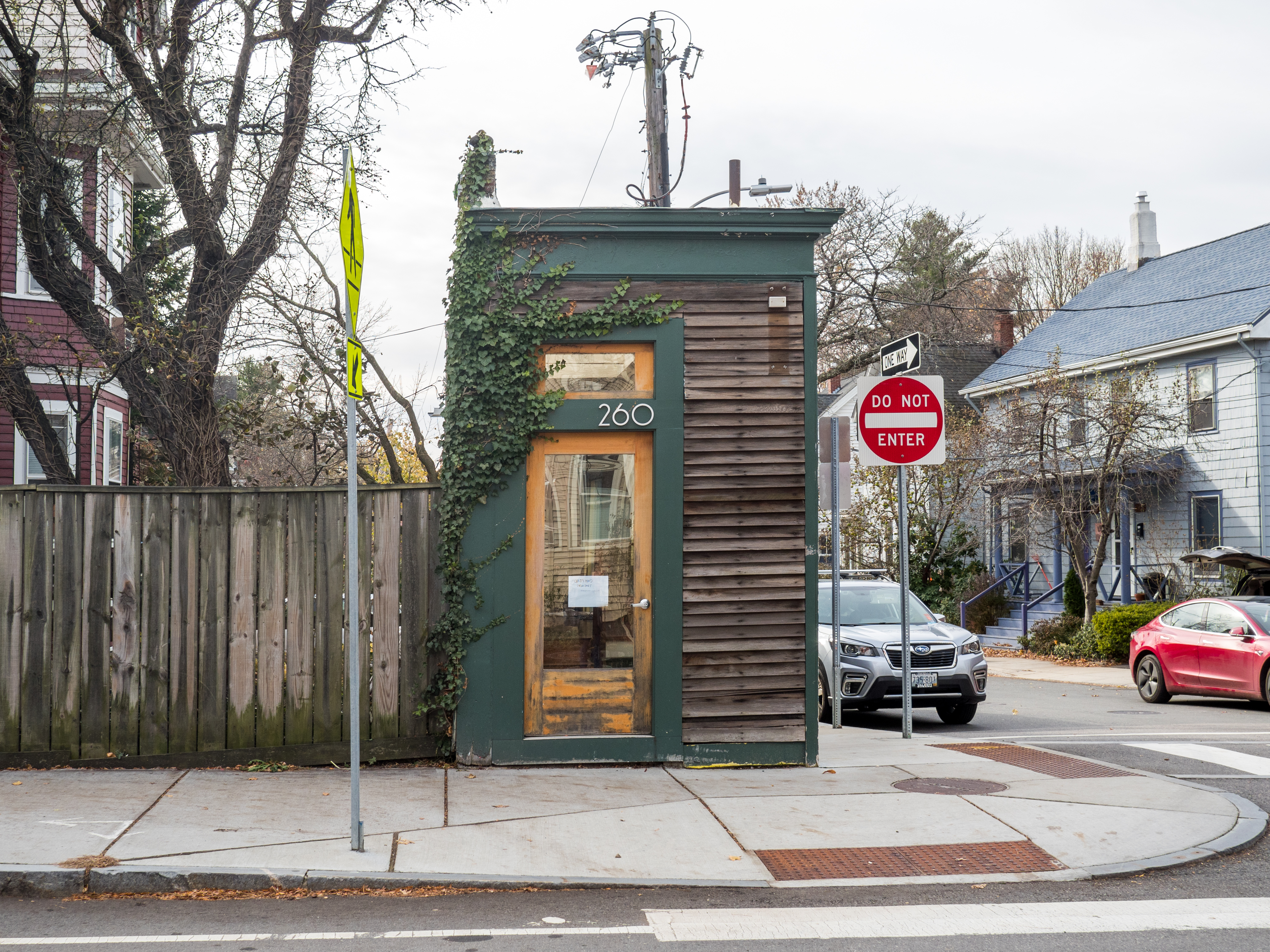
O'Reilly Spite House, West Cambridge, Massachusetts, 2019

In 1908, Francis O'Reilly owned an investment parcel of land in West Cambridge, Massachusetts, and approached his abutting land neighbor to sell the land for a gain. After the neighbor refused to buy the land, O'Reilly built a 308-square-foot (28.6 m^{2}) building, measuring 37 feet (11 m) long and only 8 feet (2.4 m) wide, to spite the neighbor. The O'Reilly Spite House is still standing and is occupied by a second-hand shop as of April 2026.

=== Sam Kee Building, Vancouver ===
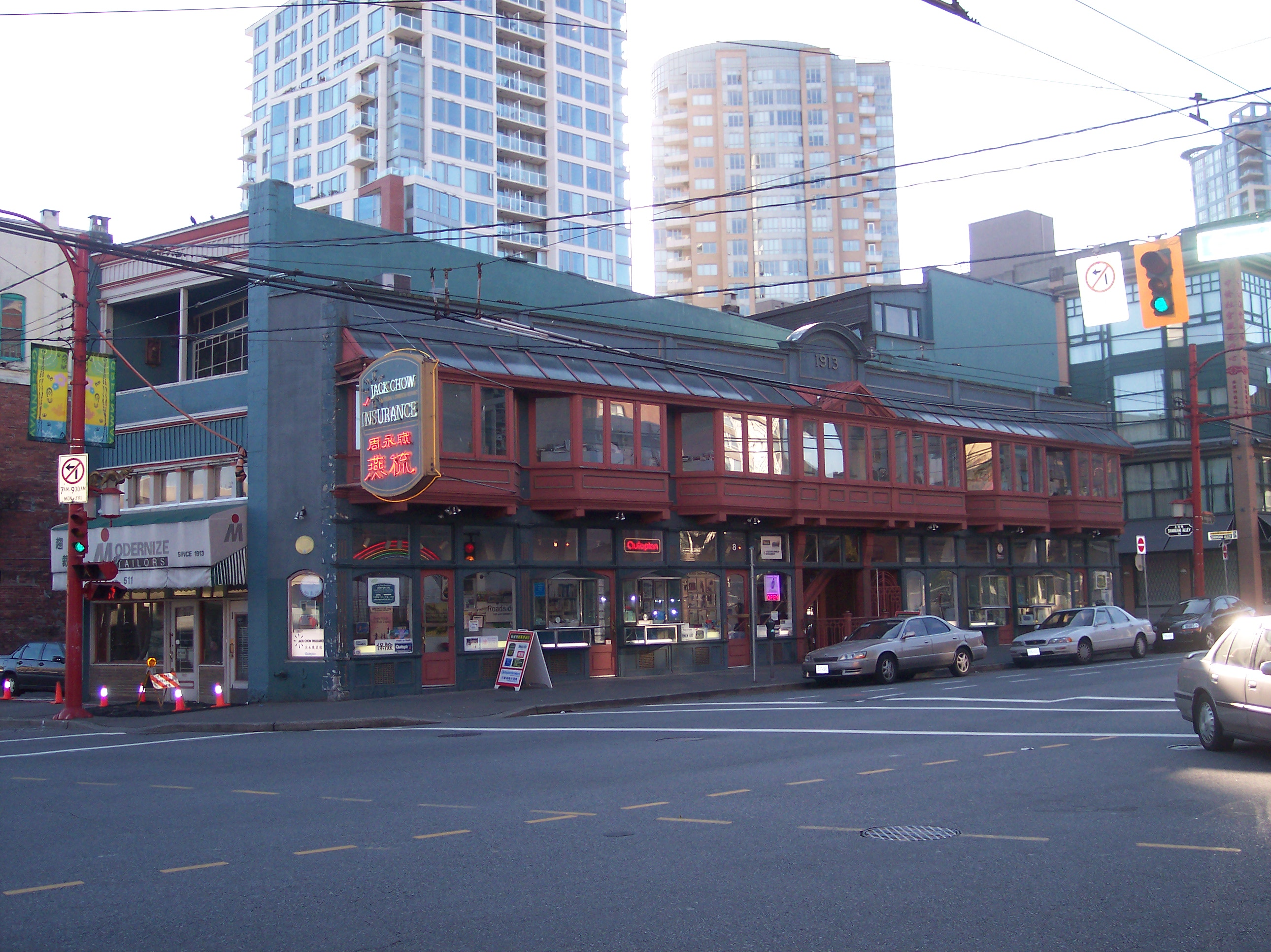
Sam Kee Building at Carrall and Pender Streets in Vancouver

The Sam Kee Building, built in 1913 in Vancouver, British Columbia, is a spite house and one of the narrowest commercial buildings in the world, considered the narrowest by Guinness World Records. The city widened the street and took a large part of Kee's land, who then built a 4-foot-11-inch-wide (1.5 m) building on the remaining very small parcel of land.

=== Sarajevo Spite House, Sarajevo ===
Before 1914, the Austro-Hungarians who ruled Sarajevo in Bosnia and Herzegovina wanted land in the Sarajevo Old Town district to build a city hall and library. The land had a house on it and, despite the offering of money to the owner, he refused and continued to refuse even when told that he had to move. When the officials threatened him, he moved the house and rebuilt it, piece by piece, on the other side of the Miljacka river, as a way of spiting the officials. The Sarajevo Spite House operates today as a restaurant called Inat Kuća (which means "Spite House" or "House of Contempt").

=== The Pink House, Newbury, MA ===
In 1922, The Pink House was built in Newbury, Massachusetts. According to local legend, as per the terms of a divorce settlement, a man was required to build an exact replica of his house for his now ex-wife, but since the wife had failed to specify where the house be built, he built in the Great Marsh on the edge of town with saltwater plumbing. The Pink House was demolished in 2025.

=== Montlake Spite House, Seattle, WA ===
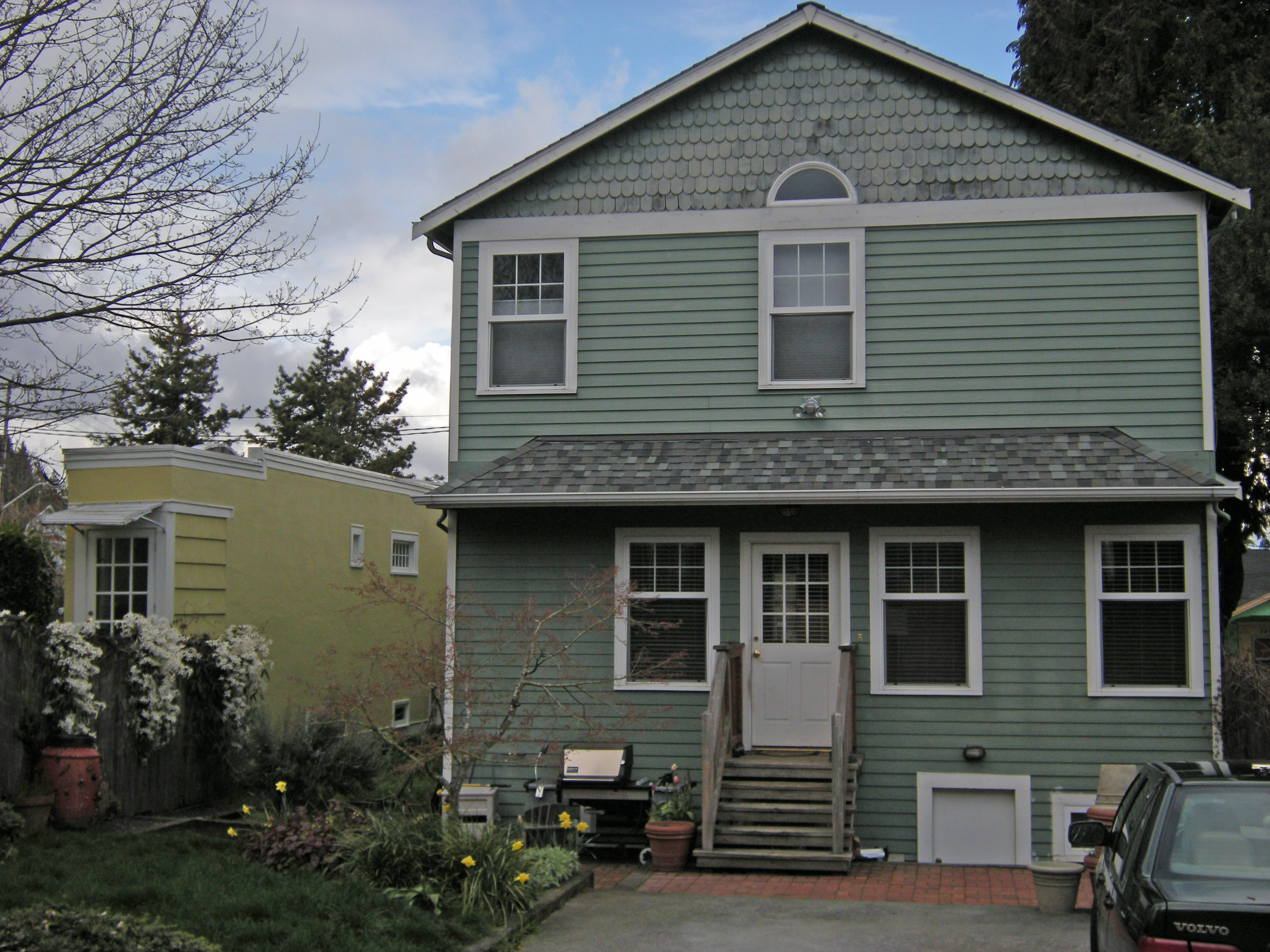
2008 alley view: the thin end of the Montlake Spite House (left) and the house it blocks from 24th

In 1925, according to one common story, a Montlake, Seattle, Washington neighbor made an insultingly low offer for a tiny slice of adjoining land. Out of spite for the low offer, the builder built an 860-square-foot (80 m^{2}) house that blocked the neighbors' open space. However, there are other stories about how the house came to be, making its origins murky. The house is 55 inches (1.4 m) wide at the south end, and 15 feet (4.6 m) wide at the north end. As of 2025, the Montlake Spite House was still standing and occupied.

=== Skinny Building, Pittsburgh, PA ===
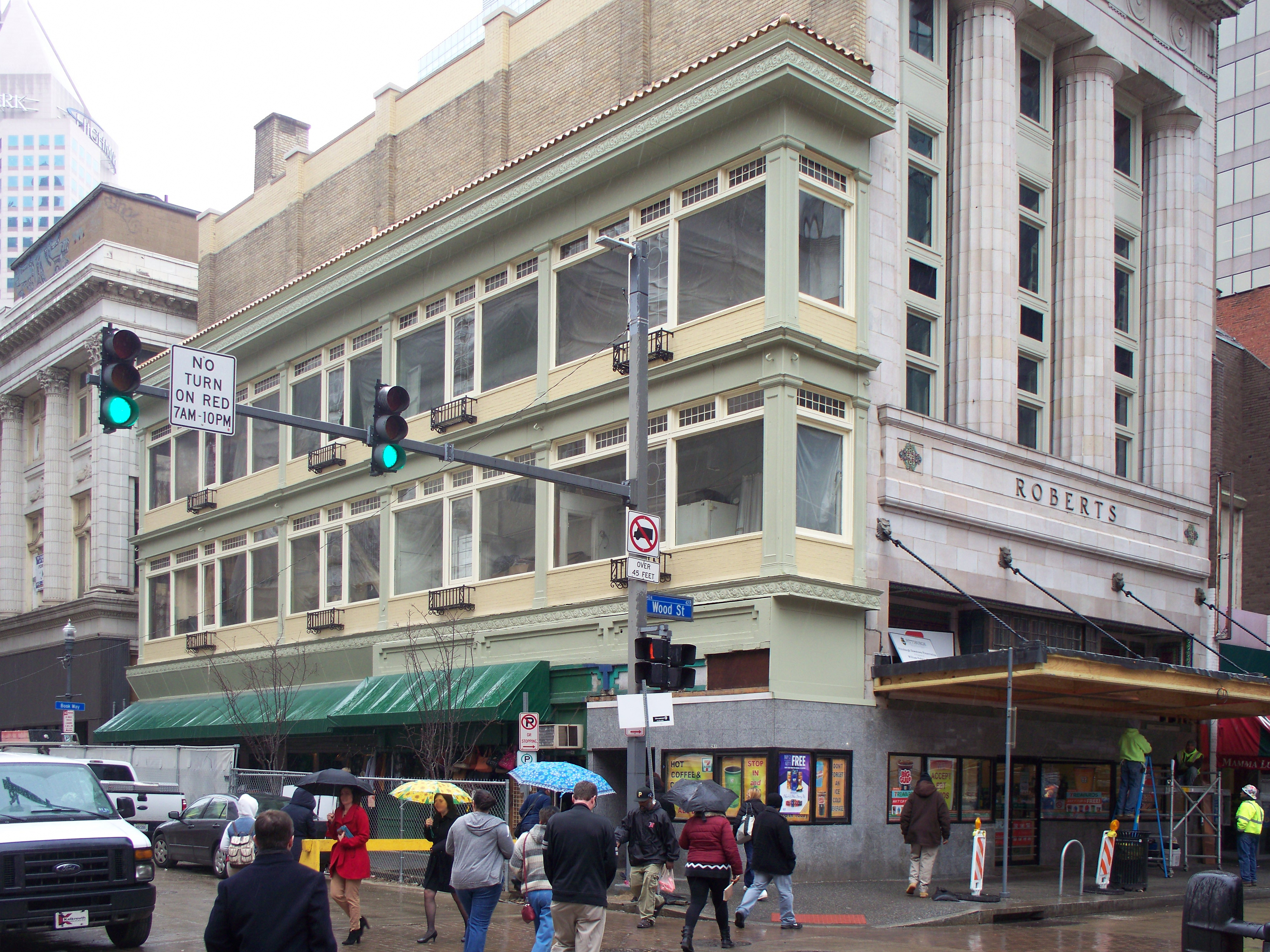
The Pittsburgh Skinny Building as in 2015

The Skinny Building is only 5 feet 2 inches (1.57 m) wide, rivaling the Sam Kee Building in Vancouver, which is considered the narrowest commercial building by Guinness World Records. Its narrow lot was created in 1903 by a street widening project, and the building itself was constructed in 1926 by Louis Hendel (c. 1874–1945), partly out of spite for neighboring business owners who complained about him obstructing the sidewalk with his fruit-selling business. The building is still standing, and is listed on the National Register of Historic Places as a contributing property in the Fourth Avenue Historic District.

=== Kavanagh Building, Buenos Aires ===
In 1934, Corina Kavanagh, of Irish descent, commissioned the building of a skyscraper in Buenos Aires, the Kavanagh Building, at the time the highest skyscraper in Latin America. Local legend holds that Kavanagh sought to arrange a marriage between one of her daughters and the son of the Anchorena family, one of the wealthiest and most traditional aristocratic families of the country; the Anchorenas, however, refused. Out of revenge, she had her high-rise building built between the Anchorena's palace and the church the family had erected on the opposing side of the adjoining square.

=== Virginia City Spite House, Virginia City, NV ===
In the 1950s, two Virginia City, Nevada, neighbors got into a dispute. When one of the men built a new house, the other bought the lot next to it and built a house less than 12 inches (30 cm) from his neighbor's house in spite to deprive the neighbor of both view and breeze. The Virginia City Spite House is still standing and occupied.

=== Al Ba'sa, Beirut ===
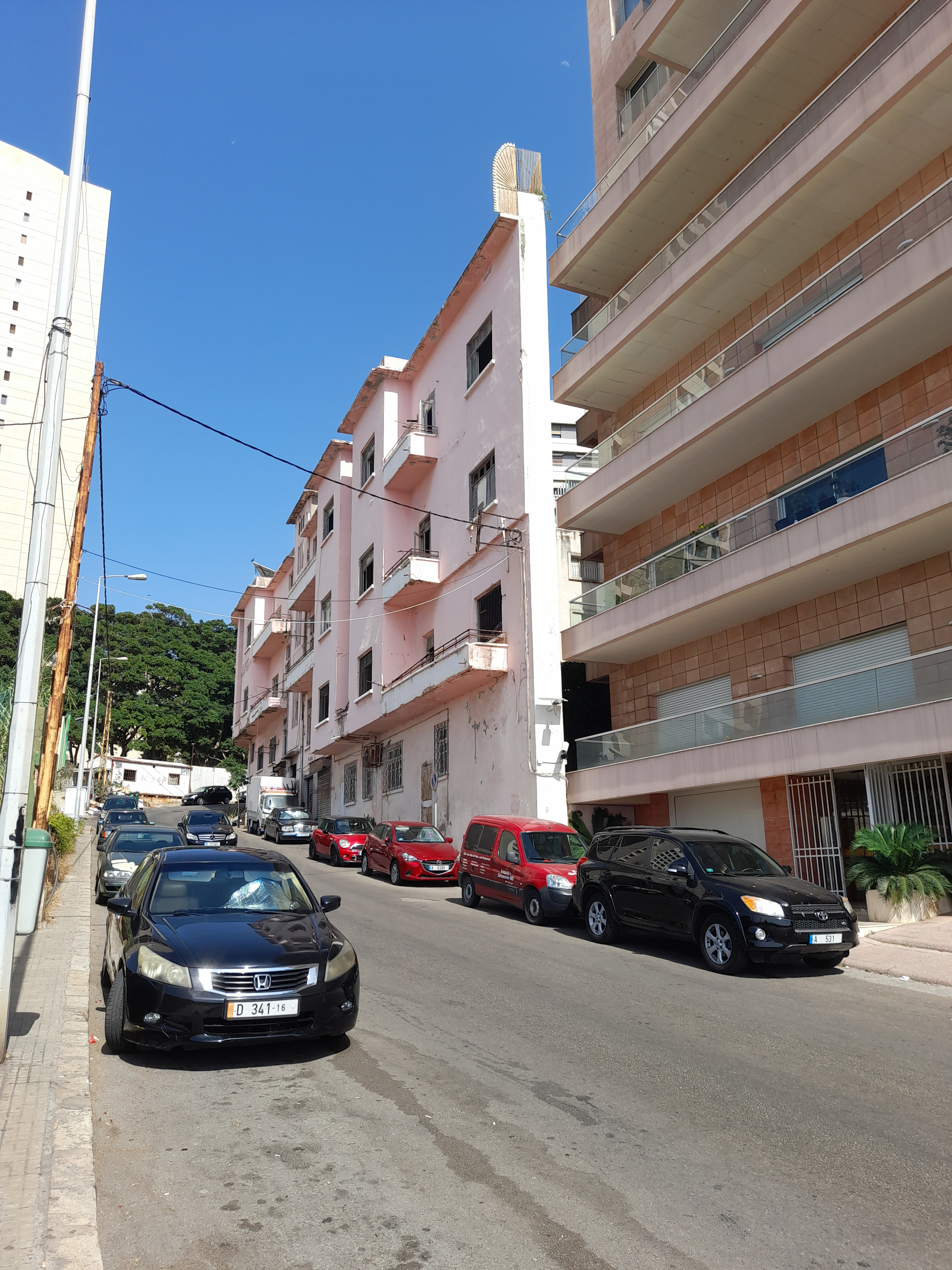
Al Ba'sa building in Beirut, Lebanon in 2024

In 1954, a thin wedge-shaped building was erected by architects Salah and Fawzi Itani on a 120 sq m plot in Beirut, Lebanon at the request of a man wanting to spoil the sea view of his brother after they failed to agree to jointly develop their neighboring plots. The street facade appears to be an ordinary apartment building, but is 60 cm at the narrowest and four meters at the widest. It is known as Al Ba'sa (The Middle Finger) and formerly as The Queen Mary for its resemblance to the ocean liner.

=== George Lucas' Grady Ranch, Marin County, CA ===
Film producer George Lucas wanted to construct a movie studio on land that he owned in Marin County, California, but, after years' opposition, abandoned the project in 2012. Instead, he decided to construct a low-income housing development. While some sources have speculated that the low-income housing proposal was to spite the high-income residents in the wealthy county, Lucas himself rejected that characterization.

=== Equality House, Topeka, KS ===
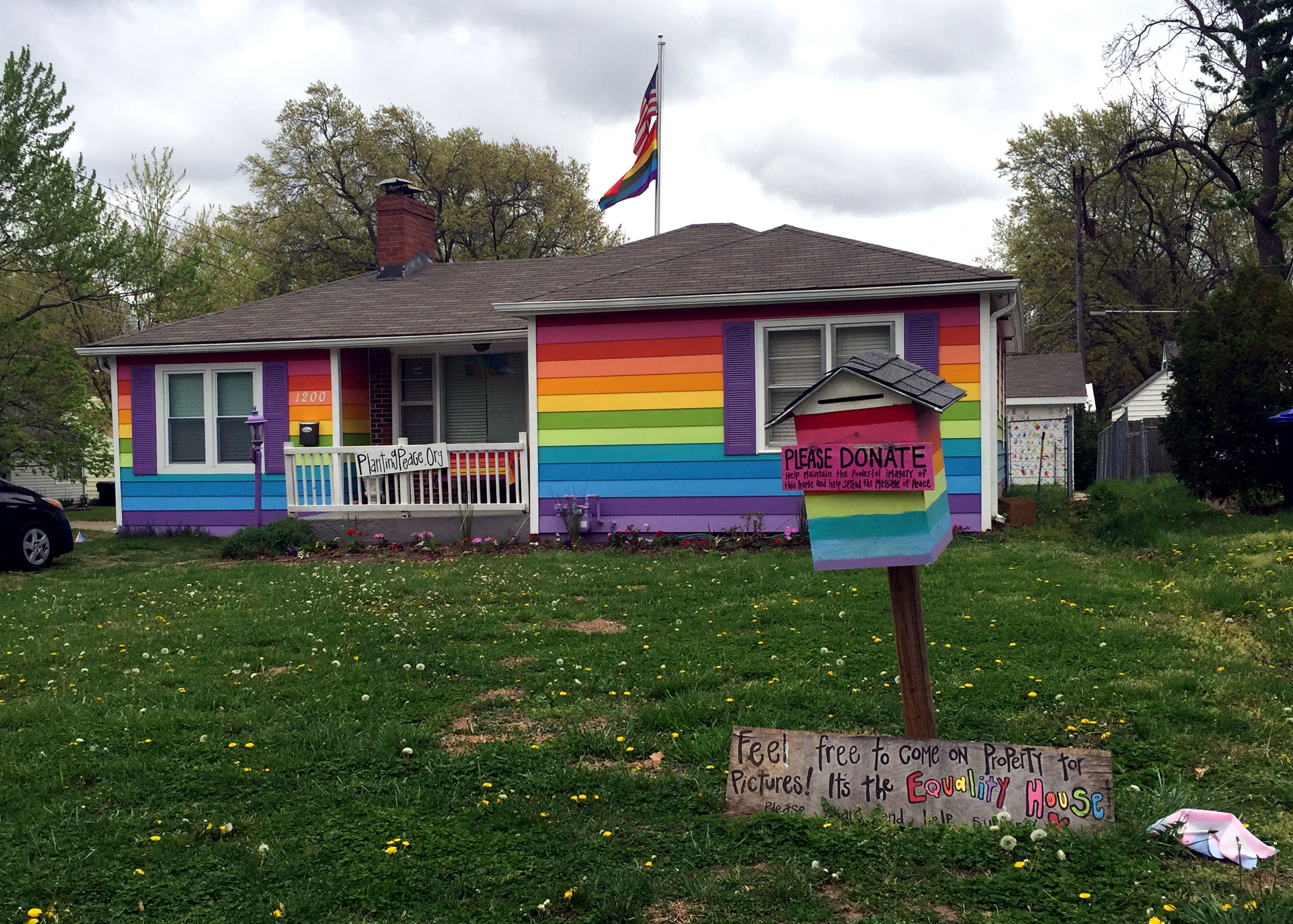
The Equality House in Topeka, Kansas in 2016

The Westboro Baptist Church of Topeka, Kansas, is infamous for its anti-LGBT picketing. The humanitarian charity Planting Peace purchased a house across the street from the church and, in 2013, had it painted to match the colors of the rainbow pride flag. It was named the 'Equality House' and has received worldwide attention and media coverage. In 2016, Planting Peace acquired the house next door to the Equality House and painted it the colors of the transgender pride flag. The houses provide shelter to volunteers and a community garden.

=== Victoria Hotel, Amsterdam ===
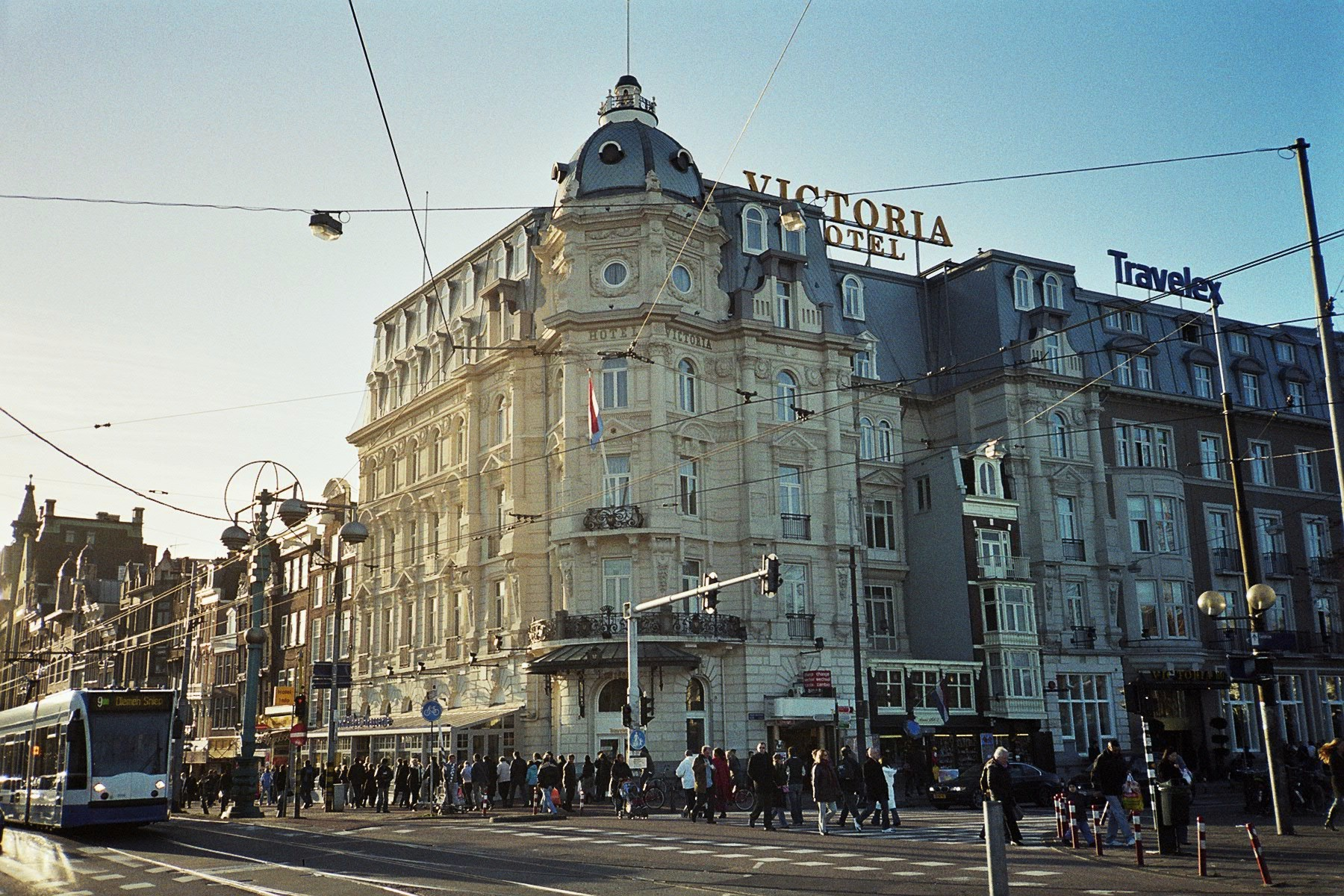
The Victoria Hotel in Amsterdam in 2007

The Victoria Hotel in Amsterdam, Netherlands, is designed around two older properties, whose owners refused to sell. Located at 45 - 47 Prins Hendrikkade, the hotel was unable to purchase the two buildings due to high prices. This was explored in the Dutch book and subsequent film Publieke werken (Public Works). The film is also known as A Noble Intention (2015).

=== Hess Triangle, New York City, NY ===
The Hess Triangle in New York City's West Village neighborhood is a 500-square-inch triangle with a message written on it that reads: "PROPERTY OF THE HESS ESTATE WHICH HAS NEVER BEEN DEDICATED FOR PUBLIC PURPOSES.” The triangle came about after land owned by the Hess family was seized in the early 1900s to build the subway.

=== Nail house, Jiangxi, China ===
The nail house in Jiangxi, China, received attention after viral videos were posted of the highway bypass surrounding it. In 2022, the owner refused a government offer to purchase the property. In response, the government built the highway bypass around the house, enclosing it on all sides.

== See also ==
- Air rights
- Cutting off one's nose to spite one's face
- Holdout (real estate)
- Nail house
- Smallest House in Great Britain
- Spite (sentiment)
- Spite fence
- Hess triangle
