= John Tytler (VC) =

Brigadier General John Adam Tytler VC
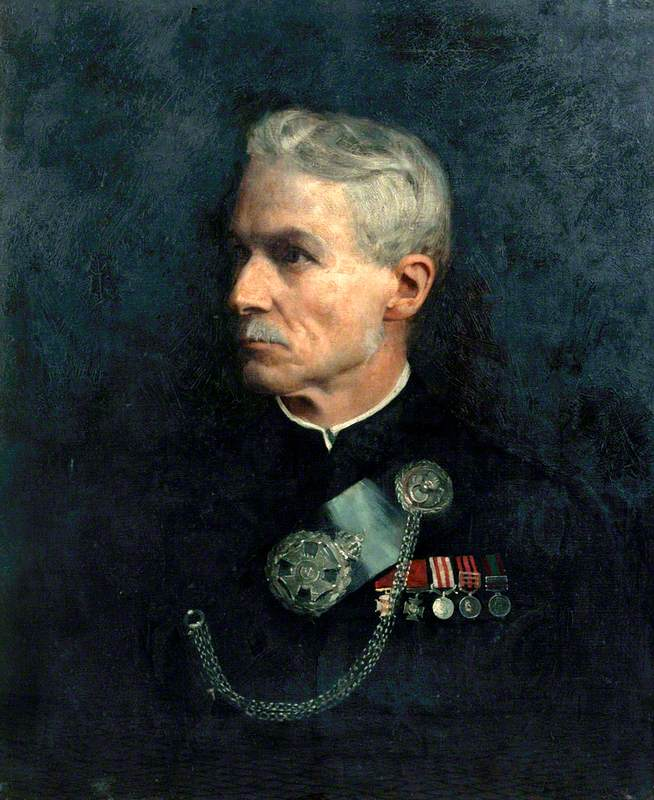
- Born: 29 October 1825; Monghyr, Bihar, British India
- Died: 14 February 1880 (aged 54); Thall, Kurram Valley, North West Frontier
- Burial place: Christian Cemetery, Kohat, Pakistan
- Military career
- Allegiance: United Kingdom
- Branch: Bengal Army; British Indian Army
- Rank: Brigadier General
- Units: 66th Bengal Native Infantry; Indian Staff Corps
- Conflicts: Indian Mutiny; Umbeyla Campaign
- Awards: Victoria Cross; Order of the Bath

Brigadier General John Adam Tytler (29 October 1825 – 14 February 1880) was a recipient of the Victoria Cross, the highest and most prestigious award for gallantry in the face of the enemy that can be awarded to British and Commonwealth forces.

== Biography ==
Tytler was born in Munger, the son of John Tytler, an East India Company surgeon. The family was related to Lord Gillies, cousin of Sir Alexander Burnes.

Tytler was 32 years old, and a lieutenant in the 66th Bengal Native Infantry, Bengal Army, and served initially under Sir Colin Campbell on the Peshawar frontier (1851–52) and Boori Pass (1853). He was later in the 1st Gurkha Rifles during the Indian Rebellion of 1857 when the following deed took place on 10 February 1858 at Choorpoorah, India for which he was awarded the VC:

On the attacking parties approaching the enemy's position under a heavy fire of round shot, grape, and musketry, on the occasion of the action at Choorpoorah, on the 10th February last, Lieutenant Tytler dashed on horseback ahead of all, and alone, up to the enemy's guns, where he remained engaged hand to hand, until they were carried by us; and where he was shot through the left arm, had a spear wound in his chest, and a ball through the right sleeve of his coat. (Letter from Captain C. C. G. Ross, Commanding 66th (Goorkha) Regiment, to Captain Brownlow, Major of Brigade, Kemaon Field Force.)

He later served in the Umbeyla Campaign and retired with the rank of brigadier general. He died of pneumonia following successful campaigns in the Second Anglo-Afghan War.

His Victoria Cross is displayed at The Gurkha Museum in Winchester, Hampshire, England.

== See also ==
- List of Brigade of Gurkhas recipients of the Victoria Cross
