= Henry William Tytler =

Scottish physician and translator

Henry William Tytler M.D. (c.1752–1808) was a Scottish physician and translator.

== Life ==
He was born at Fern, Forfarshire, the son of George Tytler (d. 1785), minister of there, and his wife, Janet Robertson; he was the younger brother of James Tytler. He was one of the early members of the Physical Society of Edinburgh.

First practising as a physician in Brechin, Tytler then went to abroad. He went around 1797 to Guernsey with his family; they then moved to the Cape of Good Hope, where Tytler had the post of Apothecary to the Forces, returning to the United Kingdom in 1802 when it became again part of the Dutch Cape Colony. After some months in London, they settled in Edinburgh. (Marshall states that Tytler went to India.)

Tytler wrote for the Gentleman's Magazine and other periodicals. The Scots Magazine in 1803 published a letter of his to the poet Eaglesfield Smith, critical of Samuel Taylor Coleridge and Robert Southey.

Tytler died at Edinburgh on 22 July 1808.

== Works ==
Tytler published:

- Works of Callimachus translated into English Verse; the Hymns and Epigrams from the Greek, with the Coma Berenices from the Latin of Catullus (1793), reputedly the first translation of a Greek poet by a native of Scotland. It was reprinted in Bohn's Classical Library (1856).
- Pædotrophia, or the Art of Nursing and Rearing Children: a Poem in three books, translated from the Latin of Scévole de Sainte-Marthe, with medical and historical notes.
- Voyage Home from the Cape of Good Hope (1804), with other related poems. A reviewer noted that the title poem was "narrated in easy, but not very elegant nor correct verse" and mentioned the author's friend John Penn of Stoke Park.

John Tytler, his son, published Tytler's Miscellanies in Verse (1828) in Calcutta. With it was published a translation of the Punica of Silius Italicus, in two volumes. Included were Tytler's comments on the earlier translation by Thomas Ross (died 1675).

== Family ==
Tytler married Christiana Gillies (died 1825), sister of John Gillies. Their children included: Robert Tytler, a surgeon in Bengal; John Tytler (1790–1837), born in Brechin, a medical man and orientalist, mathematics lecturer at the Hindu College from 1831 to 1835; and at least one daughter, Margaret.
