= John Tytler (surgeon) =

Scottish medical officer and orientalist

John Tytler (1787–1837) was a Scottish medical officer of the East India Company and orientalist. He was also a significant educator of Indian students in Calcutta.

== Early life ==
He was born in Brechin, the younger son of Henry William Tytler and his wife Christiana Gillies (died 1825), daughter of Robert Gillies of Little Keithock, and sister of John Gillies. When he was about seven, his father became an army surgeon, and the family moved to Guernsey. Shortly they went on to Cape Colony, where Henry William Tytler was Apothecary to the Forces. At age 12 John encountered and impressed John Barrow. In 1802 peace meant the territory reverted to its status as the Dutch Cape Colony, and the family returned to London.

In London only for some months, Tytler was a pupil at an academy in Soho Square run by the Rev. William Whitelock. The family then moved to Edinburgh, where he heard lectures by John Playfair. In line with his mother's wishes, aged 14 he took a place under her brother working in commerce, in London again. His father died in 1809, and around 1812 he pursued medical studies at St Bartholomew's Hospital, retaining his job. He qualified and was nominated as an East India Company assistant surgeon.

== In Bengal ==
Tytler sailed for India on HMS Carnatic in 1813, with his mother. There his sister Margaret (died 1822) joined the family household at Calcutta: she had been in Bengal for a year, with John's elder brother Robert, also a surgeon. It was Robert Tytler who engaged in an 1823 controversy as "Dr Tytler" with Ram Mohan Roy on christology.

After a short period at the Calcutta General Hospital, Tytler was posted in 1814 to Patna. While there he married, to a first cousin who came out to India in 1818. He was moved to Champaran in 1819, to the disappointment of William Jack who considered Tytler an "Ursa Major". Finding life there at Mallye unhealthy, he moved on to Munger, where his sister died. While in Patna, Margaret Tytler worked on local crafts, and Tytler presented a display of models to the Edinburgh Museum of Science and Art after her death.

In 1825 Tytler, after a promotion, was attached as surgeon to the 20th Regiment of Bengal Native Infantry, and in 1826 joined the unit at Barrackpore. He spent some time that year in Calcutta, and was elected to the Asiatic Society, before becoming garrison surgeon at Chunar. In 1827 he was made a presidency surgeon, meaning he resided permanently in Calcutta. He was shortly put in charge of the Education Committee press.

== Scholar ==
On his own account, Tytler began to learn Arabic in 1813, a task that took him 14 years. He also began to study and edit texts on Unani medicine. At Patna, through the senior magistrate Henry Douglas, he met Dewan Khan Ji (also Divan Kanhji), who had compiled a Persian work Khazanat ul Ilm covering European mathematics. Tytler did much to see it into print. At the end of his life, he also came into contact, via a Muslim scholar in the service of the son of Mitrajit Singh of the Tekari Raj, with another mathematical manuscript in Persian. It was named the Jamia Bahadur Khani.

In 1829, Tytler became joint curator of the museum of the Asiatic Society, with the naturalist David Ross. That year he gave a paper to the Asiatic Society on a "universal alphabet" for romanization of Asian languages. On the other hand, he opposed in 1833 Joseph Thomas Thompson's fully romanized Hindustani dictionary, when used by Indians.

== Educator ==
In the period to 1835, Tytler was involved in the nascent educational institutions in Calcutta: the Calcutta Madrasa now Aliah University, the Hindu College now Presidency College, Kolkata. At the Presidency College, Kolkata, he lectured on mathematics from 1831 to 1835. Among his mathematics pupils was Radhanath Sikdar.

At this time the clash between the "orientalist" and "Anglicist" approaches to the governing of British India came to a head. Tytler was known as a committed proponent of the "orientalist" attitude in medical education, and in 1827 he took over as Superintendent of the Native Medical Institution, from Peter Breton, who died in 1830. For the Madrasa, he and Breton provided translations of European medical texts into Arabic. He advocated also that students at the Hindoo College should be able to undertake medical education.

Administratively, the Bengal Presidency's educational policy was in the hands of the General Committee of Public Instruction (GCPI), set up in 1823. Up to 1833 the orientalists had a predominance there. The GCPI commissioned Tytler's translation of scientific and medical texts into Arabic and Persian. That attitude changed with the appointment to the GCPI of Charles Edward Trevelyan.

== The education debate and public policy ==
By 1834, the tide seemed to be turning against the orientalists, with Tytler writing to Horace Hayman Wilson that the government line appeared to be that Arabic, Persian and Sanskrit were not of practical use. In April of that year, Trevelyan leading the Anglicists on the GCPI proposed that the Calcutta Madrasa should only admit students who would study English as well as Arabic. He was opposed by Henry Thoby Prinsep at the head of the orientalists. Thomas Babington Macaulay, recently arrived in India, intervened with his Minute on Indian Education of February 1835, backed by Lord William Bentinck who was Governor-General of India, and the Madrasa's existence was under threat.

Tytler in January 1835 had a meeting with Macaulay to discuss the latter's Anglicist position, followed up by an exchange of letters, to no avail. Bentinck's objective was simpler and cheaper administration, that avoided the use of Persian, and on the advice of Samuel Ford Whittingham he had allowed Macaulay to take the public lead on the education issue.

The Native Medical Institution was closed down, as Tytler learned shortly before leaving on a planned journey to the Cape of Good Hope. On the GCPI, James Charles Colebrooke Sutherland, identified as "orientalist", had joined those condemning Tytler's teaching style, and H. T. Prinsep did not pursue an absolute line in favour of Arabic and Sanskrit; while Henry Shakespear had supported John Russell Colvin's view that English should be compulsory in the Madrasa. William Hay Macnaghten and James Prinsep resigned from the GCPI over Bentinck's stance. The medical classes at the Madrasa and Hindoo College were also stopped.

The replacement was the New Medical College. When Tytler applied to become its Superintendent, his view that English should not be the sole language of instruction made that impossible. The Calcutta Medical College, as it became known, did otherwise retain continuities with the old institution. Its first head was Mountford Joseph Bramley (1803–1837).

== Last years and aftermath ==
In 1835 Tytler took his family back to London. After a year they moved on again, to Jersey, where he died in 1837. A lengthy obituary notice appeared in the May 1837 issue of the Asiatic Journal; it was unsigned, but it is known that the author was Horace Hayman Wilson.

The education debate was brought to a compromise resolution by Lord Auckland, Governor-General of India in the later 1830s, in which translations of European science played a basic role.

== Works ==
- A short anatomical description of the heart, translated into Arabic (Calcutta, 1828)
- Hooper, Robert (1830). The Anatomist's Vade-mecum, by Dr. Robert Hooper, Translated Into Arabic by John Tytler. Education Press.
- Edition of the Arabic version by Hunayn ibn Ishaq of the Aphorisms of Hippocrates (Calcutta, 1832)
- Translation of the Book of Common Prayer into Arabic, with William Hodge Mill (1837)

== Family ==
Tytler married in 1818 Anne Gillies, daughter of William Gillies of London. Their children included:

- William Gillies Tytler (1821–1854), lawyer.
- John Adam Tytler VC (1825–1880), third son.
