= John Tyler (disambiguation) =

John Tyler (1790–1862) was the tenth president of the United States from 1841 to 1845.

John Tyler may also refer to:

- John Tyler Sr. (1747–1813), father of President Tyler and Governor of Virginia
- John Tyler Jr. (1819–1896), son of President Tyler and his first wife, Letitia Christian Tyler
- John Alexander Tyler (1848–1883), second son of President Tyler and his second wife, Julia Gardiner Tyler
- John Tyler (bishop) (1640–1724), Bishop of Llandaff
- John W. Tyler (1840–1913), British surgeon and superintendent of Agra jail
- John Poyntz Tyler (1862–1931), Episcopal bishop, nephew of President Tyler
- John Tyler (doctor) (1764–1841), American ophthalmologist

== See also ==
- John Tyler High School, a public co-educational secondary school in Tyler, Texas
- John Tyler Community College, renamed Brightpoint Community College in 2021
- Johnny Tyler (1918–1961), American singer
- Johnnie Tyler (1906–1972), American baseball player
- Tyler Prize for Environmental Achievement, established by John and Alice Tyler in 1973
