= John Tyler (doctor) =

American politician

- Born: June 29, 1763; Prince George's County, Maryland
- Died: October 15, 1841 (aged 78); Frederick, Maryland

John Tyler (29 June 1763 – 15 October 1841) was an American ophthalmologist. He is believed to be one of the first doctors in the United States to perform cataract surgery.

== Early life ==
John Tyler was born in Prince George's County, Maryland, on 29 June 1763 to Samuel and Susanna (DuVal) Tyler.

== Career ==
He began his study of medicine under Dr. Smith of Georgetown, later becoming a student at St. Bartholomew's Hospital, from which he received his diploma. While in London, he studied under John Abernethy. He began practicing in Frederick, Maryland, in 1786. He was one of the first oculists in the United States, as well as one of the earliest doctors to perform cataract surgery. Couching had been performed in the United States since the 1760s, and Tyler was regionally well known for his skill at that procedure.

He was a founding member of the Medical and Chirurgical Faculty of the State of Maryland, and was also a member of the masonic lodge of Frederick.

He was an officer during the Whiskey Rebellion. He served as a Maryland state senator for Frederick County in 1804, and was an elector of Thomas Jefferson.

== Spite house ==
Tyler is also known for the spite house he built in Frederick on West Church Street, next door to his own house, to prevent the extension of Record Street. Construction is said to have started the night before a city meeting to condemn the land, owned by Tyler, through which the proposed extension would run. The house is on the National Register of Historic Places.

== Later life ==
At some point in his life, Tyler owned a greyhound named Guess, who is immortalized in a cast-iron statue in front of his home on W. Church Street. He retired from his medical practice as he began to lose his hearing. He died in Frederick on 15 October 1841.
