= Hess triangle =

Small tiled plot of land in New York City

- Private land
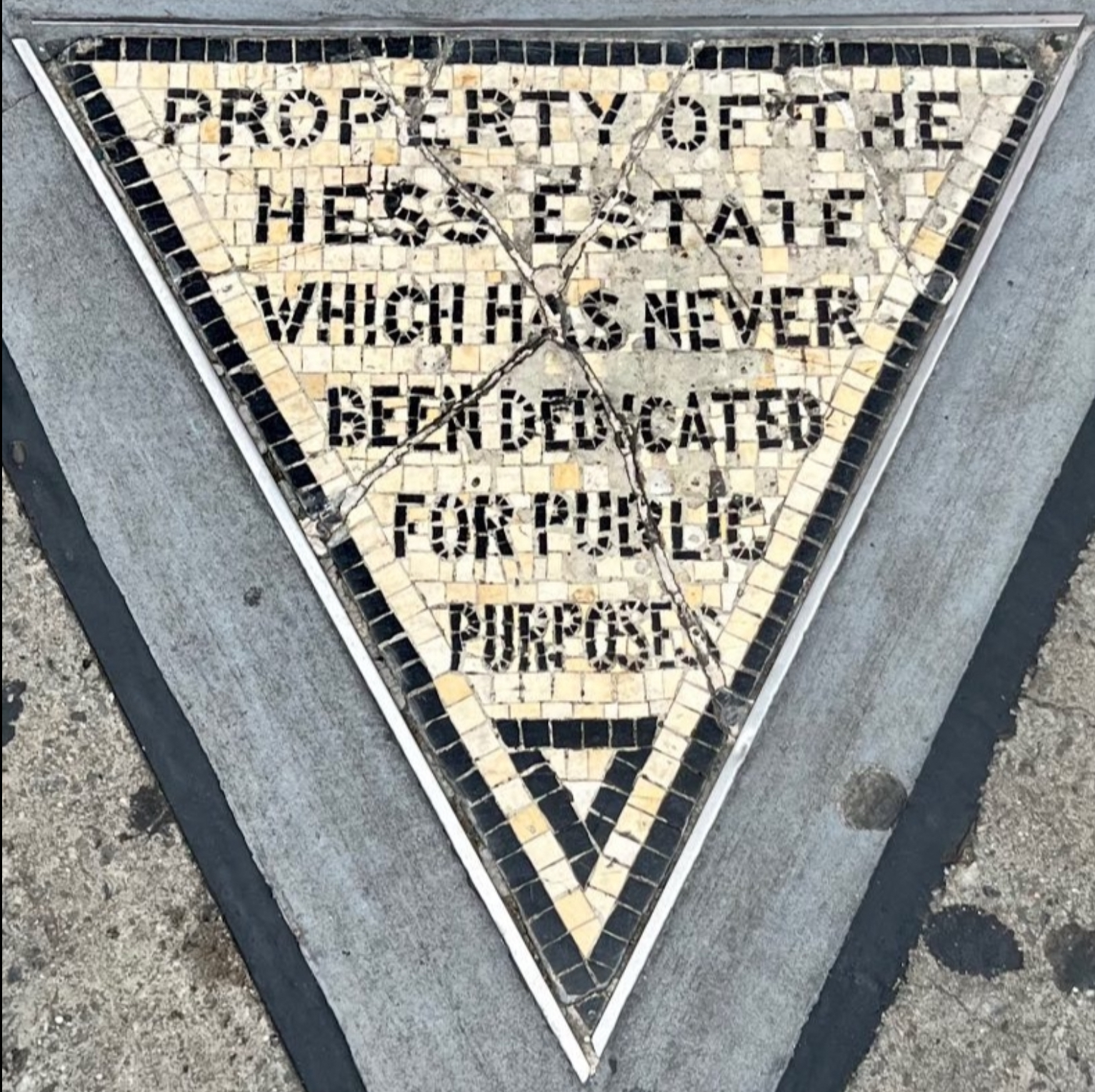
- Mosaic detail of the Hess triangle
- Features: Plaque
- Dimensions: 25 by 27 inches (64 cm × 69 cm) (Note: Sources disagree on the triangle's dimensions. WABC-TV cites the triangle as measuring 24.5 inches (620 mm) along its base and 26.5 inches (670 mm) along its sides. The Village Voice cites the triangle as measuring 25.5 inches (650 mm) along its base and 27.5 inches (700 mm) along its sides.)
- Area: 500 square inches (0.32 m^{2})
- Dedicated to: Hess estate
- Address: 110 7th Ave S
- Interactive map of Hess triangle
- Coordinates: 40.733513°N 74.003067°W

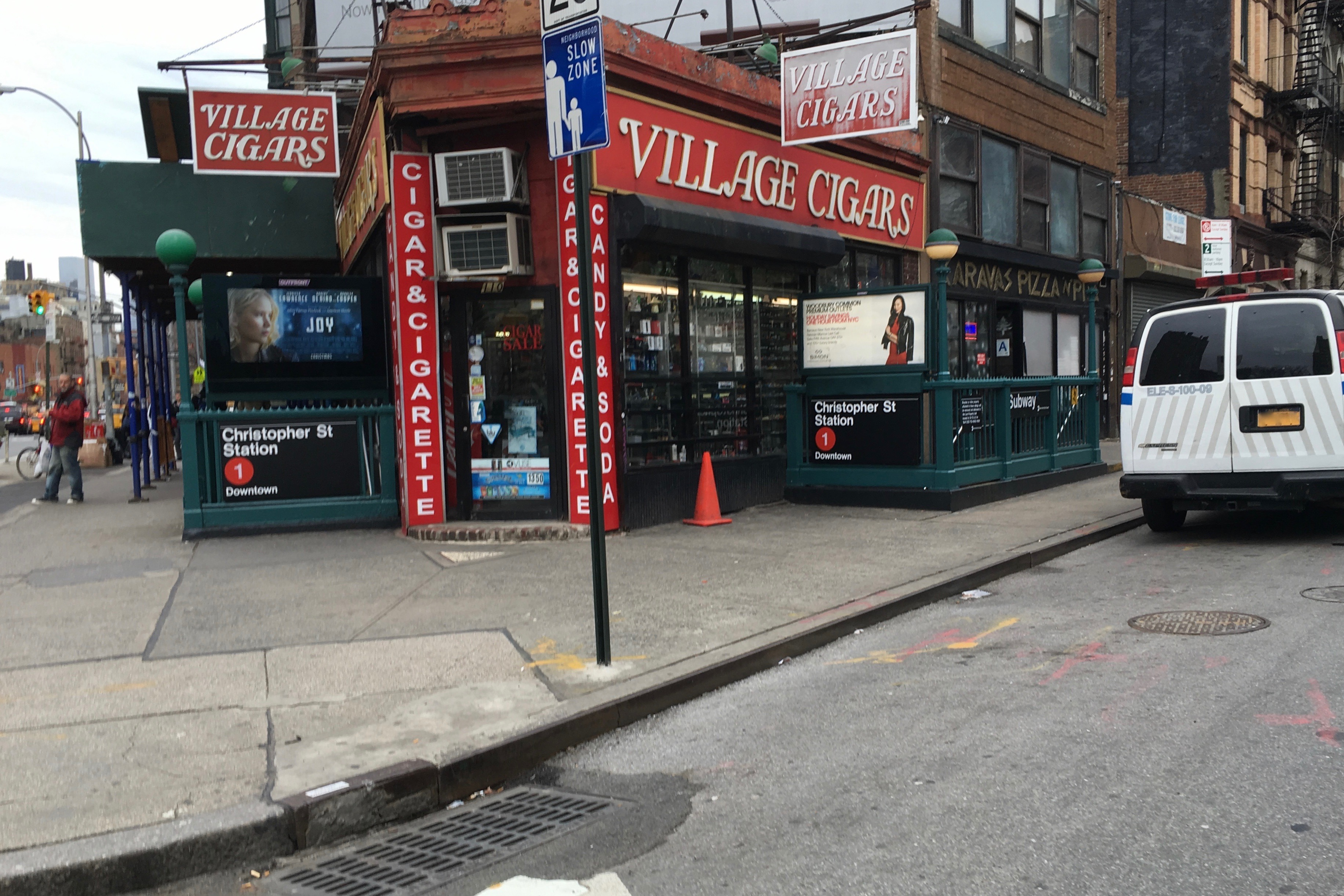
Location of the triangle in 2015, outside the Village Cigars shop and the Christopher Street–Stonewall station of the New York City Subway. The triangle can be seen on the sidewalk toward the left side of the photo.

The Hess triangle is a triangular, 500-square-inch (0.32 m^{2}) plot of private land surrounded by a public sidewalk at the corner of Seventh Avenue South and Christopher Street in the West Village neighborhood of Manhattan in New York City. The plot is an isosceles triangle covered by a mosaic plaque that reads:

PROPERTY OF THE HESS ESTATE WHICH HAS NEVER BEEN DEDICATED FOR PUBLIC PURPOSES

The Hess triangle is the result of a dispute between the city government and the estate of David Hess, a landlord from Philadelphia who owned the Voorhis, a five-story apartment building. In the early 1910s, the city claimed eminent domain to acquire and demolish 253 buildings in the area in order to widen Seventh Avenue and expand the IRT subway. By 1913, the Hess family had exhausted all legal options. However, according to Ross Duff Wyttock writing in the Hartford Courant in 1928, Hess's heirs identified that a small corner of Plot 55 had been excluded during the city’s seizure of the Voorhis property and subsequently filed a notice of possession. The city asked the family to donate the diminutive property to the public, but they chose to hold out and installed the present, defiant mosaic on July 27, 1922.

In 1938, the property, reported to be the smallest plot in New York City, was sold to the adjacent Village Cigars store (United Cigars at that time) for US$100 (equivalent to $2,287 in 2025). Later, Yeshiva University came to own the property, including the Hess triangle, and in October 1995, it was sold by Yeshiva to 70 Christopher Realty Corporation. Subsequent owners have left the plaque intact.

The triangle and Village Cigars shop behind it were briefly listed for sale in 2021. No sale took place, and Village Cigars closed in 2024, ending 102 years of use as a cigar shop. A Georgian restaurant called Mamali replaced the cigar shop but kept its distinctive red-and-white signs.
