= Skinny House =

Skinny House may refer to:

- Skinny House (Boston), Massachusetts, US
- Skinny House (Deerfield), Illinois, US
- Skinny House (Long Beach), California, US
- Skinny House (Mamaroneck, New York), US

== See also ==
- Skinny Building
- Spite house
- 75½ Bedford St, New York City
- Pie house
- Smallest house in Amsterdam
- Smallest House in Great Britain
- Casa Scaccabarozzi
