= 75½ Bedford Street =

Building in Manhattan, New York

Coordinates: 40.73137°N 74.00503°W

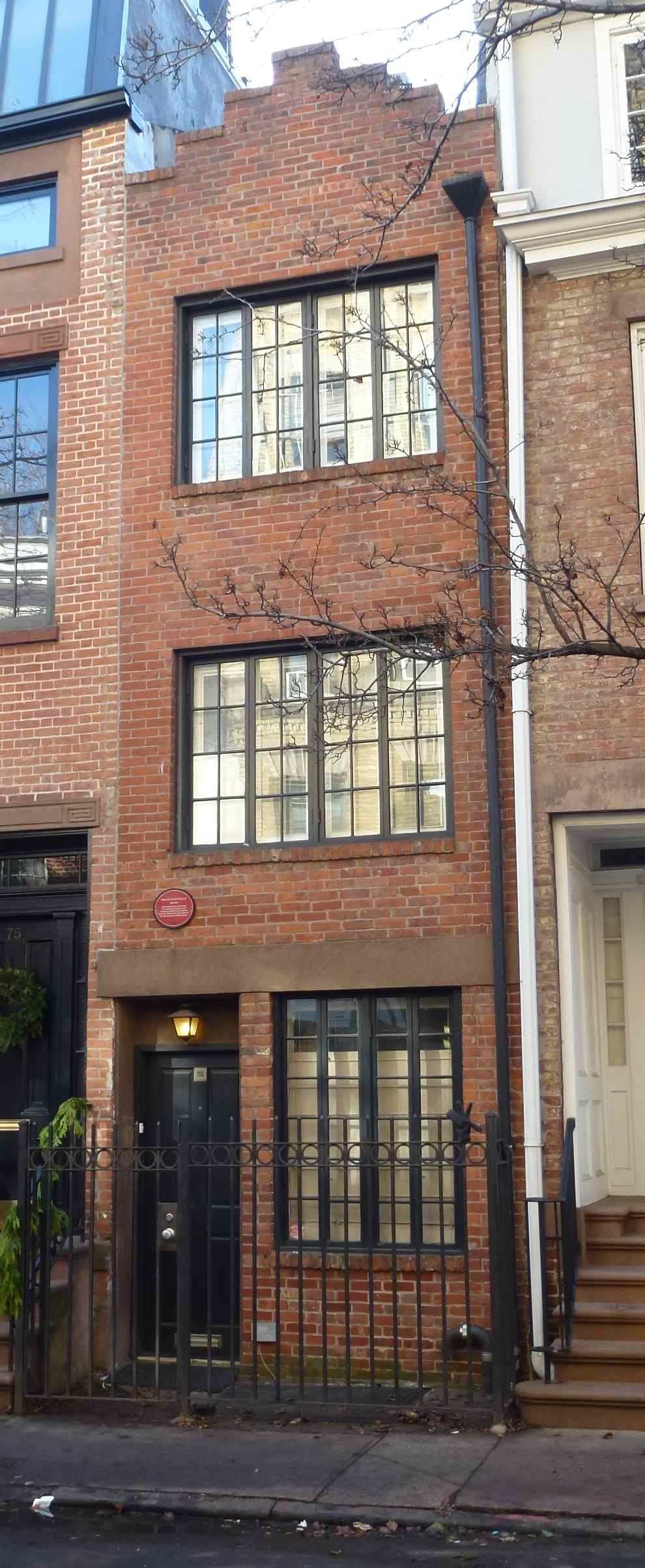
Millay House, 75½ Bedford Street

75½ Bedford Street is a house located in the West Village neighborhood of New York City that is only 9 feet 6 inches (2.9 meters) wide. Built in 1873, it is often described as the narrowest house in New York. Its past tenants have included Edna St. Vincent Millay, author Ann McGovern, cartoonist William Steig and anthropologist Margaret Mead. It is sometimes referred to as the Millay House, indicated by a plaque on the outside of the house. The house is located in the Greenwich Village Historic District, but is not an individually designated New York City Landmark.

== History ==
The three-story house is located at 75½ Bedford Street, between Commerce and Morton Streets, not far from Seventh Avenue South in the West Village section of Manhattan. The New York City Landmarks Preservation Commission considers it the city's narrowest townhouse. On the inside, the house measures 8 feet 7 inches (2.62 m) wide; at its narrowest, it is only 2 feet (0.61 m) wide.

According to the Landmarks Preservation Commission and the archives of the Greenwich Village Society for Historic Preservation, the house was constructed in 1873 during a smallpox epidemic, for Horatio Gomez, trustee of the Hettie Hendricks-Gomez Estate, on what was the former carriage entranceway for the adjacent property, which includes the adjacent 1799 house at 77 Bedford Street, built by Joshua Isaacs, the oldest house in Greenwich Village. However, the house may have been constructed earlier, as the style that appears in a 1922 photograph at the New-York Historical Society is typical of the 1850s Italianate architecture common in the area at the time.

In 1923, the house was leased by a consortium of artists who used it for actors working at the nearby Cherry Lane Theater. Cary Grant and John Barrymore stayed at the house while performing at the Cherry Lane during this time. Edna St. Vincent Millay, the Pulitzer Prize winning poet, and her new husband, coffee importer Eugen Jan Boissevain, lived in the house from 1923 to 1924. They hired Ferdinand Savignano to renovate the house. He added a skylight, transformed the top floor into a studio for Millay and added a Dutch-inspired front gabled façade for her husband.

Later occupants included cartoonist William Steig and his sister-in-law, anthropologist Margaret Mead. The house was the inspiration the children's book Mr Skinner's Skinny House, written by former resident Ann McGovern and illustrated by Mort Gerberg. George Gund IV, son of sports entrepreneur George Gund III, purchased the house for $3.25 million in June 2013.

== Architecture ==
The external dimensions of the house are approximately 9.5 by 42 feet (2.9 by 12.8 m), on a lot that is 80 feet (24 m) deep, while the internal dimensions vary between 2 and 8.5 feet (0.61 and 2.59 m) by 30 feet (9.1 m) deep. City records list the house as 999 square feet (92.8 m^{2}).

The exterior features a stepped gable similar to those seen in the Dutch architectural tradition. Inside, "[a] centrally placed spiral staircase dominates all three floors and bisects the space into two distinct living areas. The narrow steps call for expert sideways navigational skills. Under the stairwell on the first floor is a tiny utility closet, the only closed storage space in the house. All three floors have fireplaces". An arched doorway leads to the shared garden in the rear. The house has two bathrooms, and its galley kitchen comes with a microwave built into the base of the winding staircase that rises to the upper floors.

== Other narrow houses in New York City ==
Although popularly known as the narrowest house in New York, according to The Wall Street Journal "... a search of [New York] city tax records suggests that several residential buildings may be smaller. The tax files list a 9-foot-wide house that shares a lot with a larger house on East 27th Street in Manhattan, and a corner building in Greenpoint in Brooklyn with an office on the ground floor listed at just under 8 feet".

== See also ==
- Skinny House (Deerfield)
- Skinny House (Boston)
- Skinny House (Long Beach)
- Skinny House (Mamaroneck, New York)
- The Smallest House in Amsterdam
- Smallest House in Great Britain
