= Skinny House (Mamaroneck, New York) =

Historic house in New York, United States

- U.S. National Register of Historic Places
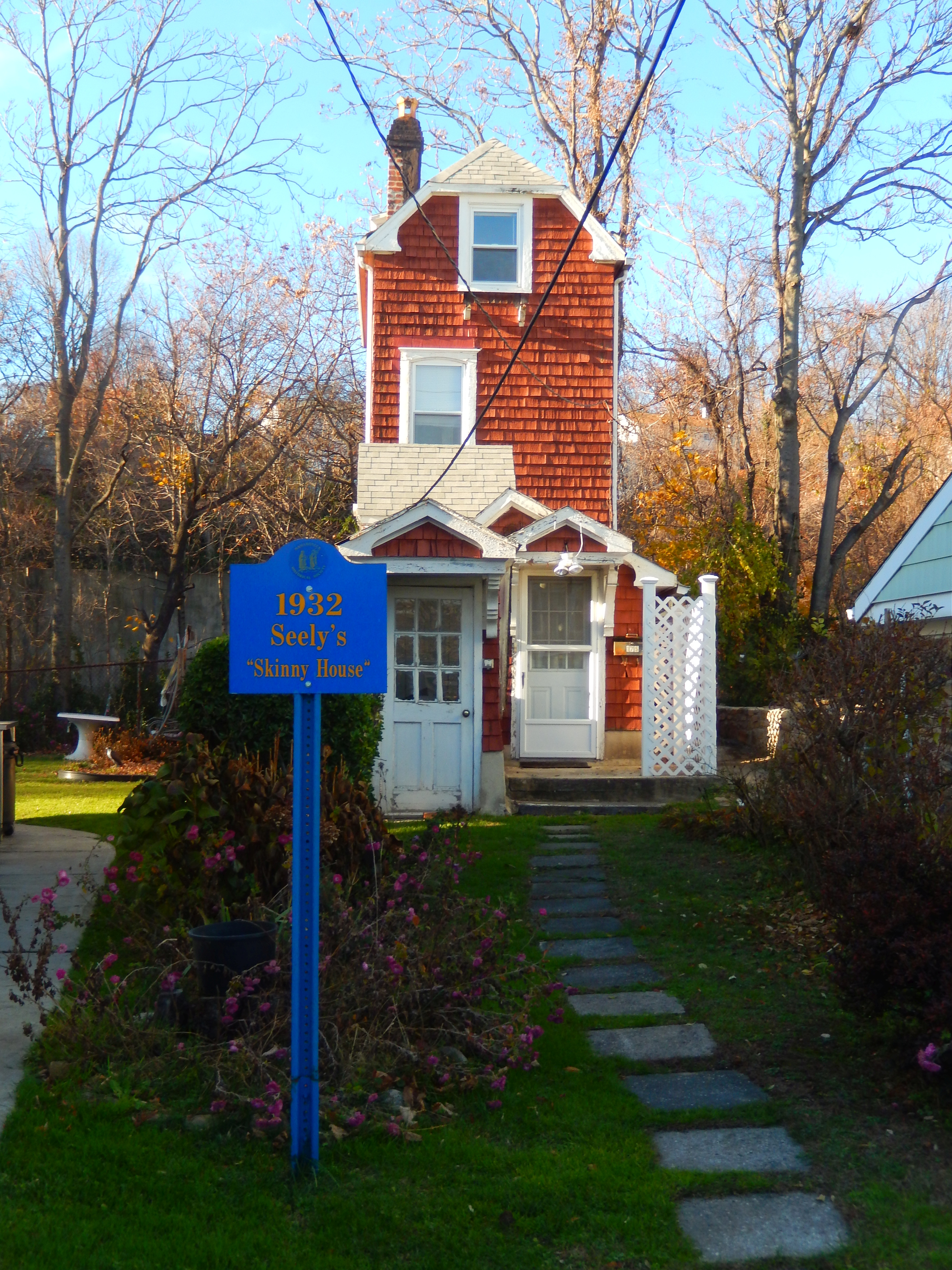
- Seely Skinny House (Mamaroneck, New York), built in 1932 by Nathan T. Seely. It is 10 feet wide and is listed on the National Register of Historic Places

- Location within New York Location within the United States
- Location: 175 Grand Street, Mamaroneck, New York
- Coordinates: 40°57′17″N 73°44′33″W
- Area: 0.03 acres (0.012 ha)
- Built: 1932
- Built by: Nathan Thomas Seely
- NRHP reference No.: 15000235
- Added to NRHP: May 18, 2015

The Skinny House in Mamaroneck, New York, was built in 1932 by African-American carpenter and building contractor Nathan Thomas Seely on an extremely narrow lot of donated land after he lost his home to foreclosure and his company to bankruptcy during the early years of the Great Depression. The 10 feet (3.0 m) wide house has 3 stories and was built on a 12.5 feet (3.8 m) wide plot of land sold to him by his neighbor, to whom he had earlier sold a larger plot of land. The house was constructed entirely from salvaged materials. The New York State Board for Historic Preservation noted “its efficient and beautiful design, careful engineering, and effective interior plan. Challenged by a narrow lot and minimal financial means, Seely created a house that demonstrated both his ingenuity and the desire to provide, above all else, housing for his family.” The Westchester County Historical Society said “its professional construction and ingenious design are a testimony to the dedication of a prominent black contractor to build a solid, functional, and delightful home. It represents both black enterprise and good neighborliness, and is architecturally significant as a symbol of American ingenuity and craftsmanship.”

== History ==
During the mid-1910s, Nathan and Lillian Seely moved to the Washingtonville neighborhood of Mamaroneck, New York. The neighborhood was home to a community of first-generation immigrants predominantly Italian, and African-American families who moved to Westchester County as a result of the Great Migration.

In 1925 Nathan Seely and his brother Willard founded Seely Brothers Inc., a construction company that aimed to build for African-American clients. Seely hired Italian masons from the Washingtonville neighborhood, as well as African-American laborers for the company's projects. Seely Brothers purchased 11 lots within the Washingtonville neighborhood and built several homes, including Nathan Seely's own house, a seven-room house that he had designed and built in 1926 on Grand Street for his own family. The house “showcased many amenities considered very modern at the time,” according to the submission to the National Park Service, which oversees the National Register of Historic Places.

During the Great Depression Seely lost both his house and his company. In 1931, his neighbor Panfilo Santangelo, an Italian immigrant and stonemason, gave Nathan a twelve-and-a-half-foot strip of land between the Santangelo home and the former Seely home for Seely to build upon. The land that Santangelo's house sat upon had been previously purchased by him from Seely and ran between the two men's houses, including the property Mr. Seely lost when the Depression began.

Mr. Seely died in 1962. Family members lived in the house until 1986, and it was bought by the daughter of the man who originally gave the land to Seely, Ida Santangelo, in 1988.

== Construction ==
With little money to purchase new building materials, Mr. Seely salvaged and recycled building materials including railroad ties, windows, banisters and even a chicken coop to incorporate into his house. Seely designed and constructed his family's new home maximizing its utility by building a basement, two stories, and an attic. He also devised numerous built-ins and windows for natural lighting to give the impression of more interior space. He built the three ornate gables in the front facing facade, and added a ledge for flowerpots just under the second-level window

The 10 feet (3.0 m) wide by 39 feet (12 m) long, 27 feet (8.2 m) tall, hip roofed, wood shingled home is set on a 12.5 feet (3.8 m) by 100 feet (30 m) property. The house is positioned approximately 20 feet (6.1 m) back from the modern set back line on which the surrounding homes are built in order to maximize light exposure, and it is visible from the New England Thruway, Interstate 95. The Skinny House is sheathed in red brown wood shingles unifying the facades that are punctuated with a variety of windows and doors, which are trimmed in white painted wood. The main hip roof, first floor gable roof with a modified dormer, and entry gable roofs are of asphalt shingles. There are cables on the sides of the home to anchor it to the ground. Two railroad ties serving as beams run through the cellar. The sewer pipe is supported by finished marble. The house was heated with coal stoves on each floor. Floor grates allow heat to rise to the bedrooms. In the cellar there remains one original pot-bellied stove, coal chute and pails. One brick chimney on the west side of the house supports all of the stoves. The interior is finely finished with plaster and hardwood floors and moldings and woodwork throughout.

The Grand Street home is one of a number of renowned “skinny houses” in the United States, including ones in Long Beach, California, Boston, Massachusetts and Deerfield, Illinois. In Amsterdam, the Netherlands, the "Smallest House in Amsterdam" at 22 Oude Hoogstraat is purported to be the narrowest house in Europe. That was constructed in 1733 and stands just 2.02 meters (6 feet 8 inches) wide. A living structure called Keret House in Warsaw, Poland built by architect Jakub Szczęsny in 2012 may be the world's narrowest house at only 133 centimeters (4.36 feet) at its widest point however it is too narrow to be considered a residence under Polish law so it is considered to be an art installation.

== Landmark status ==
The house was designated by the local county historical society as a landmark in 1991 and was placed on the National Register of Historic Places in 2015. The Skinny House is privately owned and is not open to the public.

== In popular culture ==
Seely's great-granddaughter, Dr. Julie Seely, wrote a screenplay titled “Skinny House” in 2011.

== See also ==
- National Register of Historic Places listings in southern Westchester County, New York
