= Shem Drowne =

American coppersmith (1683–1774)

- Born: December 4, 1683; Sturgeon Creek, Eliot, York County, Massachusetts Bay Colony
- Died: January 13, 1774 (aged 90); Boston, Province of Massachusetts Bay
- Body discovered: Copp's Hill Burying Ground, North End of Boston, Massachusetts
- Occupation: Coppersmith
- Spouse: Katherine Clark (m. 1712)
- Children: 10
- Parents: Leonard Drowne (father); Elizabeth Abbott (mother)

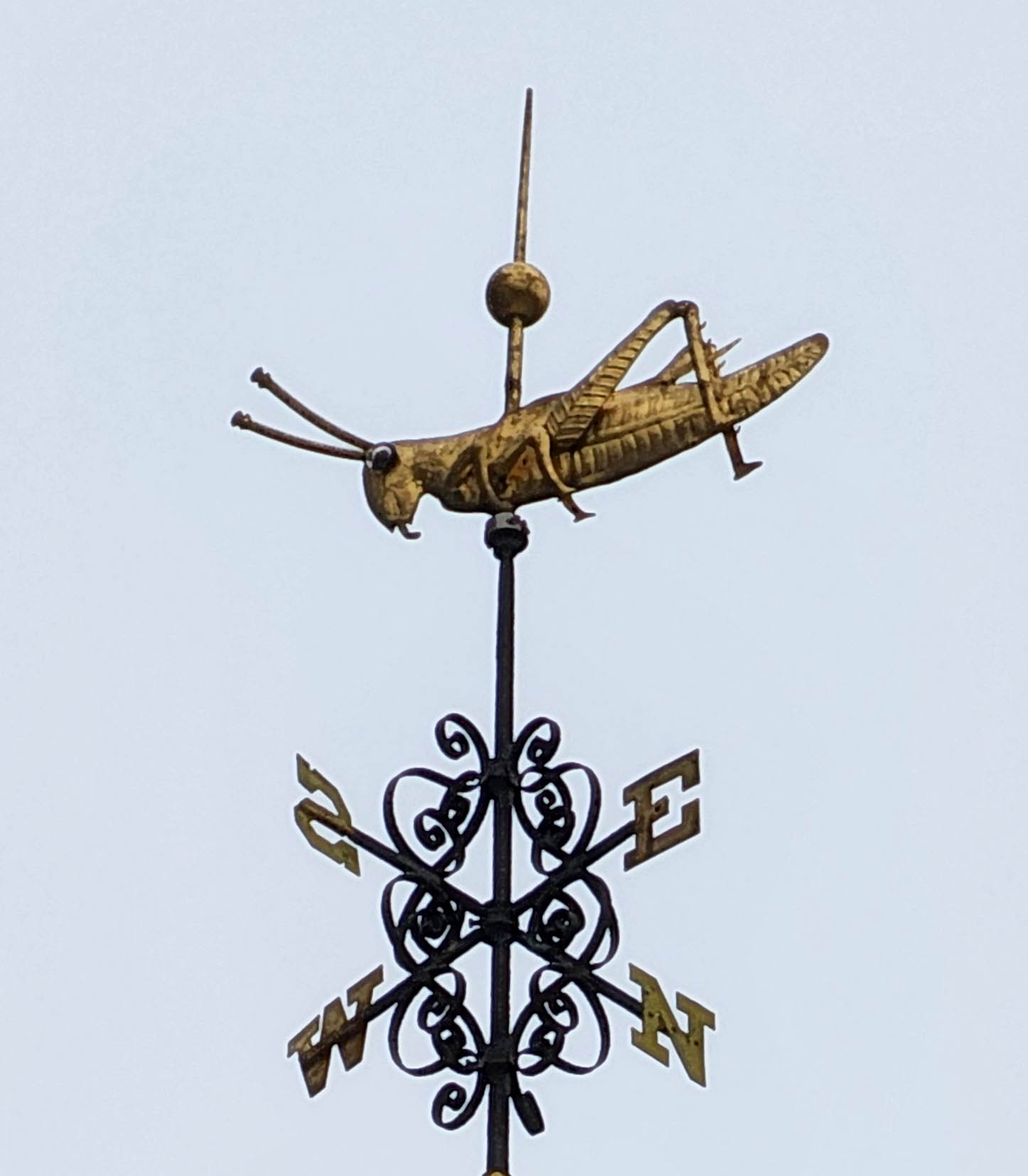
Faneuil Hall weathervane

Shem Drowne (December 4, 1683 – January 13, 1774) was a colonial coppersmith and tinplate worker in Boston, Massachusetts, and was America's first documented weathervane maker. He is most famous for the grasshopper weathervane atop of Faneuil Hall, well known as a symbol of Boston. He was also a deacon of the First Baptist Church of Boston.

== Early life ==
Drowne was born near Sturgeon Creek in what is now the town of Eliot, York County, Maine. He was the third son of Leonard Drowne and Elizabeth (ne Abbott). Leonard was a shipbuilder who came from Penryn, Cornwall, to what was then part of Kittery in the Massachusetts Bay Colony. Leonard helped organize and build the first Baptist Church in Maine in 1682. During King William's War many Maine towns were raided and English settlements were massacred by the Wabanaki Indians in conjunction with the French. In 1696, 28 members of the Baptist Church moved to Charleston, South Carolina, and established the first Baptist church there. The Drownes moved to Boston, Massachusetts, in 1699 due to the ongoing war and violence.

== Career ==
Shem was a coppersmith with a shop on Ann Street (now North Street) in the North End.

According to the colonial diarist Thomas Newell, Shem Drowne "was the first tin plate worker that ever came to Boston, New England." He worked as a tin plate worker and a coppersmith. He is on lists of colonial silversmiths as a result of a silver beaker marked "SD," tentatively attributed to him. However, antiquarian Francis Hill Bigelow wrote "the attribution to Shem Drowne of Boston is probably erroneous. There seems to be no evidence that Drowne was a silversmith". This corresponds with Suffolk County deeds which lists Drowne's occupation as tinplate worker. Drowne's nephew, his sister-in-law's child Timothy Parrott, was a Boston silversmith. His grand-nephews, Samuel Drowne and Benjamin Drown, and Samuel's sons, Thomas Pickering Drown and Daniel P. Drown, were all notable practicing silversmiths from Portsmouth, New Hampshire.

In 1716, he created America's first authenticated weathervane, a gilded American Indian archer, for the cupola of Providence House in Boston, which in 1716 became the official residence of the royal governor. In 1721 he created a rooster weathervane (also known as the weathercock) for the New Brick Church on Hanover St, the vane is now on First Church in Cambridge, Massachusetts. In 1740 he made the 6-foot-long (1.8 m) copper swallow-tailed banner weathervane that is now atop Old North Church in Boston.

=== The Grasshopper Weathervane ===
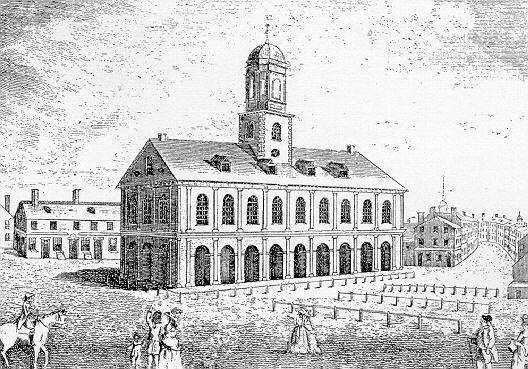
Faneuil Hall in 1740

His most famous work is the weathervane on top of Faneuil Hall. Commissioned by Peter Faneuil in 1742, it was designed to complement the grasshopper weathervane atop the Royal Exchange in the City of London, and help symbolize the new building as the capital of finance in the New World. The grasshopper is copper gilded with gold leaf with glass eyes. The vane fell off the building during the earthquake of 1755 which shook Boston. He and his son Thomas repaired it and remounted it.

In 1768 Thomas placed a note labeled "food for the grasshopper" in the belly of the grasshopper. It read:

Shem Drowne made it, May 25, 1742. To my brethren and fellow grasshoppers, Fell in ye year 1753 (1755) Nov. 13, early in ye morning by a great earthquake by my old Master above. Again, like to have met with Utter Ruin by Fire, by hopping Timely from my Public Station, came of the broken bones and much Bruised. Cured and Fixed. Old Master's son Thomas Drowne June 28, 1768, and Though I will promise to Discharge my office, yet I shall vary as ye wind.

The weathervane is the only part of Faneuil Hall which remains totally unmodified from the original 1742 structure. In 1805, Charles Bulfinch expanded the building and moved the cupola from the middle of the building to the front. In 1974 the vane was stolen but recovered in less than a week.

=== Drowne's Wooden Image ===
Nathaniel Hawthorne credited Shem Drowne for being the inspiration for his retelling of Pygmalion (mythology), Drowne's Wooden Image, in his collection of shorts in Mosses from an Old Manse. His short story, first published in 1844, recasts "Deacon Drowne" as a woodcarver who made trade signs and wooden figures for various shops and a notable statue of Admiral Edward Vernon in Boston. In the story "Deacon Drowne" is approached by a ship-captain to produce a figurehead for his brig, claiming "nothing like the brig ever swam the ocean, so I am determined she shall have such a figurehead as old Neptune never saw in his life" and giving secret instructions for its completion. During the story, Drowne is visited by contemporary Bostonian artist John Singleton Copley who is impressed by his craftsmanship and inquires about his unfinished work and returns daily to check on the progress of the figurehead. There is no evidence that the real Shem Drowne did any carving, but the story clearly references him as the creator of the American Indian Archer weathervane.

== The Drowne claim to the Pemaquid Patent ==
In 1631, the Plymouth Council for New England granted two merchants from Bristol, England, Robert Aldsworth and Gyles Elbridge, 12,000 acres (49 km^{2}) near what would become Bristol, Maine in a document known as the Pemaquid Patent. Gyles survived Aldworth and passed it to his son John, who in turn passed it to his brother Thomas. In 1650, Thomas Elbridge mortgaged Monhegan Island and Damariscove Island to Richard Russell, and sold half the Patent's land, half of his furniture, and half of his cattle for £200 to Paul White. In 1653, White and Elbridge conveyed the entire Moiety title to Russell and Nicholas Davidson, who in turn became sole owner of the patents from Russell in 1657. Elbridge continued to live in Pemaquid (Bristol) and called himself the "Merchant of Pemaquid" After the Second Anglo-Dutch War the Duke of York claimed the land as his under a royal charter.

Drowne's wife Katherine Clark, was a partial heir to the Davidson claim of the Pemaquid Patents, and Drowne acquired power of attorney from the other heirs. What became known as the "Drowne Claim" encompassed Bristol, Bremen, Damariscotta, and parts of Newcastle and Nobleboro. Other claims of the time included the "Brown Right" and the "Tappen Right." Starting in the 1730s, Drowne filed a number of depositions in order to gain control of the Drowne Claim.

On June 12, 1746, he bought Monhegan Island and its surrounding islands for £10, 13 shillings. His son later sold the island for £160. He died in 1774 and his estate bequested £6, 13s, 4d to the First Baptist Church of Boston.

== Personal life ==
Shem married Katherine Clark on September 18, 1712, in Boston. Katherine was the daughter of Capt. Timothy Clark and sister of Boston brazier and pewterer, Jonas Clark.

Shem was baptized in the First Baptist Church of Boston in 1713 along with the future pastor of that church. In May 1721, he was elected a Deacon of the church and served this position until his death in 1774.

Shem's older brother Solomon was the grandfather of Revolutionary War Surgeon Solomon Drowne. In 1721, he was made a deacon of the First Baptist Church of Boston.

Shem's younger brother Simeon (born April 8, 1686, died in Boston on August 2, 1734, buried in Copp's Hill Cemetery there) was a shipwright. It is believed that he created the framework for Shem's Grasshopper weathervane.

== In popular culture ==
Shem Drowne appears in the video game Fallout 4, where the grasshopper weathervane atop Faneuil Hall and the note Thomas placed within are central to the sidequest "The Gilded Grasshopper", in which the player is tasked with finding Shem Drowne's grave, containing Drowne's skeleton, to recover his treasure and a unique weapon.
