= Copp's Hill Burying Ground =

Historic cemetery in Boston, Massachusetts

- U.S. National Register of Historic Places
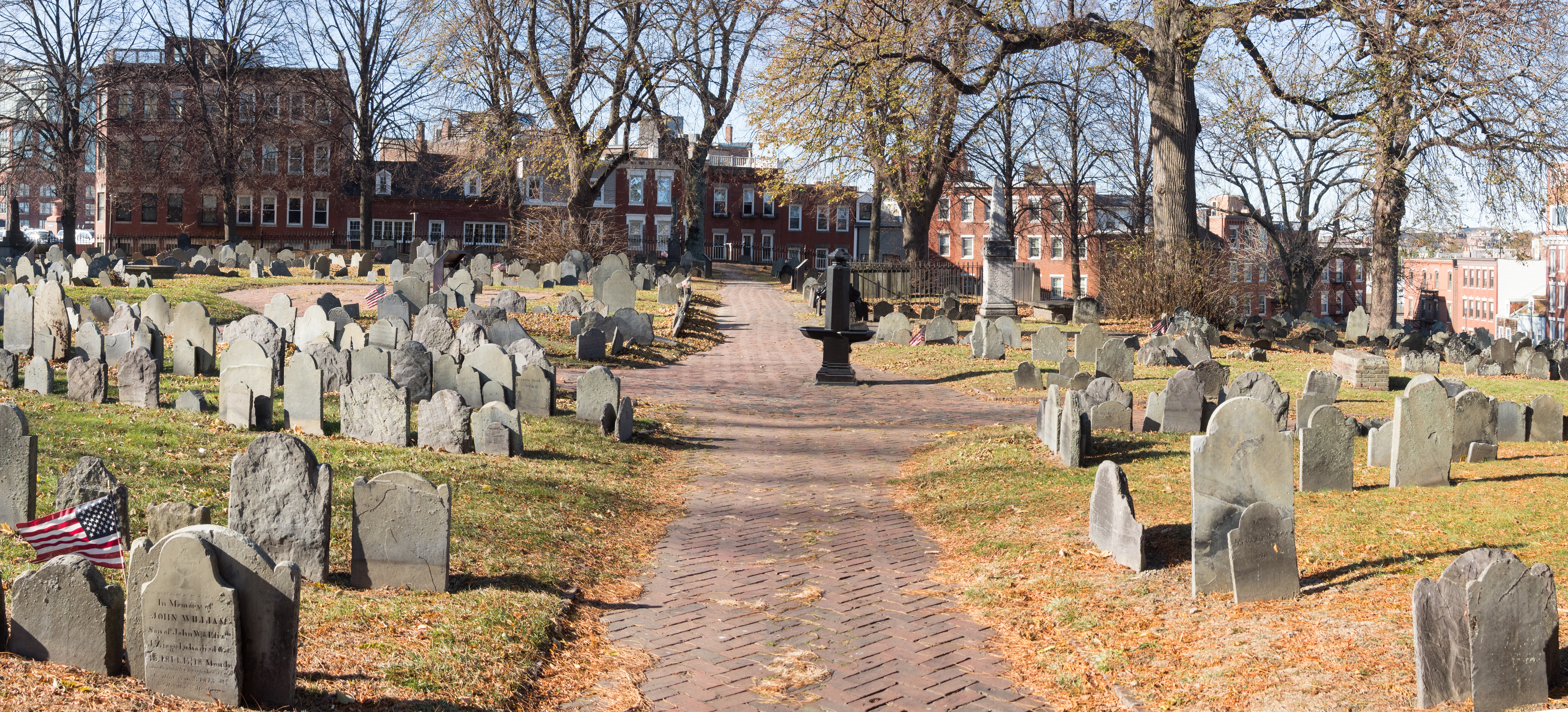

- Location within Boston Location within Massachusetts Location within the United States
- Interactive map of Copp's Hill Burying Ground
- Location: Boston, Massachusetts, U.S.
- Coordinates: 42.367322°N 71.055844°W
- Area: 2 acres (0.81 ha)
- Built: 1659
- NRHP reference No.: 74000385
- Added to NRHP: April 18, 1974

Copp's Hill Burying Ground is a historic cemetery in the North End of Boston, Massachusetts, United States. Established in 1659, it was originally named "North Burying Ground", and was the city's second cemetery.

== History ==
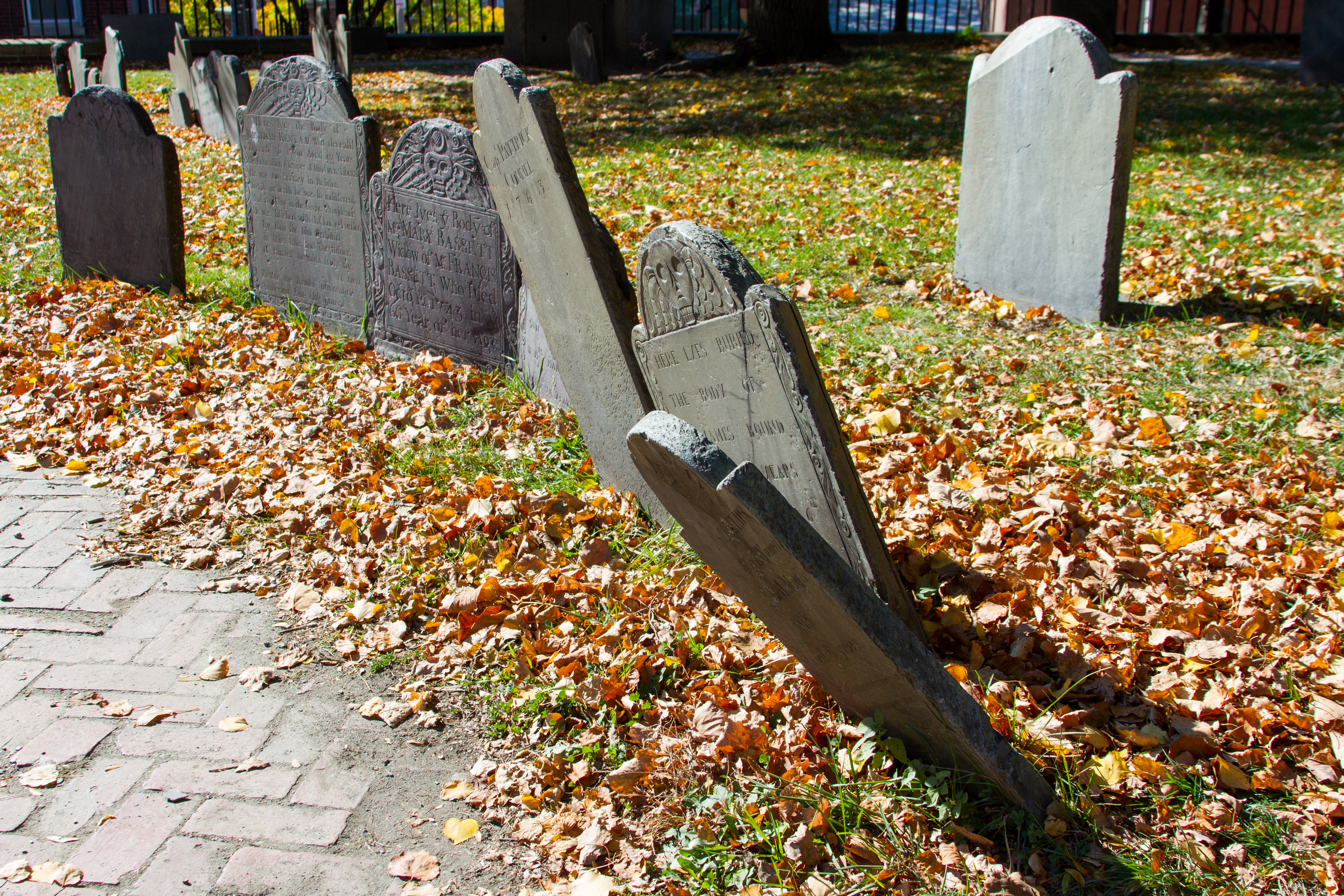
Several headstones from the 18th and 19th century in the cemetery

The cemetery was founded on February 20, 1659, when the town bought land on Copp's Hill from John Baker and Daniel Turell to start the "North Burying Ground". Now named "Copp's Hill Burying Ground" (although often referred to as "Copp's Hill Burial Ground"), it is the second-oldest cemetery in Boston (after King's Chapel Burying Ground, which was founded in 1630). It contains more than 1,200 marked graves, including the remains of various notable Bostonians from the colonial era into the 1850s.

The first extension was made on January 7, 1708, when the town bought additional land from Judge Samuel Sewall and his wife Hannah. The land was part of a pasture which Mrs. Sewall had inherited from her father, John Hull, master of the mint.

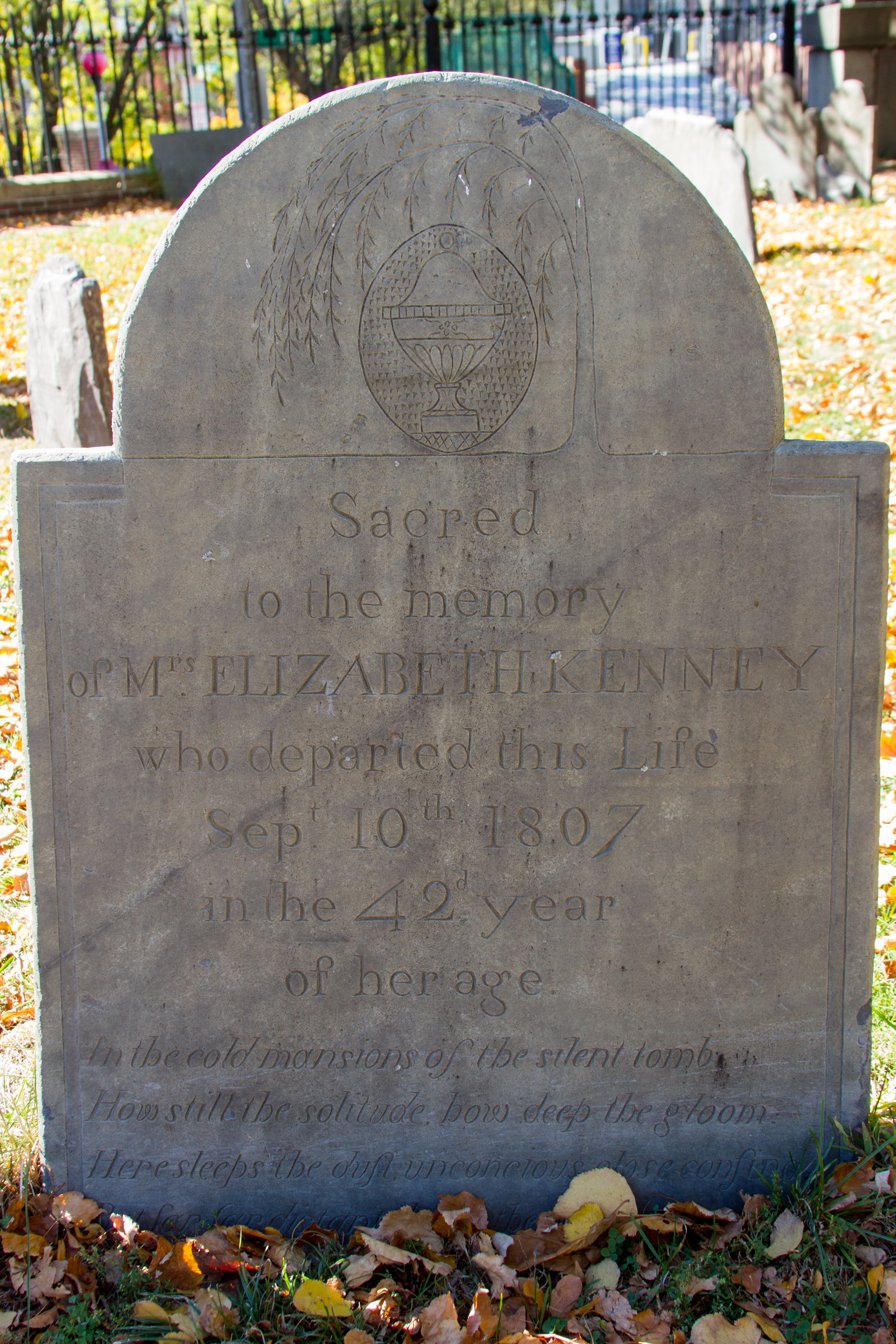
A still-legible headstone in Copp's Hill Burying Ground

Benjamin Weld and his wife Nabby sold the second extension to the town for $10,000 (~$222,482 in 2024) on December 18, 1809, soon after they had bought it from Jonathan Merry, who had used it as pasture. Ten years later, Charles Wells, later mayor of Boston, bought a small parcel of land from John Bishop of Medford and used this as a cemetery that was later merged with the adjacent North Burying Ground. Because of this complicated history, it is no longer possible to discern the original boundaries of the cemetery.

On the Snow Hill Street side are the many unmarked graves of the African Americans who lived in the "New Guinea" community at the foot of the hill. In addition to the graves there are 272 tombs, most of which bear inscriptions that are still legible.

By 1840 the cemetery had fallen into near disuse but the town continued to maintain the site intermittently. In the mid-19th century, the city reorganized the headstones into neat rows, in part to accommodate early lawn mowers for easier maintenance. By 1878 it was badly neglected. The cemetery was not an official stop on the Freedom Trail when it was created in 1951 but it has since been added and is much-frequented by tourists and photographers. The site was added to the National Register of Historic Places in 1974.

== Notable burials ==
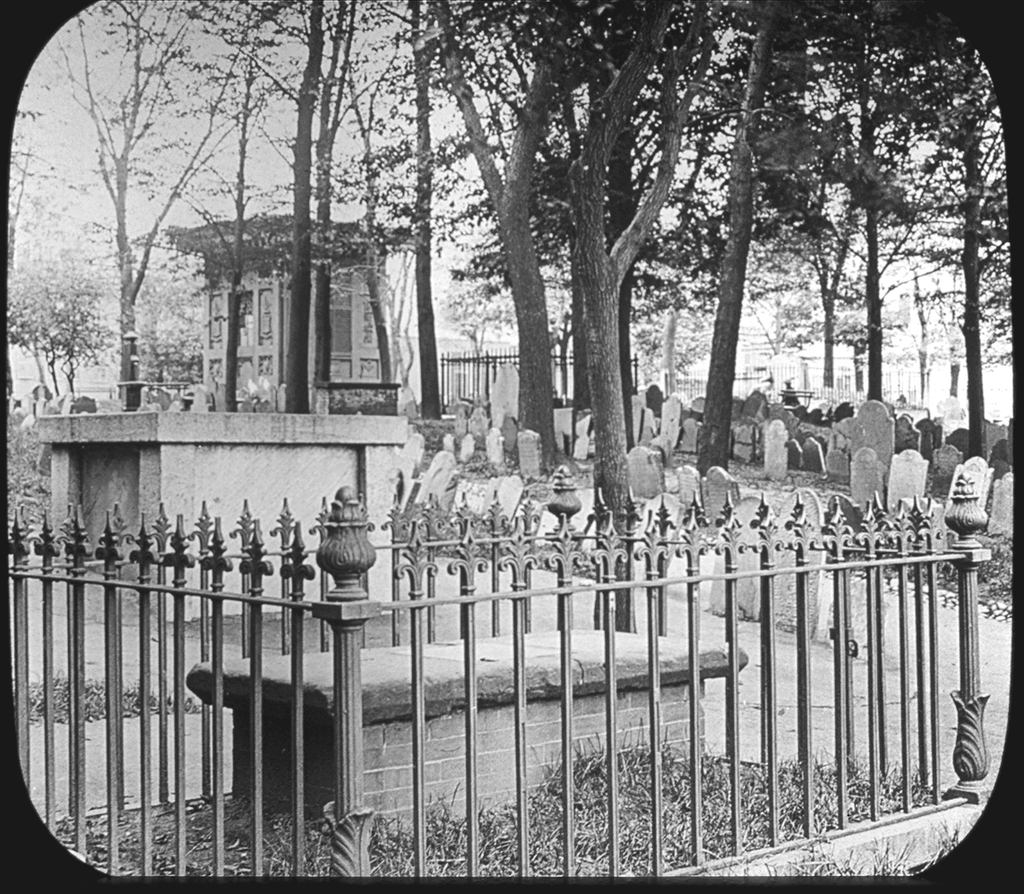
View of Copp's Hill Burying Ground, 1895

- William Copp's children
- Shem Drowne, coppersmith, author of the grasshopper weathervane atop Faneuil Hall
- Benjamin Edes, journalist and agitator
- F. W. P. Greenwood, Unitarian minister of King's Chapel in Boston
- Prince Hall, abolitionist and founder of Black Freemasonry
- Edmund Hartt, master carpenter
- Samuel Mather, Independent minister
- Increase Mather, Puritan minister
- Cotton Mather, Puritan minister
- Robert Newman, one of two patriots who placed the signal lanterns in the steeple of Old North Church for Paul Revere's midnight ride to Lexington and Concord
- John Norman, publisher
- Major Samuel Shaw, first American consul at Canton
- Nicholas Upsall, Puritan and later Quaker leader
- John Webster, Lecturer at Harvard Medical College who murdered George Parkman in 1849
- Phillis Wheatley, first published woman of African descent, poet, former slave
- George Worthylake, first keeper of the Boston Light

== See also ==
- National Register of Historic Places listings in northern Boston
- List of cemeteries in Boston
