= Copp's Hill =

Hill in Boston, Massachusetts

A Freedom Trail sign on Copp's Hill with the Skinny House in the background

Copp's Hill is an elevation in the historic North End of Boston, Massachusetts. It is bordered by Hull Street, Charter Street and Snow Hill Street. The hill takes its name from William Copp, a shoemaker who lived nearby. Copp's Hill Burying Ground is a stop on the Freedom Trail.

== Early history ==
Like all of the Shawmut Peninsula, the hill was Algonquian territory before the establishment of the Massachusetts Bay Colony. The first English settlers to the hill arrived in the 1630s and built a windmill atop the hill to grind grain.

== Copp's Hill Burying Ground ==
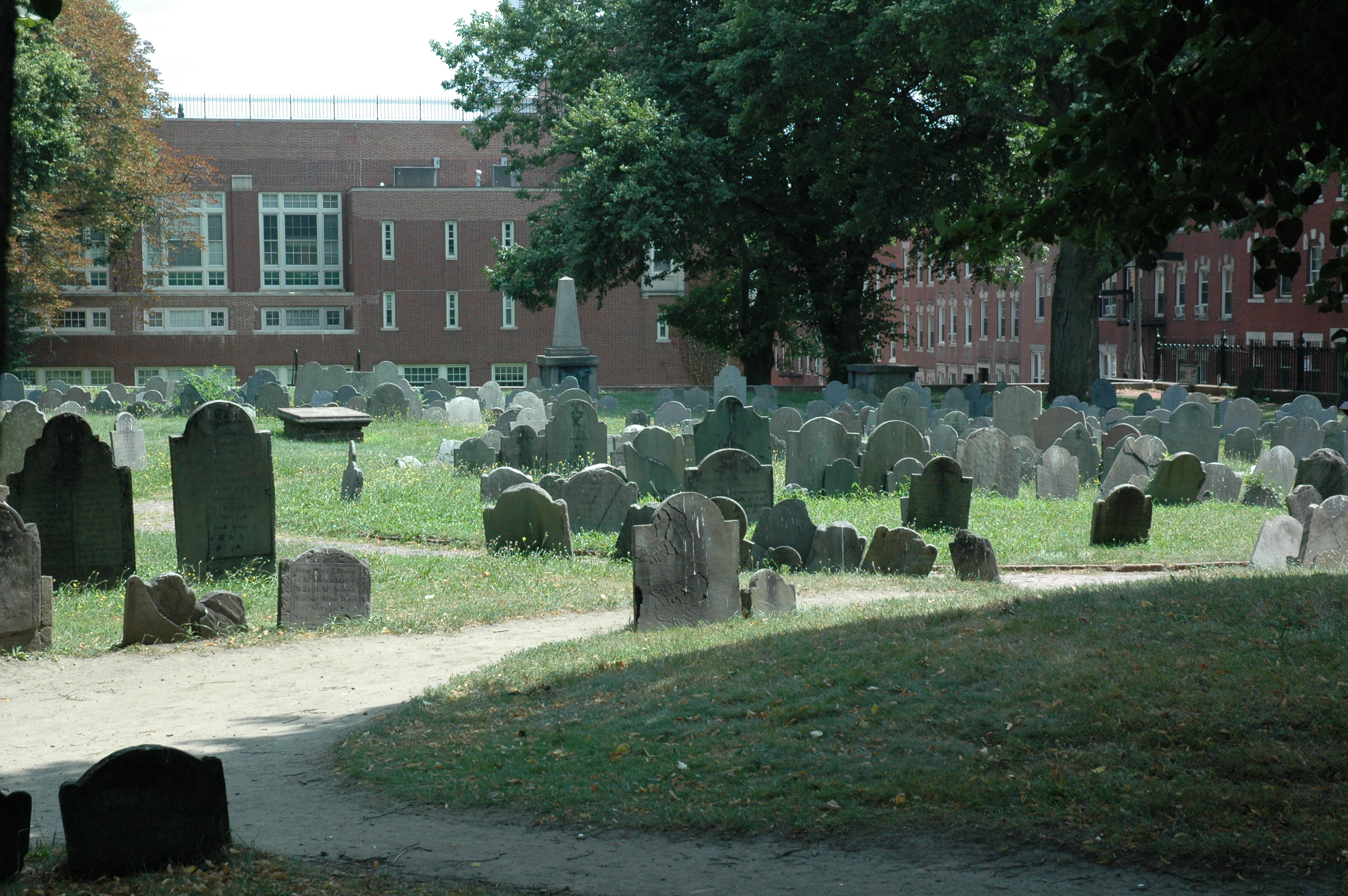
Copp's Hill Burying Ground

Founded by the town of Boston in 1659, Copp's Hill Burying Ground is the second oldest burying ground in the city. The cemetery's boundaries were extended several times, and the grounds contain the remains of many notable Bostonians in the thousands of graves and 272 tombs.

Among the Bostonians buried here are the original owner, William Copp, his children, Increase Mather, Cotton Mather, Robert Newman and John Pulling (the patriots who placed the signal lanterns in the steeple of Old North Church for Paul Revere's midnight ride to Lexington and Concord), Prince Hall (the father of Black Freemasonry), and many unmarked graves of the African Americans who lived in the "New Guinea" community at the foot of the hill. The cemetery was not an official stop on the Freedom Trail when it was created in 1951, but it has since been added and is much-frequented by tourists and photographers.

== Revolutionary War ==
During the Revolutionary War, the British used the hill to train artillery onto Charlestown during the Battle of Bunker Hill. For several years starting in 1806, soil was taken from the top of Copp's Hill to increase the available building land by filling the Mill Pond. This removal reduced the height of the hill by about 7 feet (about 2 meters).

== Skinny House ==
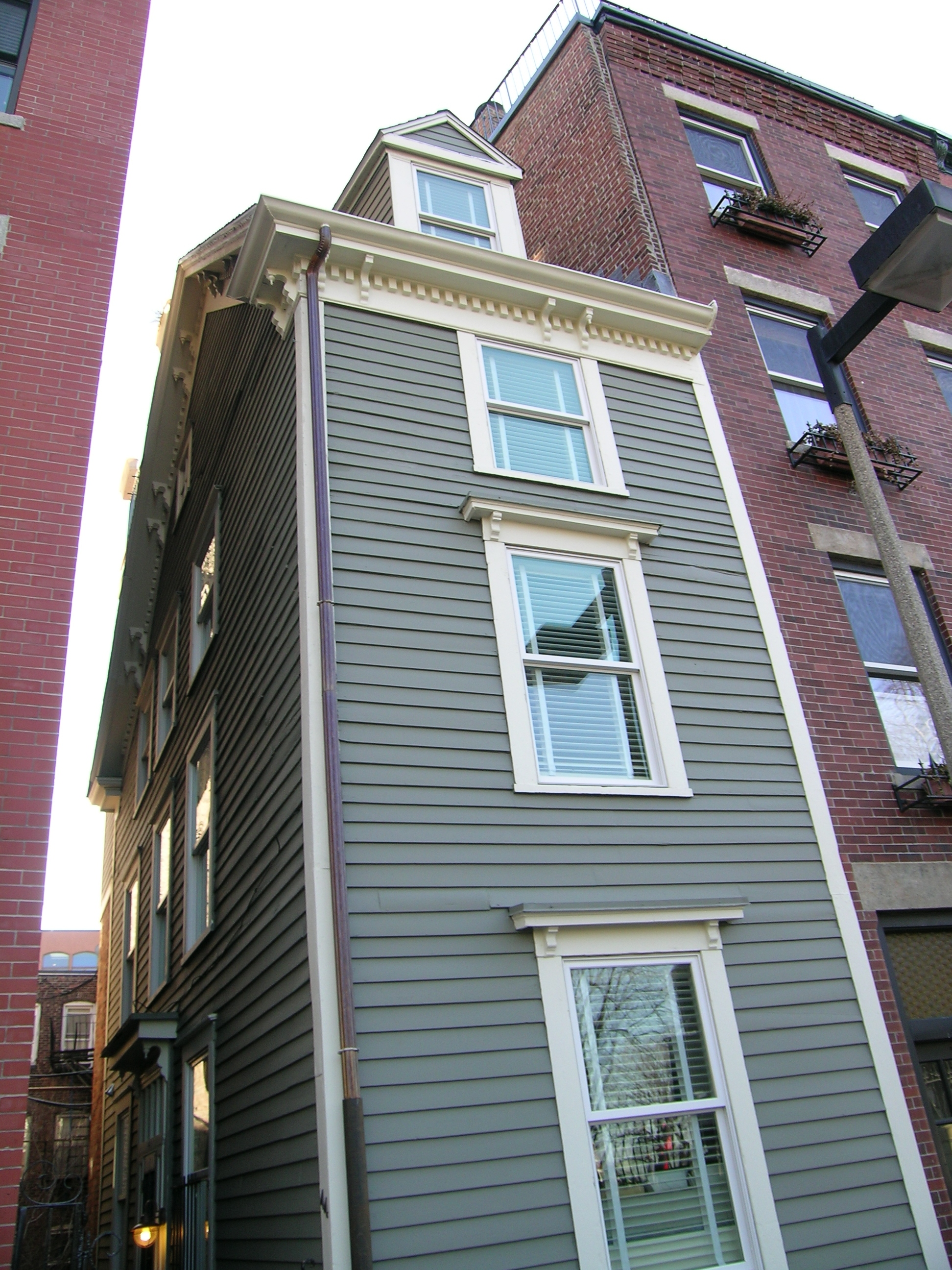
The Skinny House

Across Hull street from the Copp's Hill Burying Ground is an extremely narrow four-story spite house built shortly after the Civil War. Only 10.4 feet (3.2 m) wide at its widest point, the house is reported by The Boston Globe as having the "uncontested distinction of being the narrowest house in Boston."

== The vista ==
Copp's Hill is the highest point in the North End and is the third highest hill in Boston after Beacon Hill and Fort Hill. As such, Copp's Hill provides a view of numerous local landmarks. The Old North Church stands at one end of Hull Street. In the opposite direction, the Leonard P. Zakim Bunker Hill Memorial Bridge and the TD Garden are visible not far away. Over local rooftops the upper levels of Custom House Tower, One International Place, and other buildings in the Financial District can be glimpsed. Beyond the other side of the hill, across the Charles River in Charlestown, the USS Constitution and the USS Cassin Young may be seen docked at Boston Navy Yard with the Bunker Hill Monument in the distance.

== Gallery ==
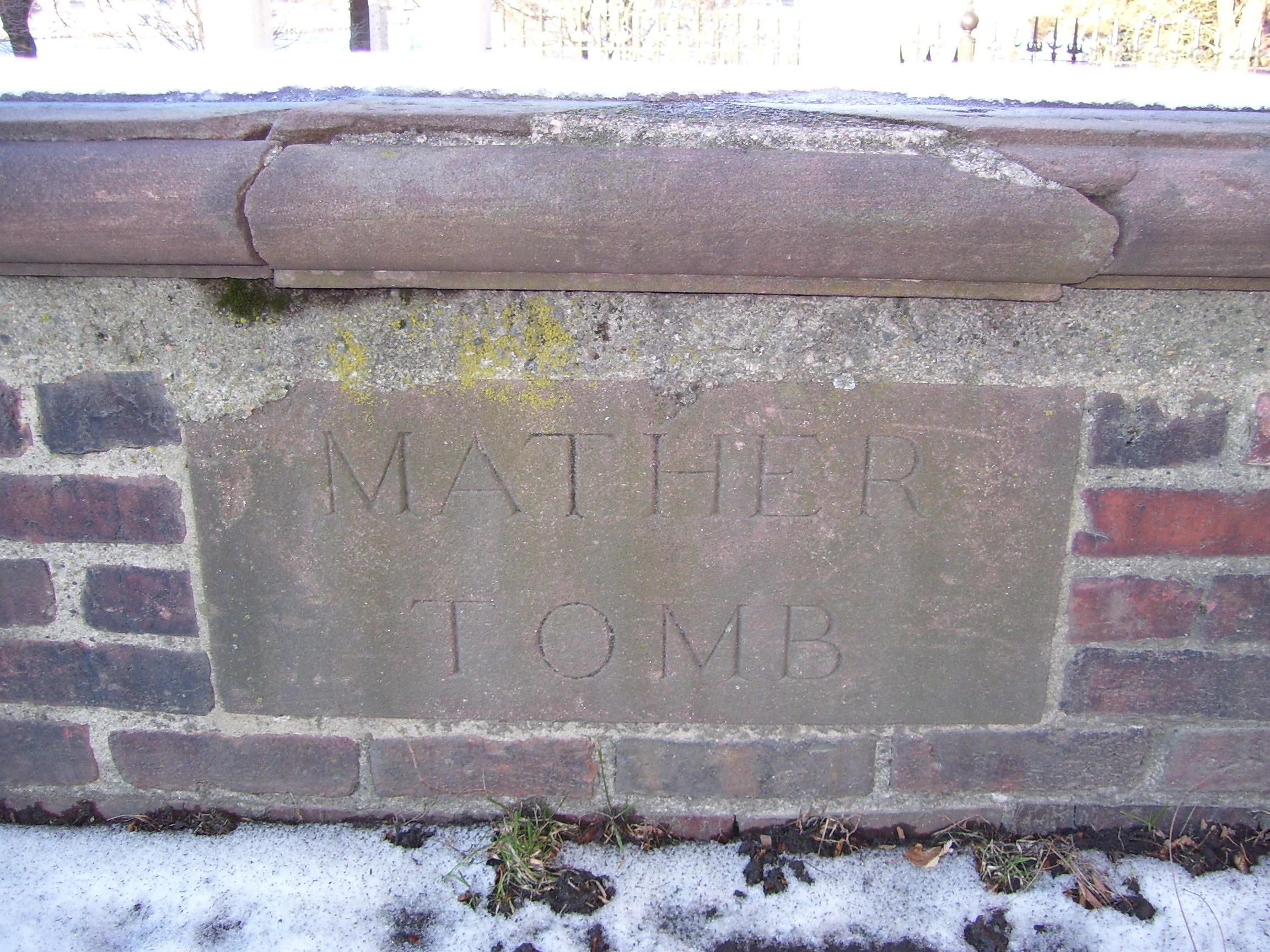
The Mather family tomb in Copp's Hill Burying Ground

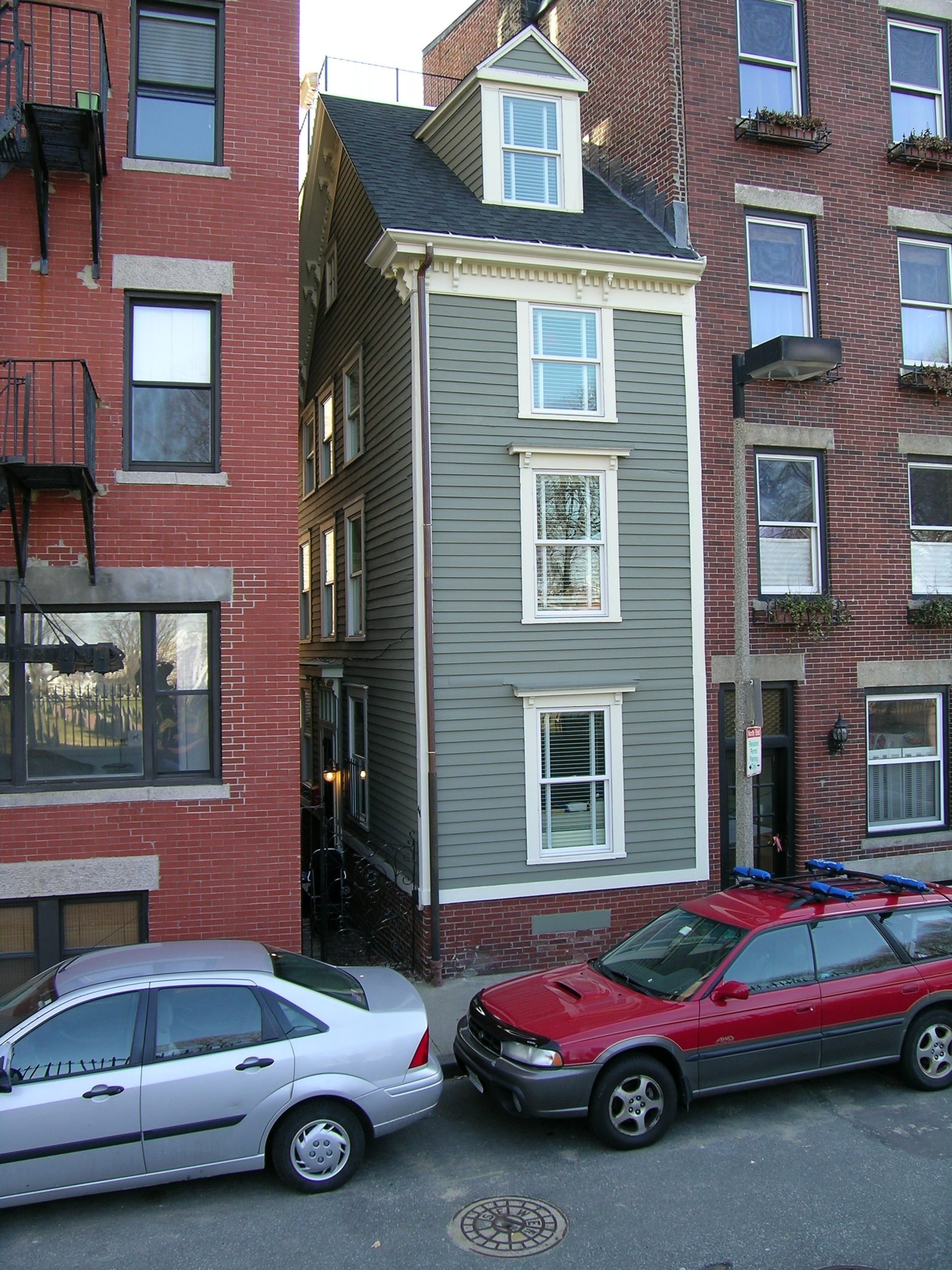
The Skinny House on Hull Street

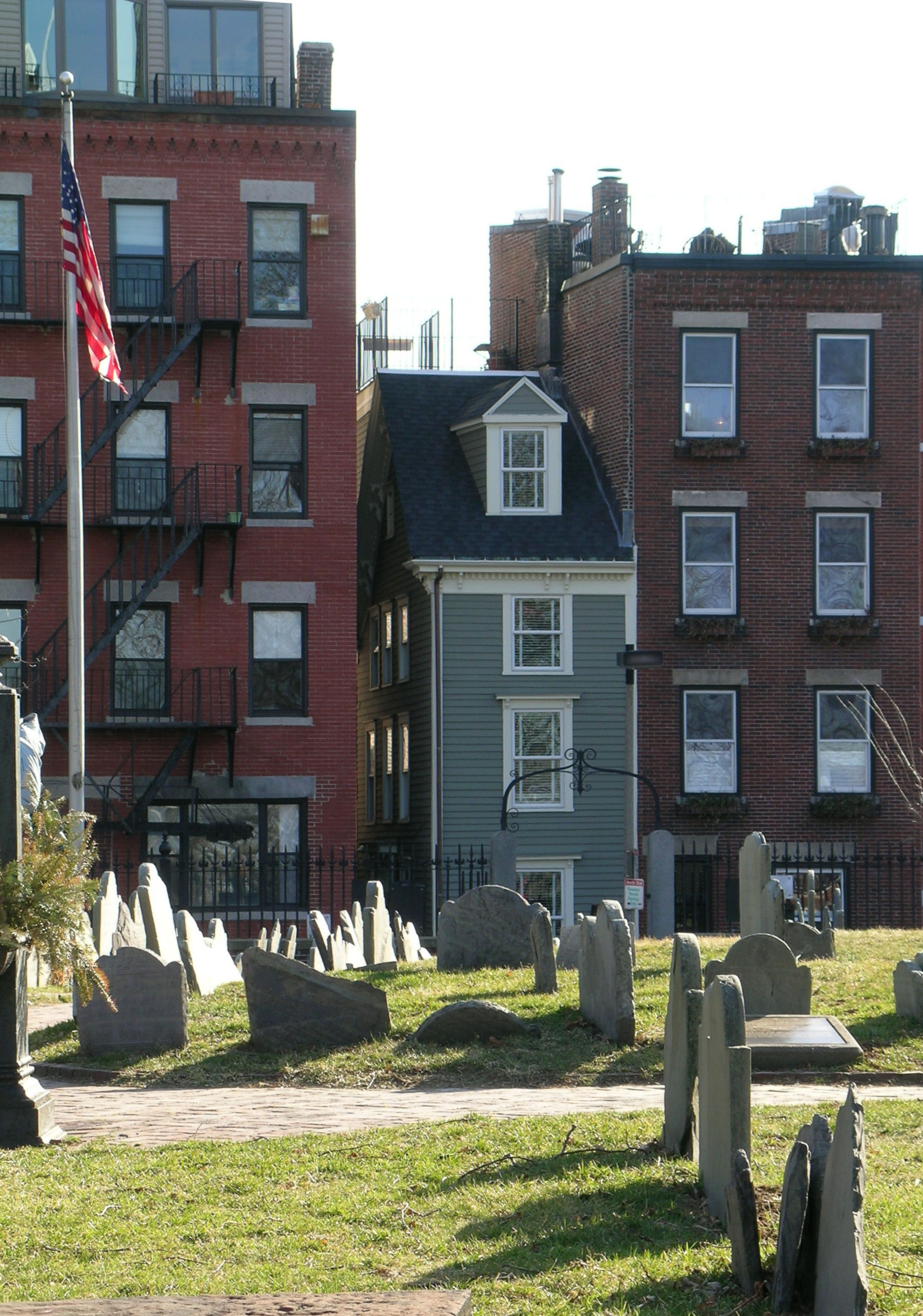
The Skinny House with Copp's Hill Burying Ground in the foreground

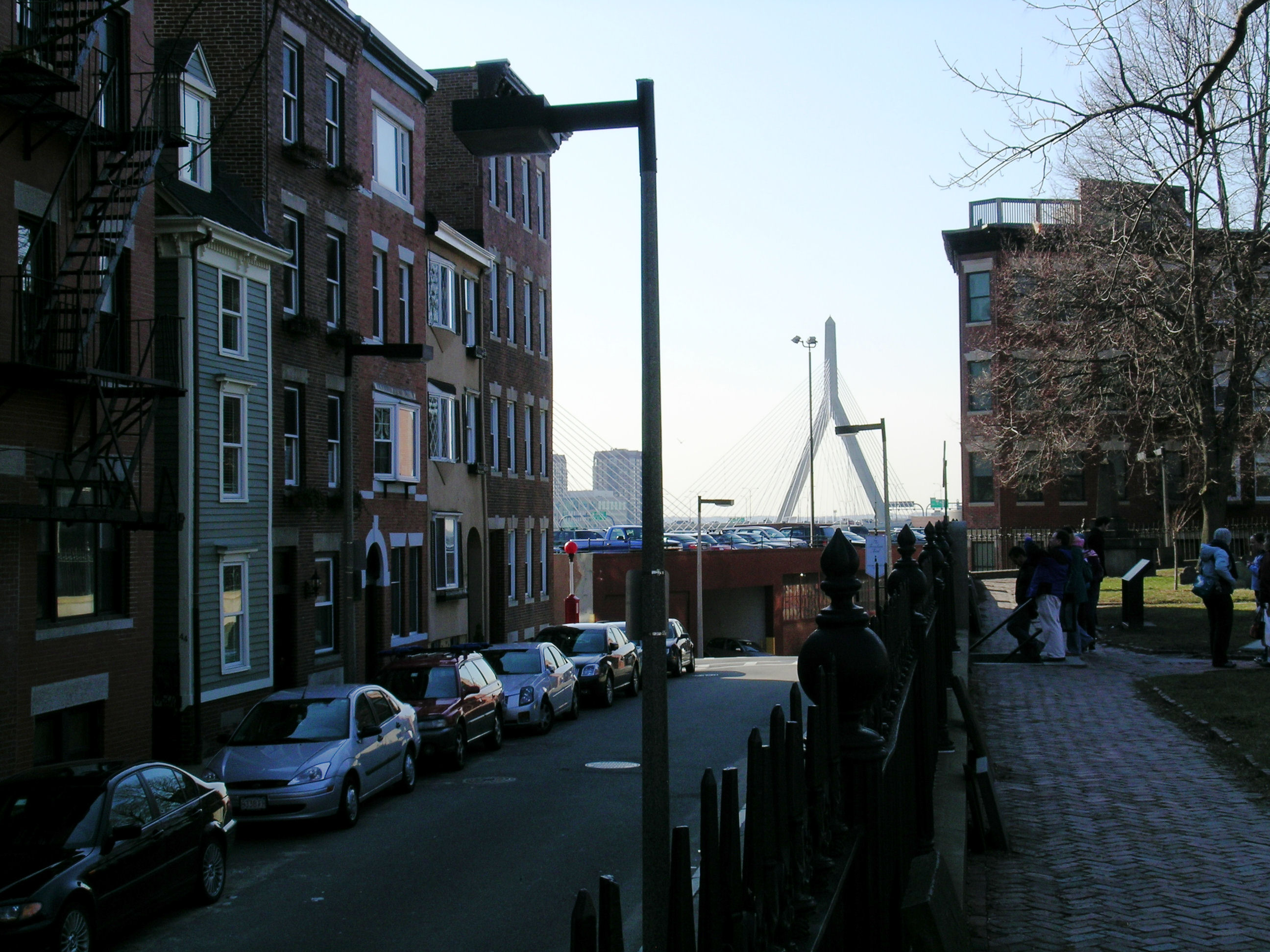
From left to right can be seen the Skinny House, the Leonard P. Zakim Bunker Hill Memorial Bridge, and the Copp's Hill Burying Ground.

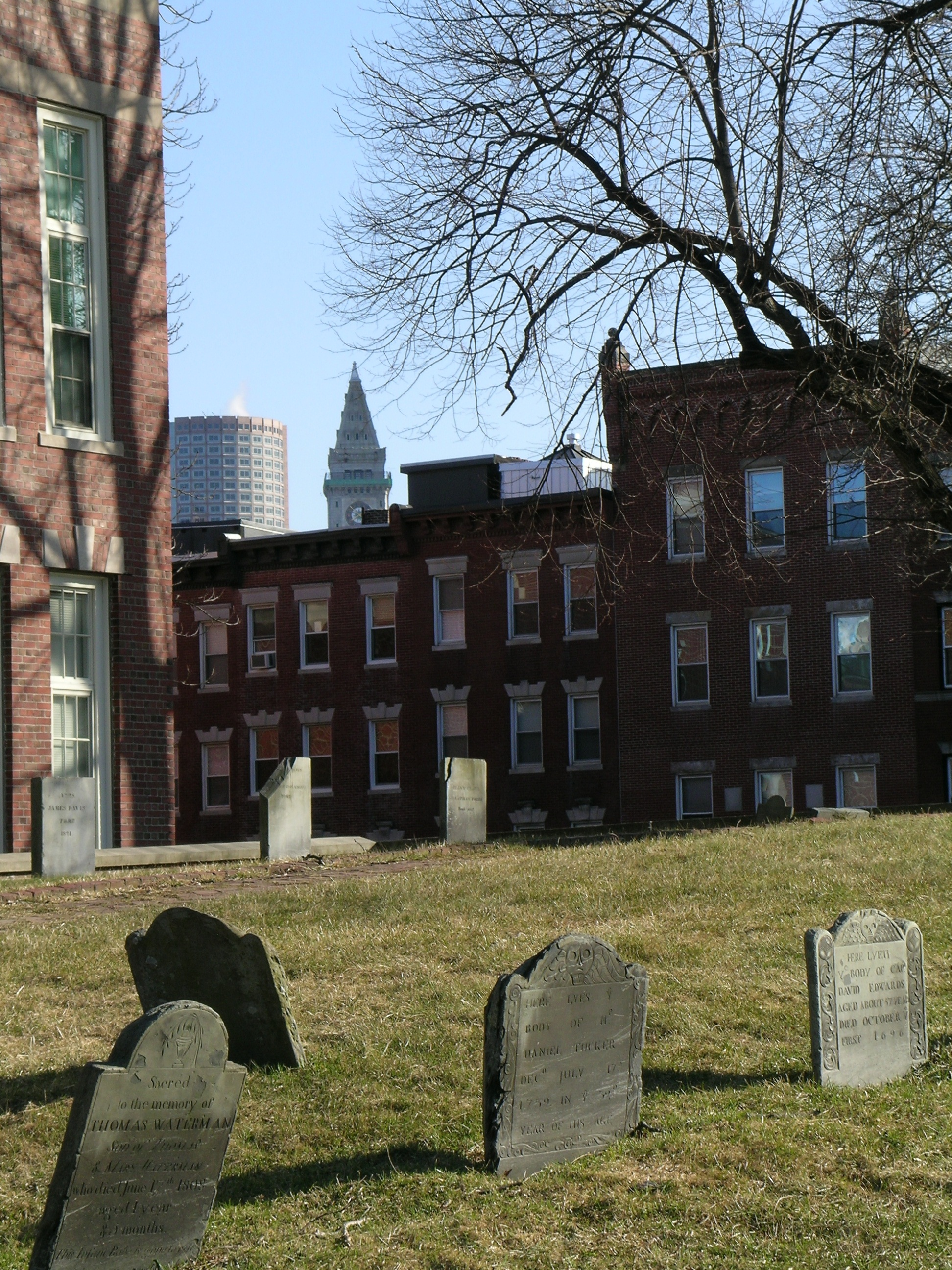
The Copp's Hill Burying Ground in the foreground with the Custom House Tower and One International Place glimpsed in the background.

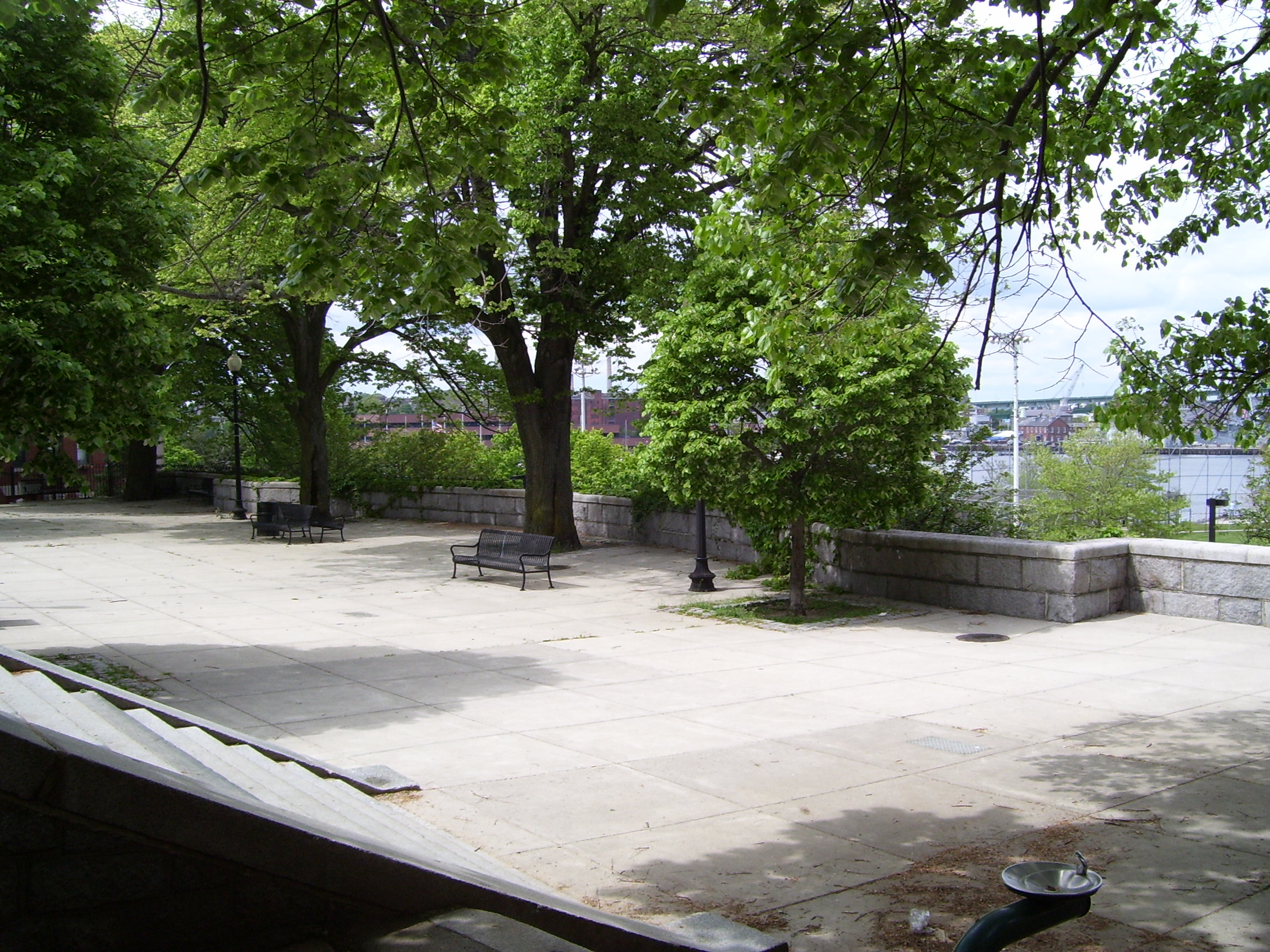
Copp's Hill Terrace

Preceded by Old North Church	Locations along Boston's Freedom Trail; Copp's Hill	Succeeded by USS Constitution
