= Smallest House in Great Britain =

Smallest inhabitable house in the UK

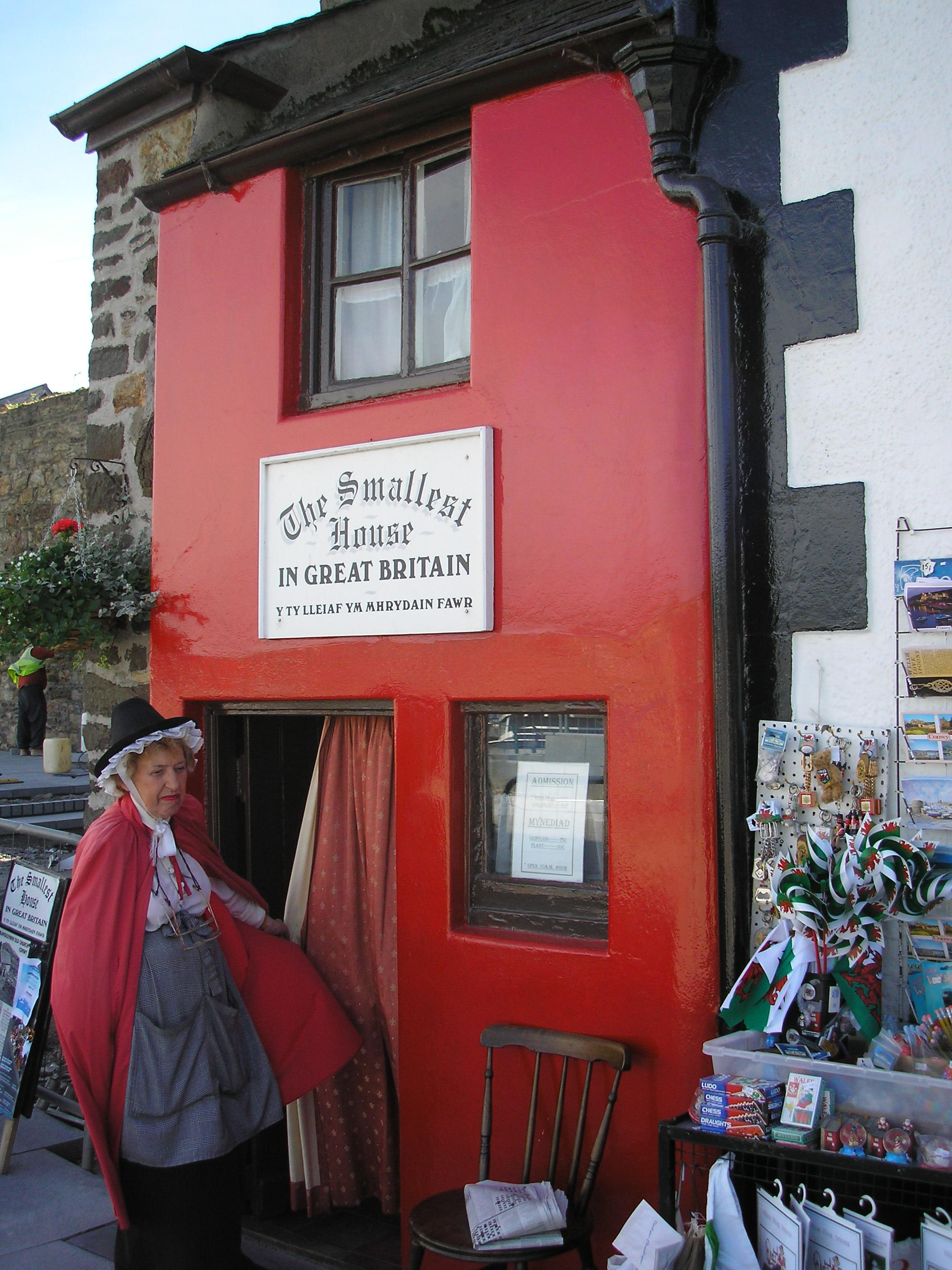

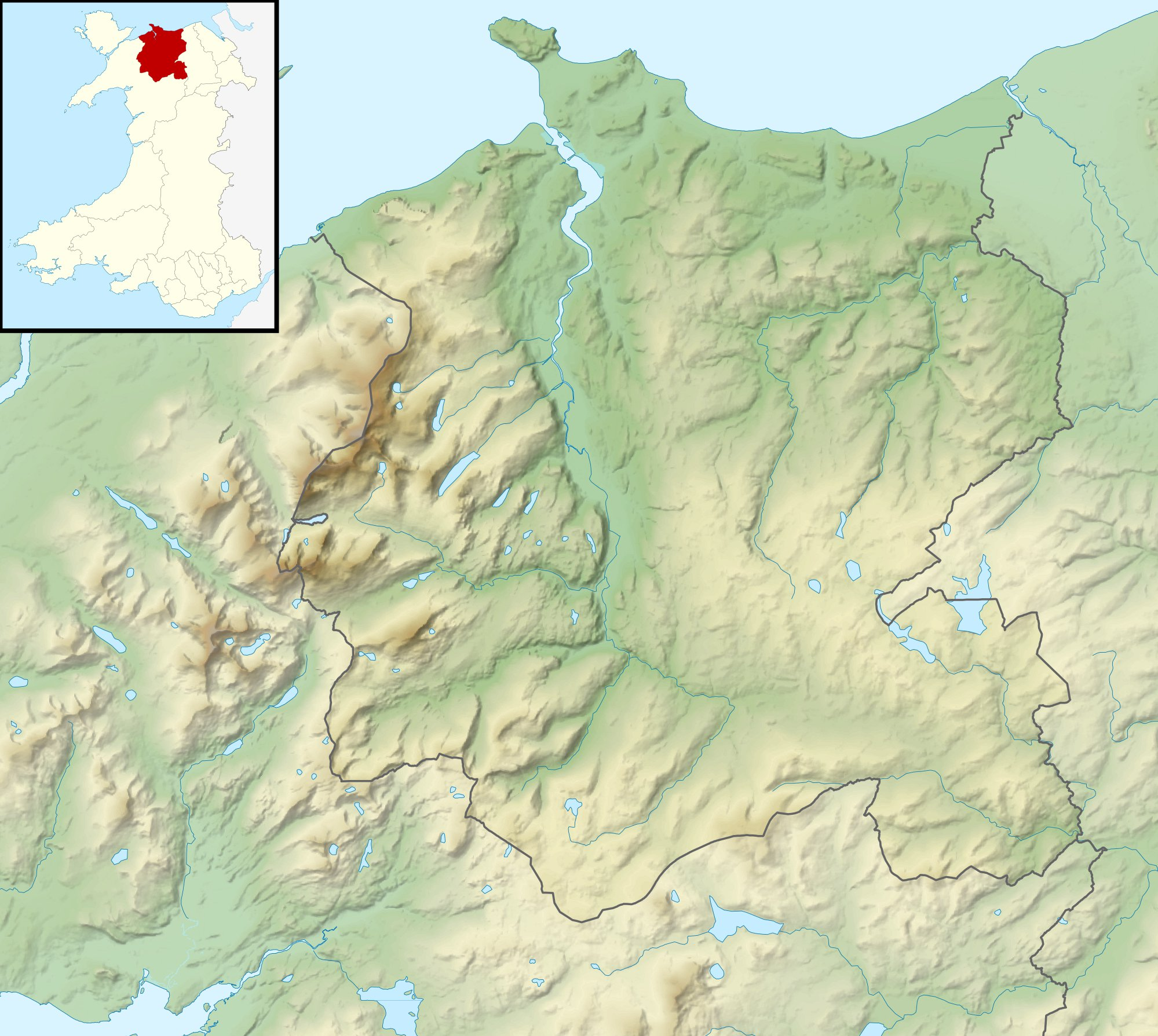
- Location within Conwy
- 53.2824°N 3.8285°W
- Location: 11 Lower Gate Street Conwy, Wales LL32 8BE

History
- Built: 16th century

The Smallest House in Great Britain (Welsh: Y Tŷ Lleiaf ym Mhrydain Fawr), also known as the Quay House, is a tourist attraction on the quay in Conwy, Wales. It is reputed to be the smallest house in the United Kingdom.

== History ==
The minuscule home was built in the 16th century and remained in use until 1900, when the tenant was a 6-foot-3-inch (1.91 m) fisherman named Robert Jones. The rooms were too small for him to stand up in fully and he was eventually forced to move out when the council declared the house unfit for human habitation, along with a number of properties. The house is owned by the landlord's descendants, the landlord being a man also named Robert Jones, having been passed to female relatives since Robert's sons showed a lack of interest in the business.

After some persuasion by the then editor of the North Wales Weekly News, Roger Dawson (the owner) and the editor toured the United Kingdom in order to declare the house The Smallest House in Great Britain, a status that was later confirmed by the Guinness Book of Records.

== Architecture ==
The house has a floor area of 3.05 by 1.8 m (10.0 by 5.9 ft) and is painted red. It stands near the Conwy Castle walls. The ground floor is devoted to the living area with room for coal and an open fire, and a water tap tucked behind the stairs. The upstairs holds the cramped bedroom, which also comes with a small niche for storage.

=== Tourism ===
Tours of the house occur daily. Admission is £1.50 for adults or £1.00 for children; there is information about the house inside. A Welsh lady in traditional clothing stands outside when the house is open and will tell visitors about the history of the house. Visitors are unable to go upstairs to the first floor, due to structural instability, but can view it from the step ladder. It is open from spring to autumn.

== Gallery ==
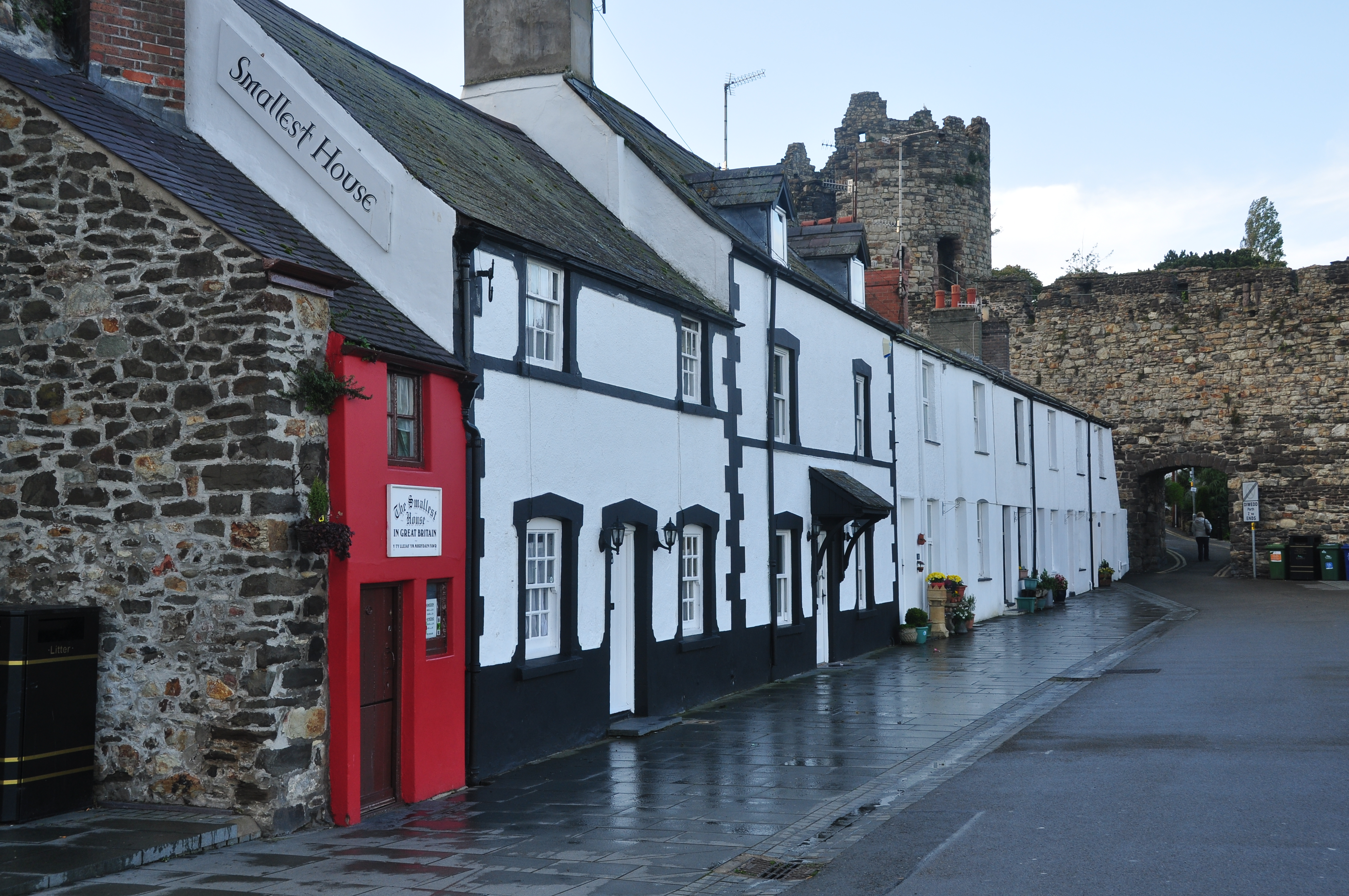
Quay House, alongside other properties

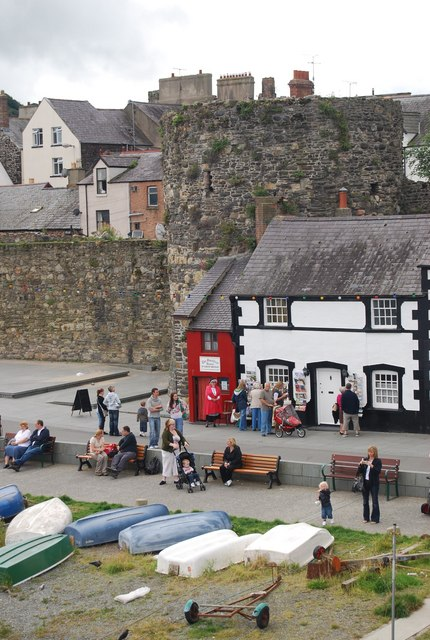
Image of the House in the Quay

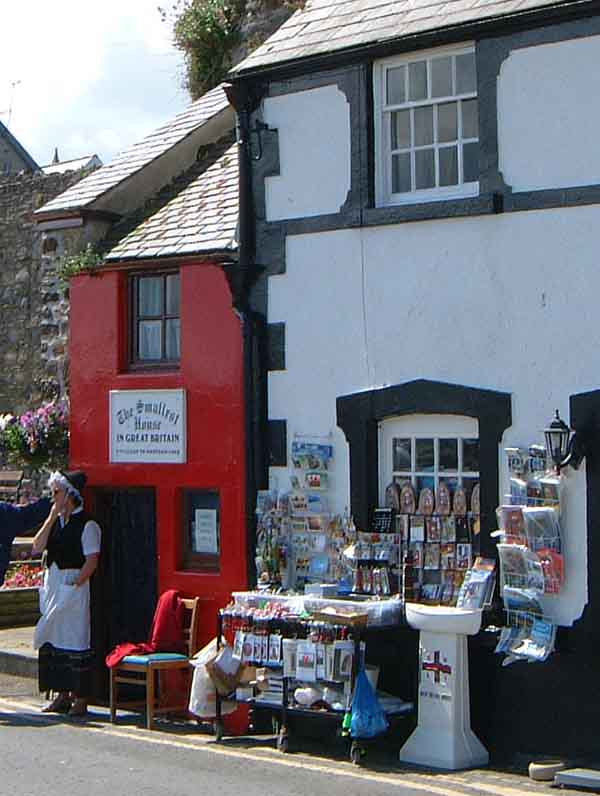
Woman in traditional clothing standing in front of the house

== See also ==
- Aberconwy House
- Conwy Castle
- Smallest house in Amsterdam
