= Skinny House (Boston) =

House in Boston, Massachusetts

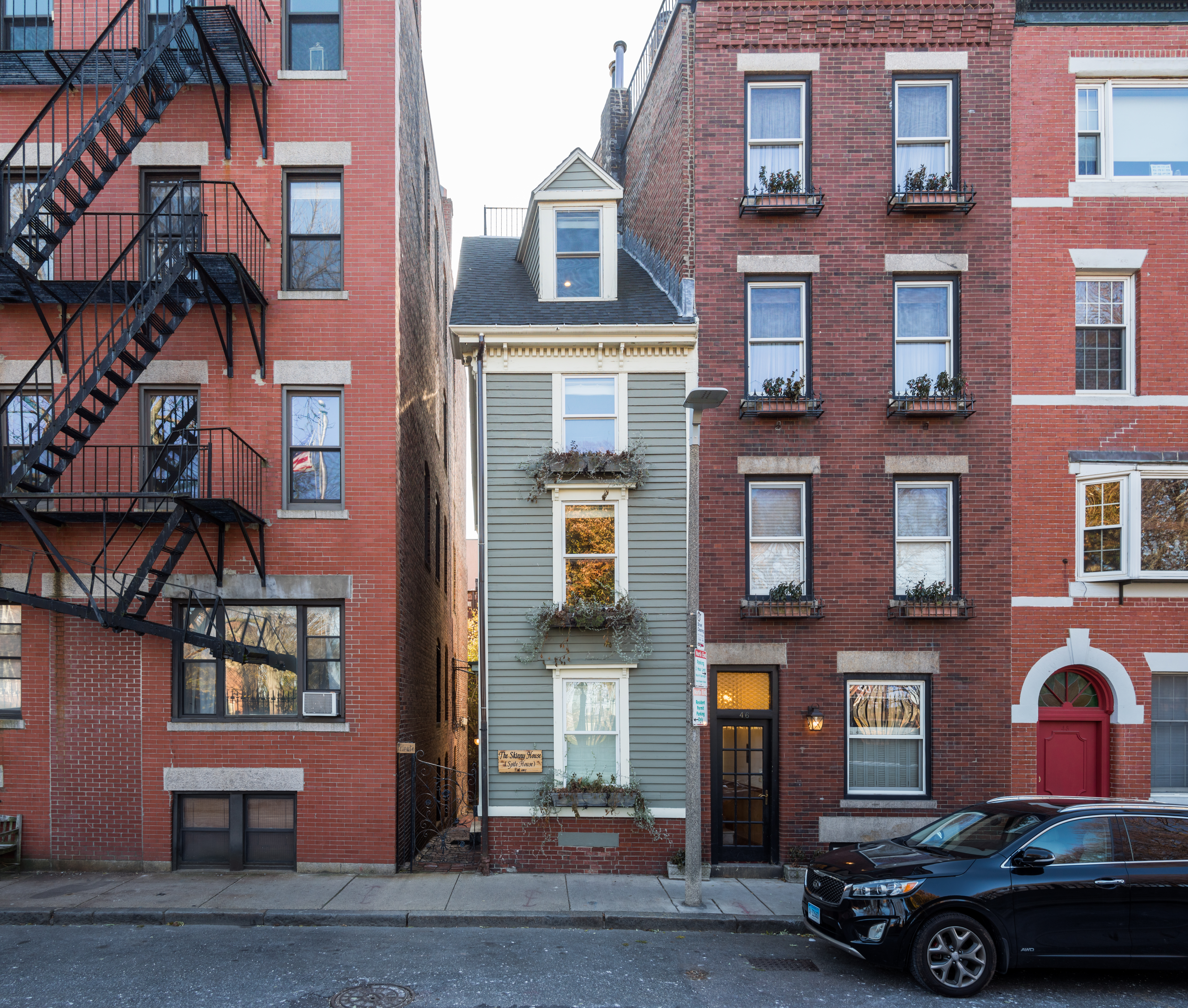
- The Skinny House in November 2019
- Interactive map of the Skinny House area

General information
- Location: Boston, Massachusetts, United States
- Coordinates: 42.366907°N 71.056212°W
- Completed: circa 1870s

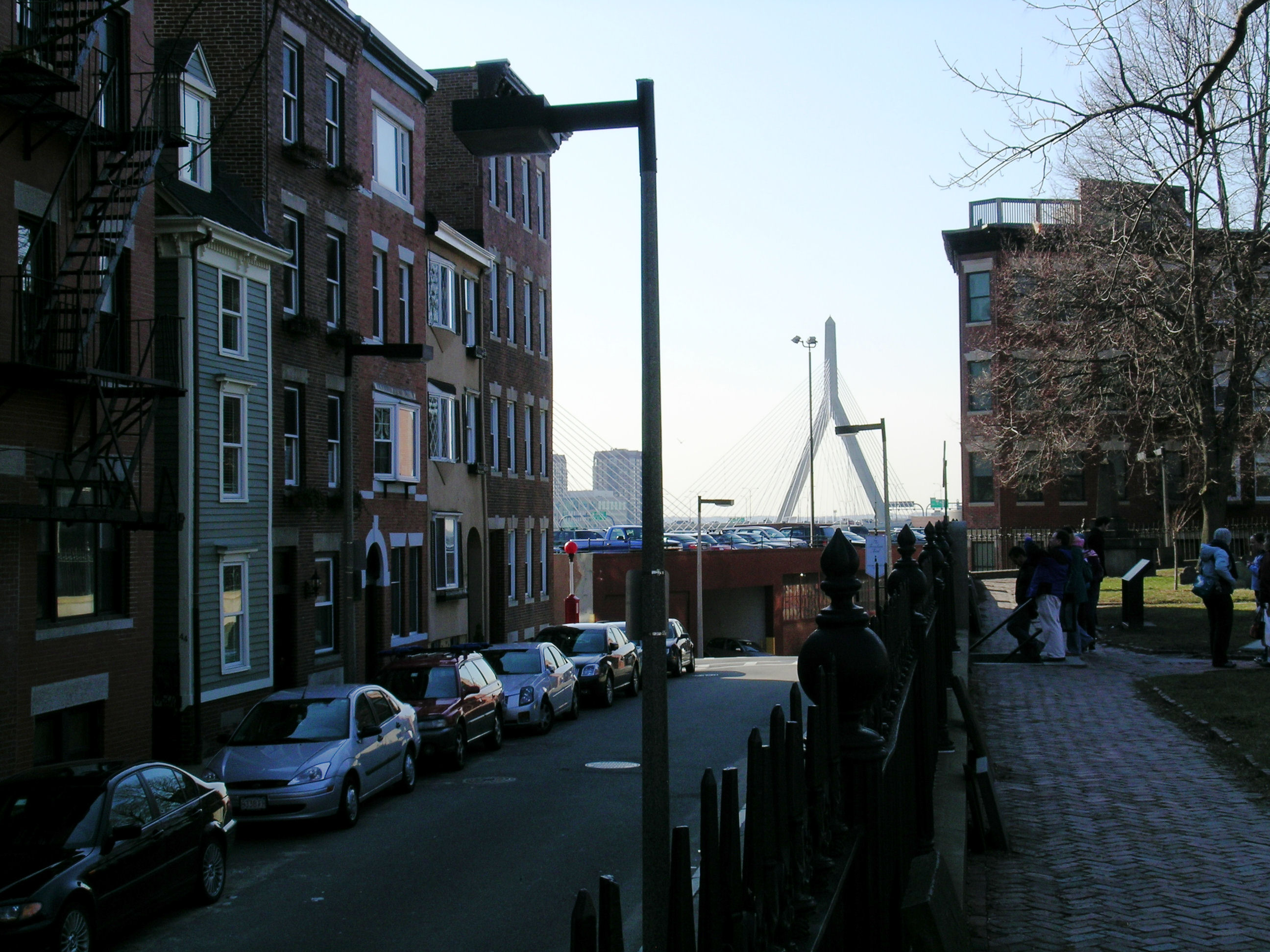
From left to right: the Skinny House, the Leonard P. Zakim Bunker Hill Memorial Bridge, and the Copp's Hill Burying Ground.

The Skinny House is an extremely narrow four-story house at 44 Hull Street in the North End of Boston, Massachusetts, United States. It is reported by The Boston Globe as having the "uncontested distinction of being the narrowest house in Boston." According to the executive director of the Boston Landmarks Commission, "In a city where there are many narrow lots, this far exceeds the norm. ... As far as we know, it is the narrowest house in Boston." According to local legend, it was built as a spite house.

The house spans 10.4 feet (3.16 m) at Hull Street, its widest point. The house tapers to 9.25 feet (2.82 m) at the back. Inside the house, the outer walls are as little as 8.4 feet (2.56 m) apart and none are more than 9.2 feet (2.80 m) apart. The home's narrowest interior point is 6.2 feet (1.89 m) across, close enough to allow an adult to touch opposing walls.

There are only five doors in the house, despite it having four levels. The second floor holds the living room and the bathroom, one of the few spaces separated by a door. In 2005, former owners Jennifer Simonic and Spencer Welton were described in the Boston Globe as living "a vertical life".

Simonic described:

We had a party of 10 one New Year's Eve, and when one person has to go to the bathroom, everyone has to move. ... We've had people just walk into our backyard and sit at our picnic table. ... They say, "We'll just be a couple of minutes; we just want to take a couple of pictures." That was bizarre.

According to Welton, who has a degree in architecture, "Instead of doors, we have floors between each space. ... When guests stay over, we put a mattress down on the closet floor. ... Except for sleeping in the closet, they seem to like it."

== History ==
According to local legend, the structure was built as a "spite house" shortly after the Civil War:

... two brothers inherited land from their deceased father. While one brother was away serving in the military, the other built a large home, leaving the soldier only a shred of property that he felt certain was too tiny to build on. When the soldier returned, he found his inheritance depleted and built the narrow house to spite his brother by blocking the sunlight and ruining his view.

Another source states:

Not much is known about the city's narrowest house. Legend has it that ... its unnamed builder erected it to shut off air and light from the home of a hostile neighbor (also nameless) with whom he had a dispute. ... Believed to have been built after 1874.

According to an article published on Boston.com in 2021, historical records indicate that the current-day “Skinny House” at 44 Hull Street is actually what remains of what was once a larger structure, originally built as a double house/duplex c. 1857 at 46-48 Hull Street and further subdivided into three properties (numbered 44, 46, and 48 Hull Street) within the same footprint in 1884. The current-day Skinny House was the easternmost portion of this building, and was also the narrowest of the three post-1884 units due to the alleyway on the eastern side of the property. Sometime after 1884, the portion of the building at 46-48 Hull Street was demolished and replaced with two larger, attached brick houses, leaving the Skinny House at 44 Hull Street as the only extant portion of the original c. 1857 building. This explains various idiosyncrasies of the house in its current state, such as the asymmetrical roof trim.

According to an assistant archivist at the Boston City Archives, the footprint of 44 Hull Street appeared in The Hopkins Atlas of 1874, Boston Proper. The land was split into five lots in 1884. The smallest of these lots measured only 274 square feet (25.5 m^{2}). This corresponds to the size of the house before renovations that lengthened it.

== Location ==
The house stands near the top of Copp's Hill, across the street from the historic Copp's Hill Burying Ground and within sight of Old North Church, both official stops on Boston's historic Freedom Trail.
