= Skinny House (Long Beach) =

Building in California, United States

Coordinates: 33°46′32.2″N 118°09′27.7″W

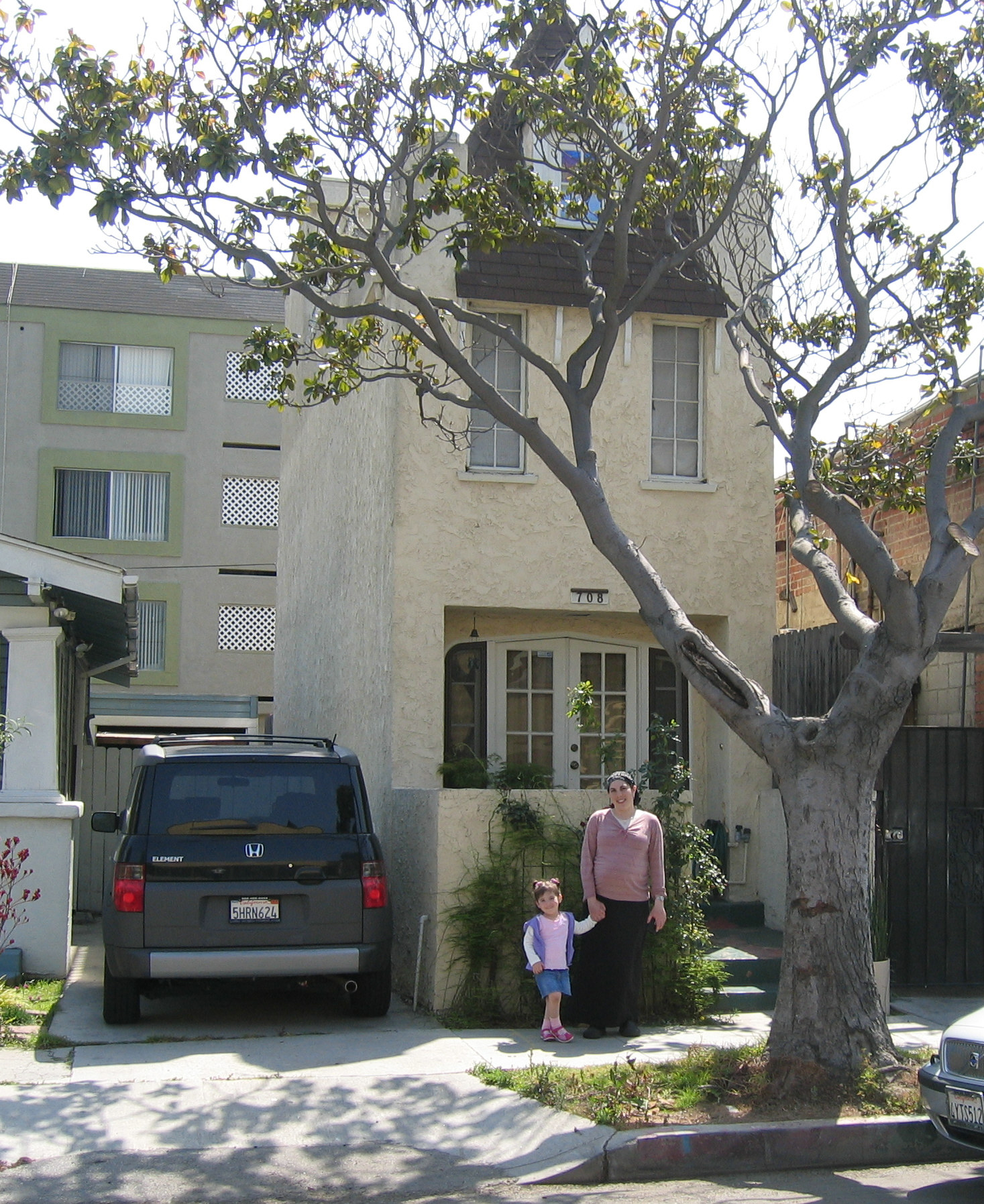
The Skinniest House in America, located at 708 Gladys Avenue in Long Beach, California

The aptly nicknamed Skinny House at 708 Gladys Avenue (corner of 7th Street) in the Rose Park neighborhood of Long Beach, California, United States, is a narrow three-story house that has been cited by both the Guinness Book of World Records and Ripley's Believe It or Not as the nation's skinniest house.

The yellow-stuccoed house was built on a lot measuring 10 feet (3.0 m) by 50 feet (15 m) in 1932 by Newton P. Rummonds, who received the land as a repayment for a $100 loan one year earlier. He built the 860-square-foot (80 m^{2}) house after someone bet him that he could not build a habitable house on such a small lot.

In 1959, it was discovered that the house had leaned 4 inches (100 mm) to the north and was straightened. The Skinny House is a registered city landmark of Long Beach, California, as of 1983.

Public interest lawyer William John Cox maintained his law practice in Skinny House between 1977 and 1981, including his prosecution of the Holocaust denial case.

The house was featured in a segment of The Early Show.

== See also ==
- List of City of Long Beach Historic Landmarks
