= Pie house =

Building in Deerfield, Illinois, United States

The pie house
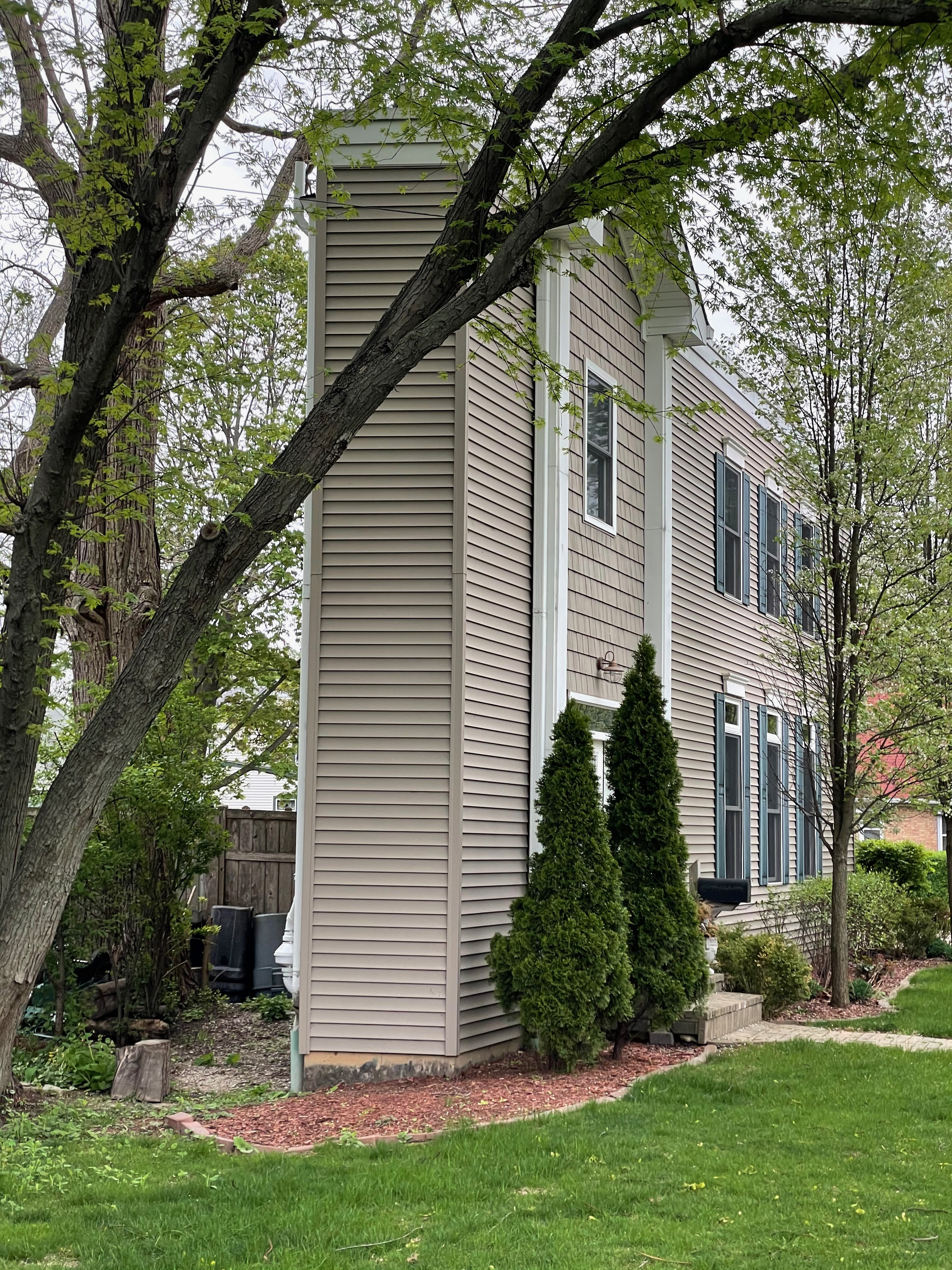
- The eastern end of the pie house

General information
- Address: 970 Chestnut Street (Note: The address is listed incorrectly by some sources as "970 Chestnut Drive".)
- Town or city: Deerfield, Illinois
- Country: United States
- Coordinates: 42°10′15.0″N 87°51′05.3″W

The pie house, sometimes referred to as the Deerfield pie house or the Deerfield skinny house, is a two-story house located in Deerfield, Illinois, United States. It is located at 970 Chestnut Street, and is near the Deerfield Metra station. The beige-sided house was built to fit a narrow lot and has attracted attention due to its unusual shape. The house is not rectangular, but rather trapezoidal, and attained its primary nickname due to its resemblance to the shape of a slice of pie.

The house has gained media attention after being featured in a viral video on the social media platform TikTok in August 2020. Since then, it has been featured on The Tonight Show Starring Jimmy Fallon and has been covered by the Chicago Tribune, both of which have further increased its attention.

== Description ==
The home was built in 2003 on a small, irregularly shaped lot at 970 Chestnut Street in the Chicago suburb of Deerfield. The house is trapezoidal in shape, rather than the traditional rectangular shape, which has inspired its nickname, the "pie house", due to its apparent resemblance to a slice of pie. The triangular lot it sits on measures only 3,876 square feet (360.1 m^{2}), which contributes to the house's unusual shape. Despite outcry from neighbors, the village of Deerfield was not able to force any changes to be made to the design of the house as it met all building codes and was not legally required to be changed in any way. The house is two stories tall, and has a finished basement. It has more than 1,600 square feet (150 m^{2}) of floor space, and contains two bedrooms, two full bathrooms, and an additional half bathroom. The ground level of the home follows an open concept plan.

The narrowest side of the house measures 3 feet (0.91 m) wide, with the widest side of the house reaching a width of 18 feet (5.5 m). An outdoor patio borders the wider end of the house.

== Purchases ==
The home sold on August 6, 2020, with a list price of US$269,000 and an eventual purchase price of $260,000. It was listed for rental on Airbnb shortly afterwards, in October 2020. The house was put up for sale again in May 2021 for $300,000; it sold for $295,000 later that same month.

== Media attention ==
At the time the house was up for sale in August 2020, TikTok user @eli.korns_ recorded and posted a video of himself examining the house's exterior and showing amazement at its unusual dimensions. This video ended up going viral, receiving over one million views; attracting significant media attention to the house. Since then, the house has been featured on The Tonight Show Starring Jimmy Fallon and has been covered by numerous media outlets, including the Chicago Tribune.

== See also ==
- Casa Scaccabarozzi, house with a similar shape and name
- Any of various spite houses, some of which are comically narrow, and also earn neighbors' disapproval
