= Smallest house in Amsterdam =

House in Amsterdam, Netherlands

Coordinates: 52.3711°N 4.8978°E

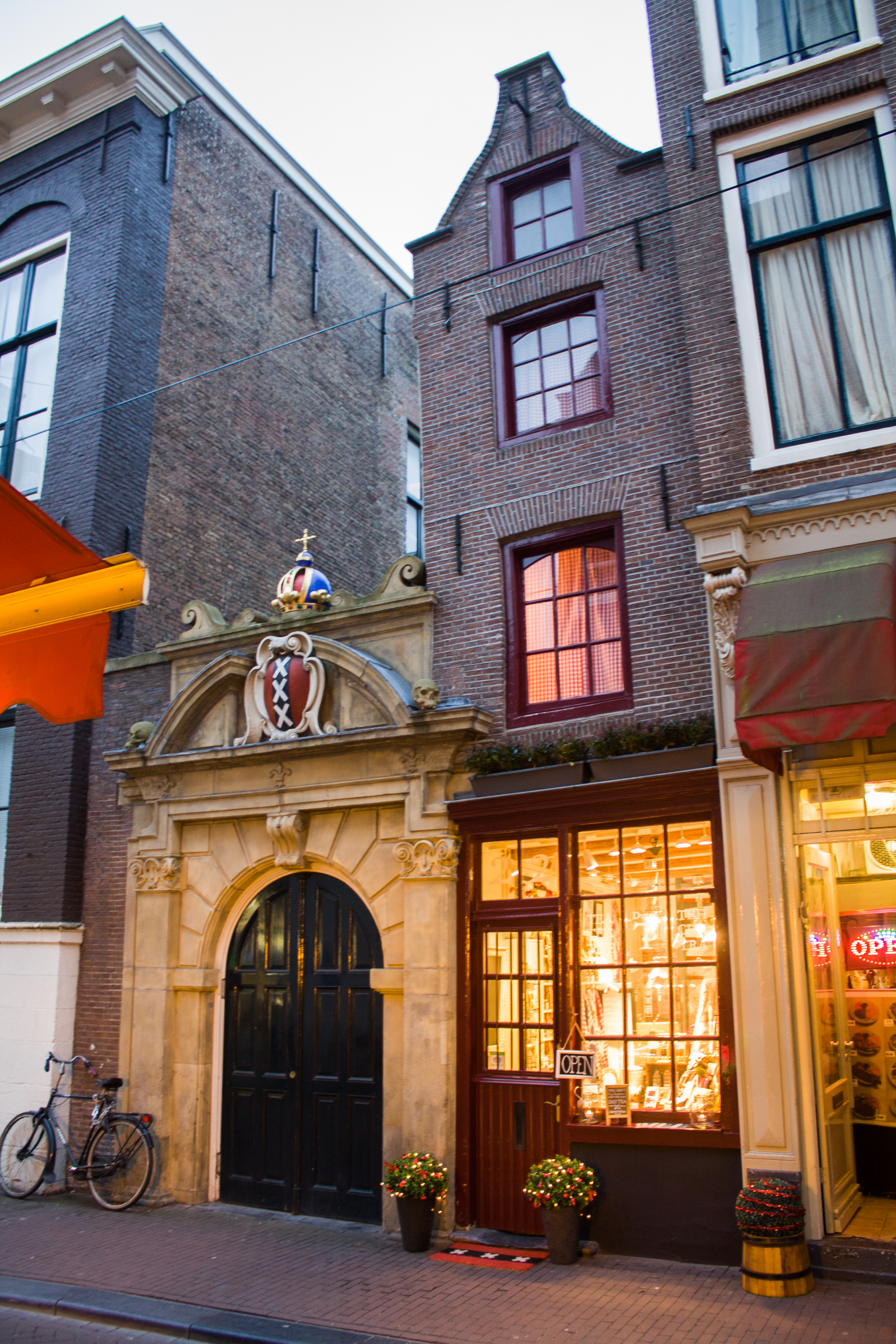
Front view of the smallest house in Amsterdam (2014)

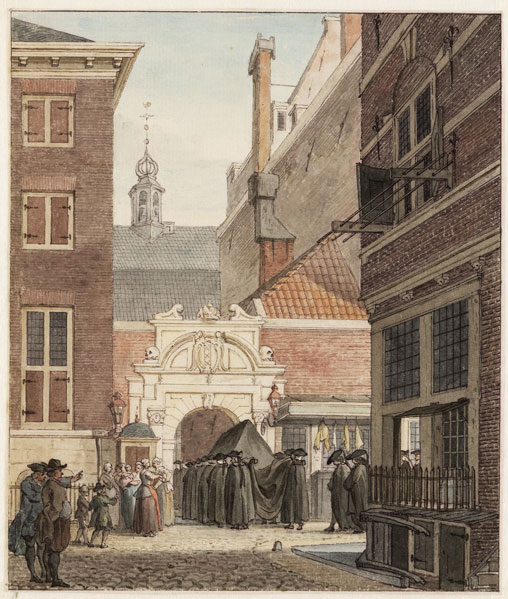
The gate with a funeral procession, depicted by Reinier Vinkeles in 1768. To the right of the gate the house is already standing, but it has only one floor

The smallest house in Amsterdam is located at Oude Hoogstraat 22 in the old city center of Amsterdam, next to the Oost-Indisch Huis and the gate to the Walloon Church. The house, by some called the "Smallest house of Europe", is 2.02 meters (6 feet 8 inches) wide and 5 meters (16 feet 5 inches) deep. With its distinctive spout gable, this house represents a miniature version of a typical Amsterdam canal house.

The smallest house in Amsterdam is registered as a national heritage site (rijksmonument).

== History ==
The smallest house in Amsterdam is located on the edge of the former site of the Sint-Paulusbroederklooster monastery. In 1550, a portion of this property was sold to the City of Amsterdam who built the Bushuis here. Later, in 1603, the Amsterdam chamber of the Dutch East India Company took possession of a part of the Bushuis and used it as a warehouse. In 1604, adjacent to the Bushuis, construction began of the East India House, which was completed in 1606.

Right next to the house is one of the most famous gates of Amsterdam: the Gateway to the Walloon Church. This gate, built in 1616, is the work of architect Hendrik de Keyser (1565–1621) and served as a passageway for funeral services.

The Oude Hoogstraat has always been a shopping street. On the current location of number 20 and 22 there was a property called 'King David'. This building was demolished in 1733 to make way for a new building site: the current building at number 20. The city purchased the remaining piece of land of about 10 square meters (110 square feet). On this land the smallest house in Amsterdam was built: the current number 22.

In 1738 the small house was first mentioned in the city Archives. For the first time, 'The City' paid taxes for the location where the house stands. In 1742, watchmaker Jan Tenking rented the house for 150 guilders per year.

Although nowadays the small house has two upper floors and an attic, in the early years the house only consisted of a ground floor. Between 1768 and 1787, the current levels and attic were built.

== See also ==
- Smallest House in Great Britain
